= 1879 in rail transport =

This article lists events related to rail transport that occurred in 1879.

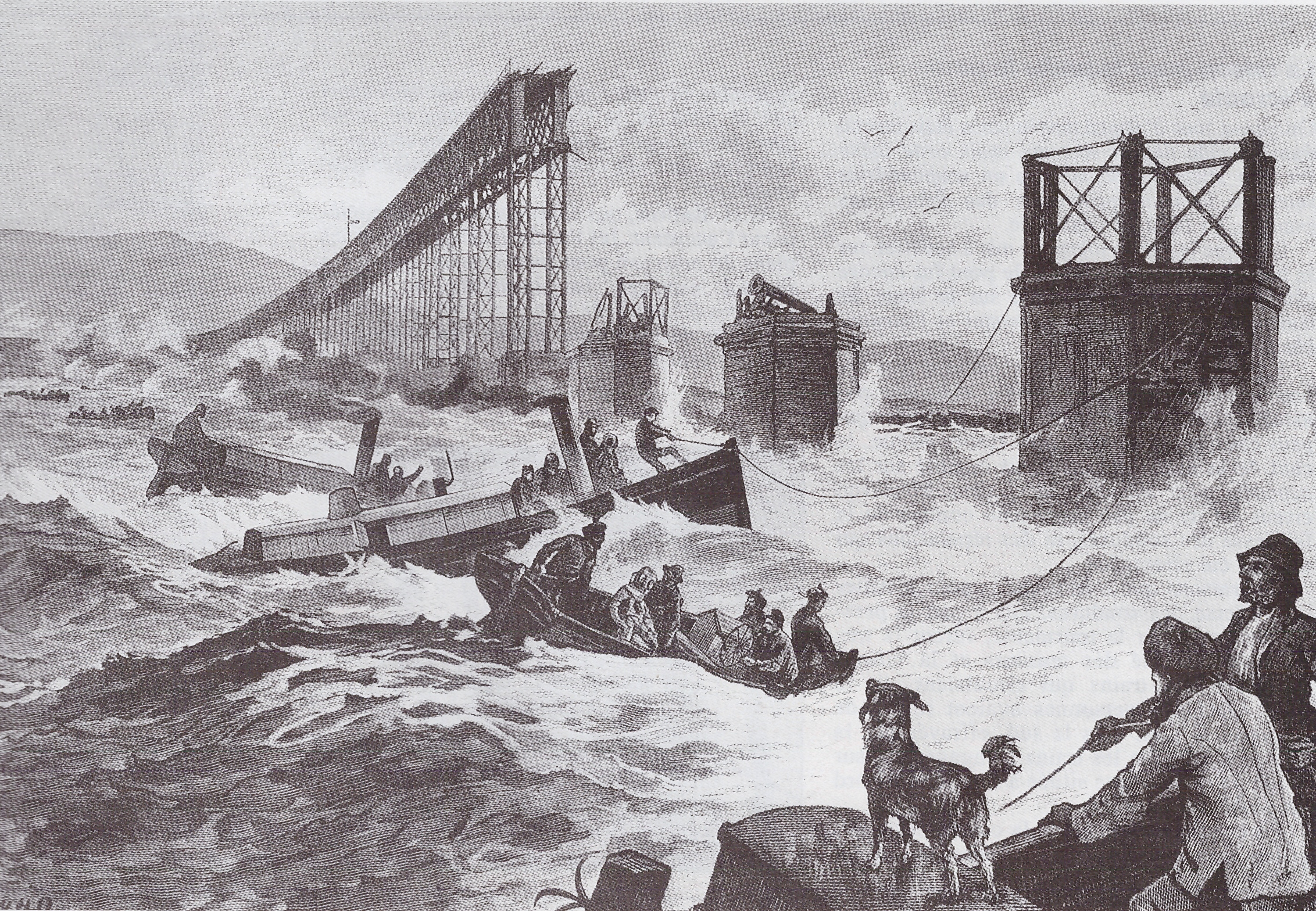
The Tay Bridge disaster, 1879. As of 2024, it remains the fifth-deadliest railway accident in the history of the United Kingdom, as well as the second deadliest rail accident in Scottish history.

== Events ==
=== January events ===
- January 28 – Construction of the Waimea Plains Railway, the first railway constructed under the District Railways Act of 1878, reaches Inverrcagill, New Zealand.

=== February events ===
- February 10 – The Pittsburgh and Lake Erie Railway begins freight operations.

=== May events ===
- May – James J. Hill forms the St. Paul, Minneapolis and Manitoba Railway from the assets of the bankrupt St. Paul and Pacific.
- May 17 – The Texas and St. Louis Railway, a predecessor of St. Louis Southwestern Railway, is organized as a way to ship cotton south to Texas.
- May 31 – The first electric railway opens at the Berlin Trades Exposition.

=== July events ===
- July 4 – The Atchison, Topeka and Santa Fe Railroad, building southwestward from Kansas, reaches Las Vegas, New Mexico.
- July 17 – Freycinet Plan enacted in France to extend rail and other transportation systems.
- July 31 – The Caledonian Railway opens the original Glasgow Central station in Scotland.

=== November events ===
- November 1 – The first British dining car service leaves Leeds for London King's Cross. This is provided by the Pullman car Princess of Wales which accommodates just 10 first-class passengers.
- November 20 – Narrow gauge Sandy River Railroad completed to Phillips, Maine.
- November 22 – The North Pennsylvania Railroad begins operating the Philadelphia, Newtown and New York Railroad, a subsidiary of Pennsylvania Railroad.
- November 25 – The Waldenburgerbahn is founded as a separate company and takes over the concession for the railway from Liestal to Waldenburg, Switzerland.

=== December events ===
- December 1 – Solano, the largest rail ferryboat ever constructed, is put into service in California.
- December 28 – Tay Bridge disaster: The North British Railway's Tay Bridge across the Firth of Tay in Scotland collapses in a violent storm while a passenger train is crossing it. 75 lives are lost. William Topaz McGonagall produces his epic poem The Tay Bridge Disaster to commemorate the event.

=== Unknown date events ===
- Southern Pacific Railroad engineers experiment with the first oil-fired steam locomotives.
- San Francisco and North Pacific Railroad constructs the Puerto Suello Hill Tunnel in Marin County, California.

== Births ==
=== March births ===
- March 6 – Patrick H. Joyce, president Chicago Great Western Railway 1931–1946 (d. 1946).

=== April births ===
- April 24 – Oris Paxton Van Sweringen, American financier who, with his brother Mantis, controls the Nickel Plate Road and other eastern railroads (d. 1936).

=== August births ===
- August 20 – Ralph Budd, president of the Great Northern Railway 1919–1932 and Chicago, Burlington and Quincy Railroad 1932–1949 (d. 1962).

=== October births ===
- October 18 – Charles Eugene Denney, president of Erie Railroad 1929–1939 and Northern Pacific Railway 1939–1950 (d. 1965).
