= 1889 in rail transport =

This article lists events related to rail transport that occurred in 1889.

== Events ==
=== January events ===
- January 16 – The Mito Line between Mito and Oyama, Japan, begins passenger train operations.
- January 28 – The last passenger car of a Chicago and North Western Railroad train derails and overturns and is then dragged over tree stumps near Elmwood, Michigan; Michigan's Lieutenant Governor and an acquaintance are killed in the accident.

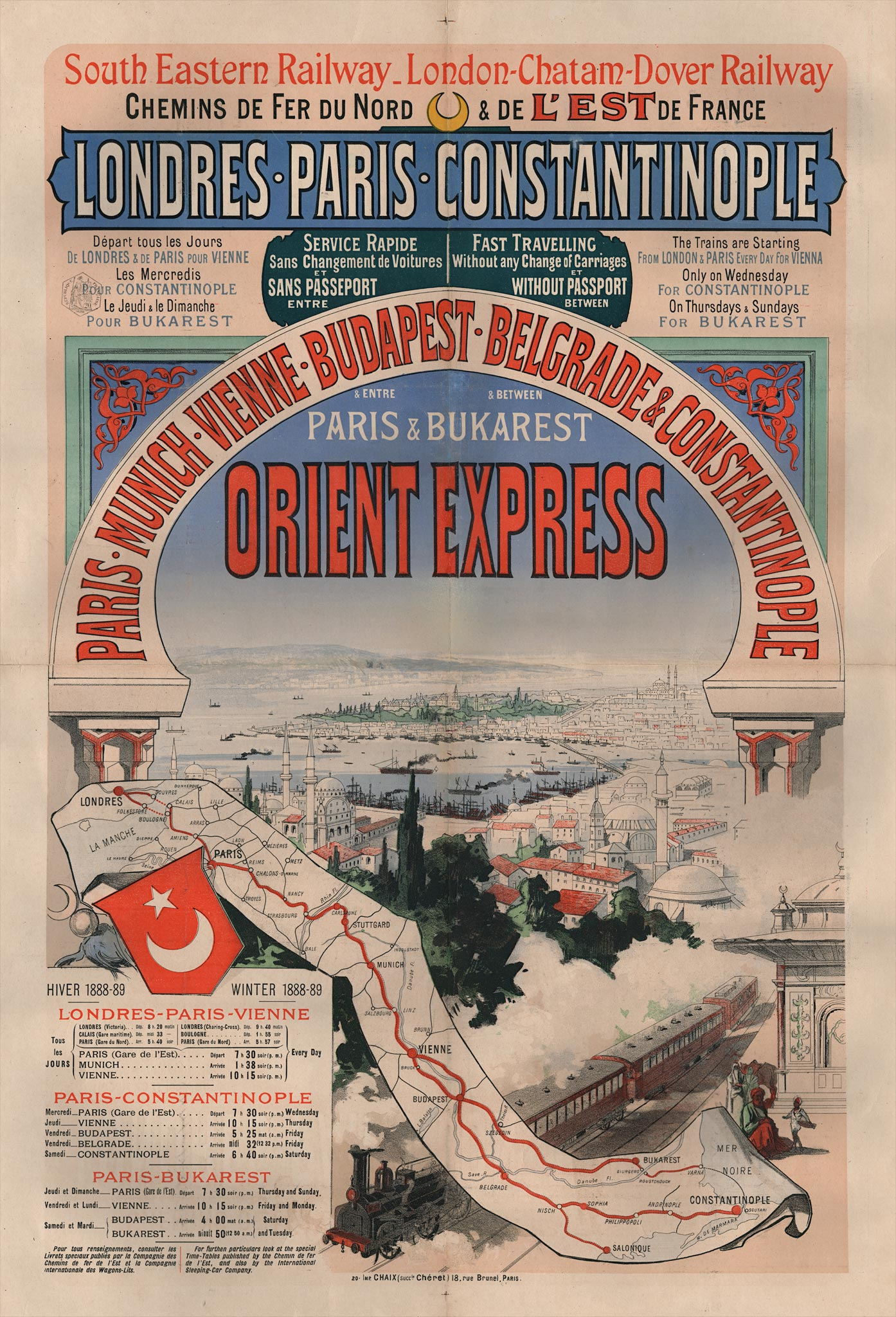
1889 advertising for Orient Express

=== March events ===
- March 25 – Inauguration of Lansdowne Bridge over Indus River completes the Indus Valley State Railway through route between Karachi and Lahore in British India.

=== May events ===
- May 1 – Opening of Hawkesbury River Railway Bridge north of Sydney, Australia.

=== June events ===
- June 1 – The first direct Orient Express is operated from Paris to Constantinople.
- June 12 – The Armagh rail disaster occurs near Armagh, Ireland: runaway carriages collide with an oncoming train, killing 80, and spurring the Parliament of the United Kingdom to pass the Regulation of Railways Act 1889, mandating improved brake and signal systems.
- June 30 – The Cleveland, Cincinnati, Chicago and St. Louis Railroad (the Big Four Railroad) is formed through the merger of the Cleveland, Columbus, Cincinnati and Indianapolis Railway Company, the Cincinnati, Indianapolis, St. Louis and Chicago Railway Company and the Indianapolis and St. Louis Railway Company.

=== July events ===
- July 1
  - The railway between Tokyo and Kobe, Japan (now known as the Tōkaidō Main Line) is completed.
  - A first section of Cumana Railway Line, Naples to Patamia Spa route officially completed, and regular operation service to start in Campania Region, Italy.
- July 9 – The Housatonic Railroad leases the New Haven and Derby Railroad.
- July 17 – The Denver, South Park and Pacific Railroad, in Colorado, is sold from receivership to the Denver, Leadville and Gunnison Railway.

=== August events ===
- August 3 – Opening of Hawarden Bridge, Wales.
- August 20 – First section of Steyr Valley Railway in Upper Austria opened.

=== September events ===
- September 18 – The Minneapolis and St. Cloud Railroad is reorganized as the Great Northern Railway.
- September 30 – Official opening of Palmerston to Pine Creek railway, first section of North Australia Railway, from Darwin to Birdum, Northern Territory.

=== October events ===
- October 15 – Amsterdam's Centraal Station, designed by P. J. H. Cuypers and Al Van Gendt, opens.

=== November events ===
- November 7 – Atchison, Topeka and Santa Fe Railway consolidates several of its subsidiary railroads in California into the Southern California Railway.

=== December events ===
- December 28 – The first interurban tram-train to emerge in the United States is the Newark and Granville Street Railway in Ohio.

=== Unknown date events ===
- Darjeeling Himalayan Railway takes delivery of first four Class B locomotives from Sharp, Stewart and Company of Glasgow: the design will remain in service into the 21st century.
- Riga–Pskov railway line connected with the Saint Petersburg–Warsaw Railway in Governorate of Livonia, Russian Empire is opened for traffic.
- First section of Luanda Railway opens in Portuguese Angola.
- State Belt Railroad begins operations in San Francisco.

== Births ==
=== Unknown date births ===
- Fred Gurley, president of Atchison, Topeka and Santa Fe Railway 1944–1957 (b. 1889, d. 1976).

== Deaths ==
=== October deaths ===
- October 15 – Sir Daniel Gooch, Chief mechanical engineer of the Great Western Railway 1837–1864 (b. 1816).

=== November deaths ===
- November 13 – Samuel Morton Peto, English railway contractor (b. 1809).
- November 24 – George H. Pendleton, president of Kentucky Central Railroad 1869-1879, dies (b. 1825).

=== December deaths ===
- December 13 – Franklin B. Gowen, president of the Philadelphia and Reading Railroad 1866–1883 (b. 1836).
- December 20 – William Stroudley, locomotive and carriage superintendent for Highland Railway 1865–1870; locomotive superintendent at London, Brighton and South Coast Railway's Brighton Works 1870–1889, dies (b. 1833).
