= 1896 in rail transport =

This article lists events related to rail transport that occurred in 1896.

== Events ==
=== January events ===
- January 23 – Construction begins on the Northwestern Elevated Railroad of the Chicago "L" with the first structure erected at the intersection of Fullerton and Sheffield Avenues.

=== February events ===
- February 14 – Northern Pacific Railway opens its Union Station in Portland, Oregon.
- February 19 – Braamfontein Explosion: A train carrying 56 tons of dynamite explodes at Braamfontein, Johannesburg, killing more than 78 people.
- February 24 – Erie Railroad purchases the New York, Pennsylvania & Ohio Railroad.

=== March events ===
- March 20 – The Grand Trunk Railway purchases the Central Vermont Railway and begins operating it as a wholly owned subsidiary.

=== April events ===
- April 6 – The Snowdon Mountain Railway in North Wales, the only Abt rack system line in the British Isles, commences public operation; however, a derailment leading to one fatality causes services to be suspended for a year.
- April 15 – Passenger rail service of the Henry Flagler Florida East Coast Railway arrives at its new terminus in Miami from West Palm Beach at the persuasion of Julia Tuttle; this quickly leads to incorporation of the city of Miami months later and extensive development of the Greater Miami, South Florida and the Keys.

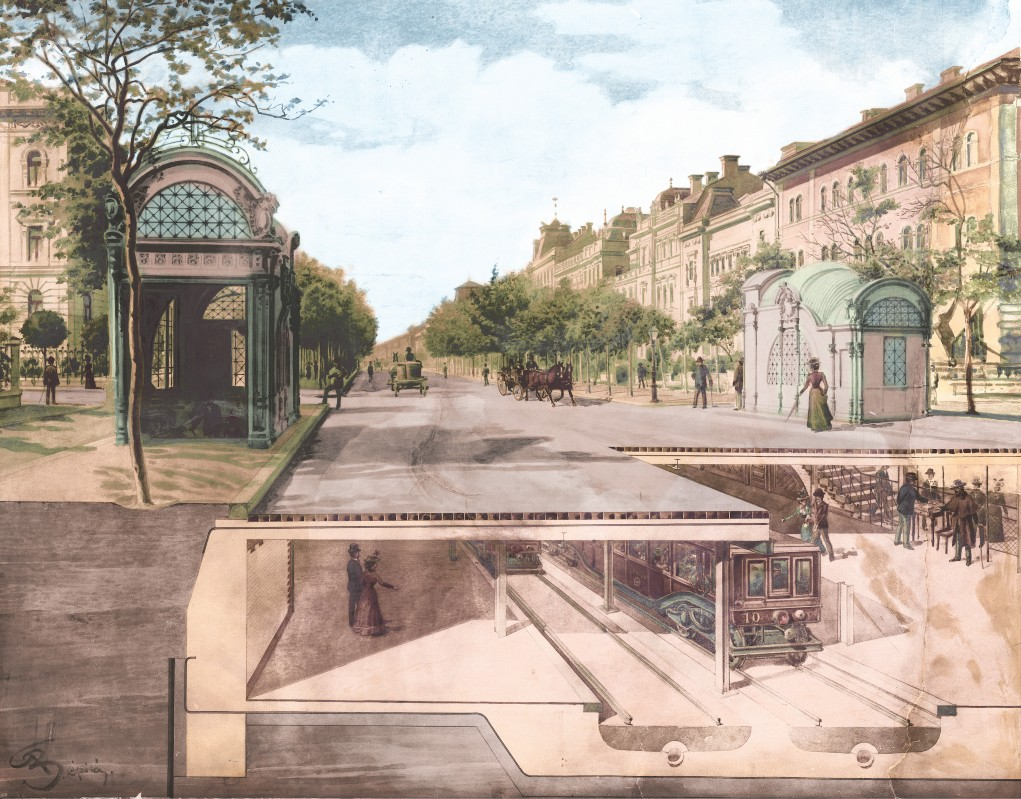
Budapest Metro

=== May events ===
- May 2 – Budapest Metro Line 1 (Hungary), the world's second, is opened by Emperor Franz Joseph I of Austria.
- May 9 – First Nord Express, Paris, France/Oostend, Belgium, to Saint Petersburg, Russia.
- May 13 – The Pretoria–Pietersburg Railway, a predecessor of the Central South African Railways, is incorporated in London.
- May 30 – Construction of the Uganda Railway starts at Mombasa.

=== June events ===
- June 29 – The St. Louis and San Francisco Railroad Company (predecessor of the St. Louis–San Francisco Railway) is incorporated.

=== July events ===
- July 23 – Delivery of world's first commercially-built oil-engined locomotive, from Richard Hornsby & Sons of Grantham, England to the Royal Arsenal, Woolwich, London (18 in (460 mm) gauge).
- July 30 – Atlantic City rail crash: Shortly after 6:30 PM, at a crossing just west of Atlantic City, New Jersey, two trains collide, crushing five loaded passenger coaches, killing 50 and seriously injuring around 60.

=== August events ===
- August 14 – The Uganda Railway Act, 1896, is approved in the United Kingdom for construction of a railway in Africa from Mombasa to Lake Victoria.

=== September events ===
- September 15 – The Missouri–Kansas–Texas Railroad (the 'Katy') conveys 40,000 people to Crush, Texas to witness a staged train wreck as a publicity stunt arranged by its general passenger agent, William George Crush. Three spectators are accidentally killed.

=== October events ===
- October 5 – Norwegian Railway Museum established at Hamar.

=== December events ===
- December 14 – Glasgow Subway, the third oldest metro system in the world, begins operations in Glasgow, Scotland.
- December 25 – Japanese National Railways opens two lines out of Tabata: an extension of the Tsuchiura Line from Tsuchiura, and the Sumidagawa Line to Sumidagawa.
- December 30 – SS Pere Marquette, the first steel train ferry, makes its first voyage.

=== Unknown date events ===
- The Green Bay & Western Railroad is formed from the bankruptcy proceedings of the Green Bay, Winona and Saint Paul Railroad.
- The Loup Creek & Deepwater Railway (predecessor of the Deepwater Railway) is formed.
- Atlas Car & Manufacturing Company of Cleveland, Ohio, begins building steam locomotives.
- Beyer, Peacock & Company of Manchester, England, deliver the first five New South Wales T524 class 'Australian Consolidation' 2-8-0 type heavy goods locomotives to the New South Wales Government Railways, forerunners of the system's numerically largest class, finally totalling 280 representatives.
- Narrow gauge Ferrocarril de Tacubaya begins passenger service to Mexico City's Tacubaya amusement park.
- The first narrow gauge (750 mm) railway in Estonia connecting Valga with Pärnu is opened.

== Deaths ==
=== January deaths ===
- January 23 – Ferdinand Schichau, German mechanical engineer and founder of locomotive manufacturing company Schichau-Werke, dies (b. 1814).

=== June deaths ===
- June 4 – Austin Corbin, president of Long Island Rail Road (b. 1827).

=== October deaths ===
- October 21 – James Henry Greathead, English inventor of the tunnelling shield used for the London Underground (b. 1844).
