= 1890 in rail transport =

This article lists events related to rail transport that occurred in 1890.

== Events ==
=== January events ===
- January 28 – Pittsburgh & Lake Erie Railroad acquires a section of the McKeesport and Belle Vernon Railroad around Belle Vernon, Pennsylvania.

=== February events ===
- February 22 – Cleveland, Cincinnati, Chicago & St Louis Railway (the "Big Four Railroad") gains control of the Peoria & Eastern Railway in southern Illinois.

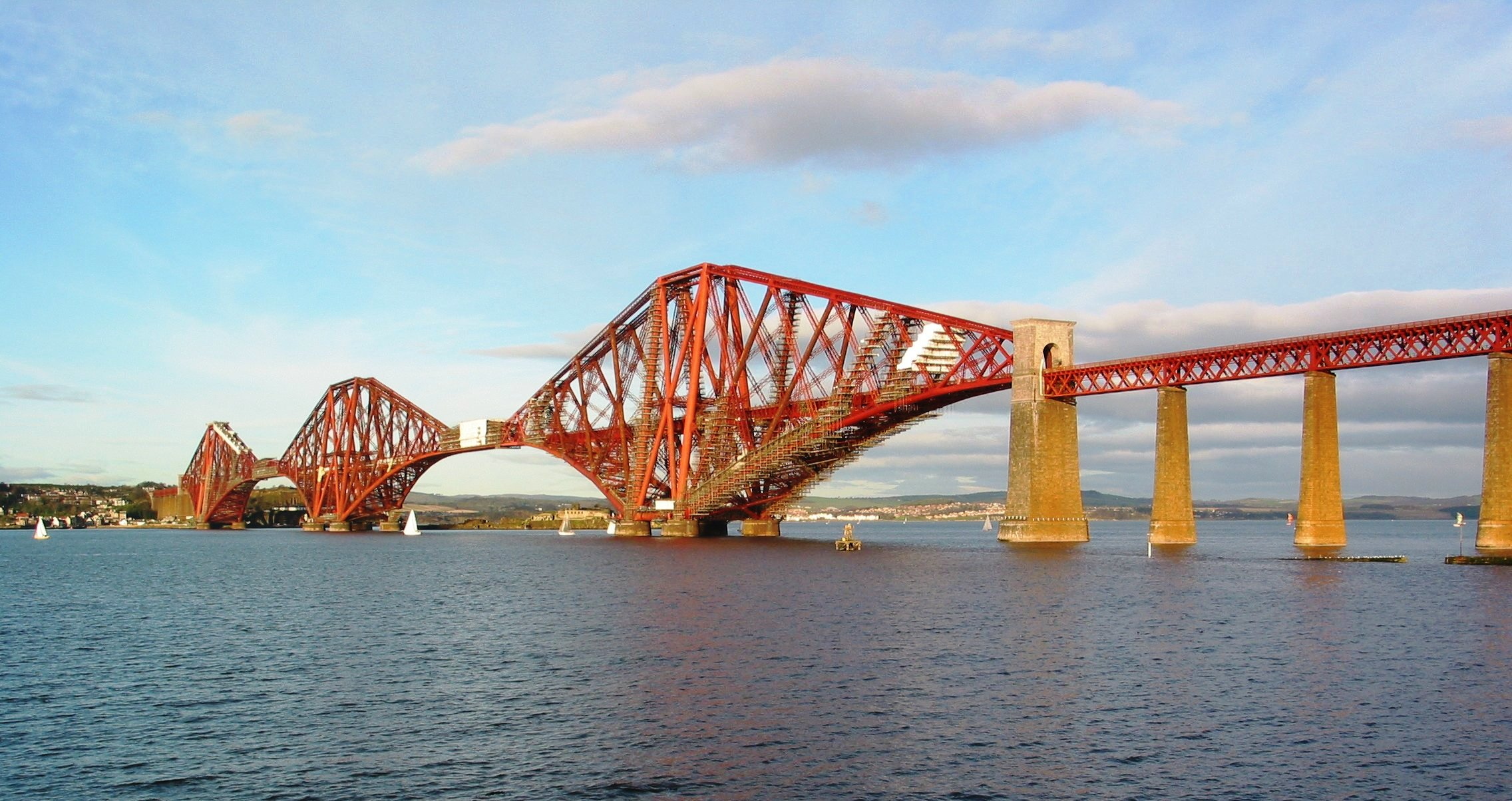
Forth Bridge

=== March events ===
- March – Émile Zola's psychological novel with a railway setting, La Bête Humaine, is published in book form.
- March 4 – The Forth Bridge across the Firth of Forth in Scotland is officially opened and its contractor, William Arrol, is knighted.

=== May events ===
- May 9 – Boston & Maine Railroad ends its lease of the Eastern Railroad of Massachusetts by purchasing it.
- May 20 – Wutach Valley Railway opened to provide a strategic route inside Germany without crossing the Swiss border.

=== July events ===
- July 23 – Narrow gauge Kennebec Central Railroad opens to Togus, Maine.

=== August events ===
- August 18 – The Kansas City Suburban Belt Railroad, a predecessor of Kansas City Southern Railway, begins operations between Kansas City and Argentine.
- August 19 – Pennsylvania Railroad subsidiary Ohio Valley Railway reorganized as the Pittsburg, Ohio Valley and Cincinnati Railroad.
- August 19 – In Quincy, Massachusetts, a jack used to level rails was left on the tracks. A passenger train then collided with it causing a derailment. Twenty-four people were killed due to the impact of the collision and through scalding.

=== November events ===
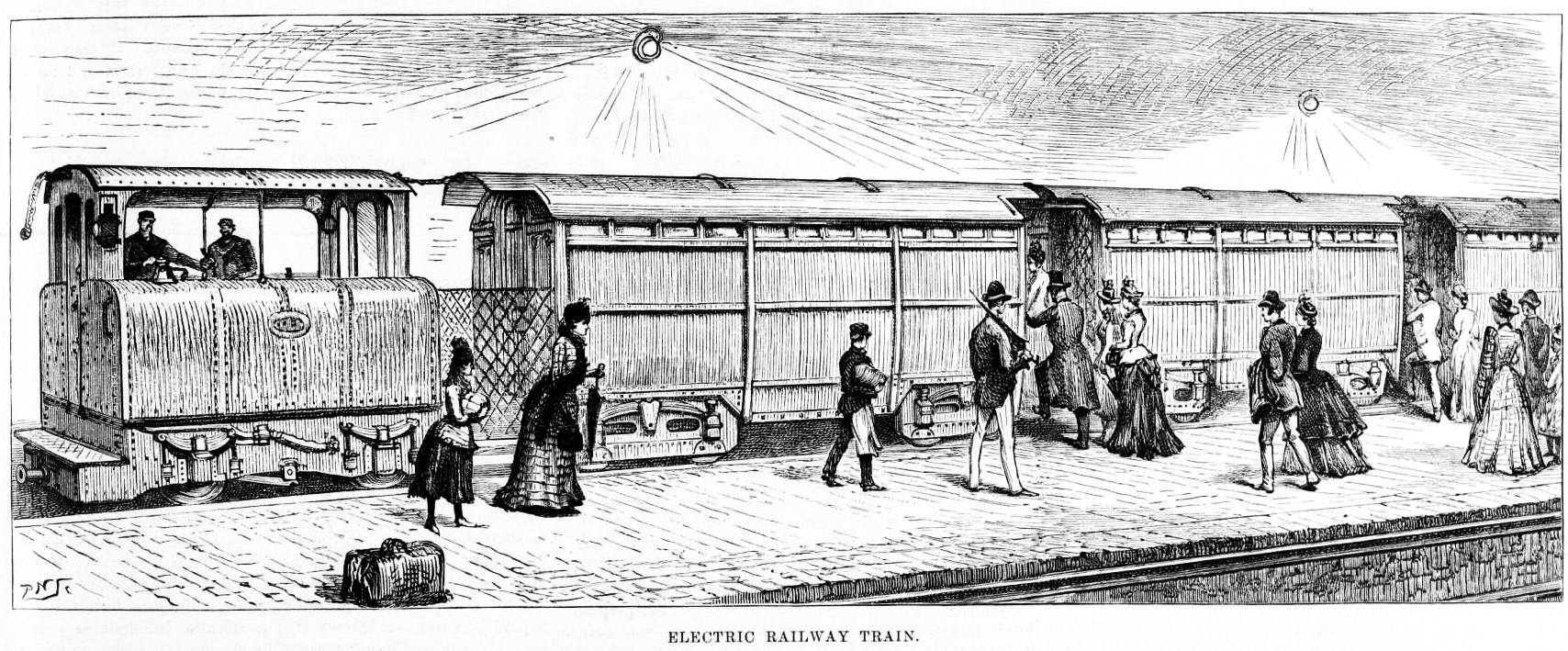
City & South London Railway train, from Illustrated London News, 1890

- November 4 – Official opening of the City & South London Railway, earliest constituent of the Northern line of the London Underground and the first real deep-level electrified "tube" railway in the world.
- November 9 – First section of metre gauge Chemin de fer du Vivarais in southern France opens, using Mallet locomotives.
- November 10 – Compagnie Internationale des Wagons-Lits begins to operate the Rome Express train from Calais Maritime station via Paris and the Fréjus Rail Tunnel.
- November 26 – The Mito Line in Japan operates its first freight trains.

=== Unknown date events ===
- First Class О 0-8-0 steam locomotive built for service in Russia. 9129 locomotives of this type will be built up to 1928, making it the country's most numerous.
- Klien-Lindner axle patented.
- Hugh J. Chisholm forms the Portland and Rumford Falls Railway to link Androscoggin River papermills to the Maine Central Railroad.
- Leland Stanford begins his term as Chairman of the Executive Committee for Southern Pacific.
- Charles Francis Adams, Jr. steps down from the presidency of the Union Pacific.

== Births ==
=== August births ===
- August 16 – CP Couch, president of Kansas City Southern Railway 1939–1941 (d. 1955).

== Deaths ==
=== July deaths ===
- July 15 – Silas Seymour, chief engineer and/or consulting engineer for several railroads in New York in the mid- to late 19th century (b. 1817).

=== September deaths ===
- September 30 – Frederick Billings, president of Northern Pacific Railway 1879–1881 (b. 1823).
