= 1921 in rail transport =

This article lists events related to rail transport that occurred in 1921.

== Events ==
=== January ===
- January 26 – Abermule train collision, Wales: faulty operation of single line train tablet leads to head-on collision killing 17 people.

=== April ===
- April 15 – Southern Pacific Railroad takes delivery of 4-6-2 number 2472 (now preserved) from Baldwin Locomotive Works.

=== July ===
- July 14 – In an effort to consolidate maintenance and simplify operations, Grand Trunk Railway and Canadian Northern Ontario Railway open a 0.35 miles (0.56 km) connection in Lyn, Ontario.
- July 24 – In the Russian SFSR, the propeller-driven Aerowagon derails at speed, killing 6.

=== August ===
- August 19 – Publication in the United Kingdom of the Railways Act 1921, which provides for the amalgamation of British railway companies into four large groups, "The Big Four", with effect from January 1, 1923.

=== September ===
- September 17 – The Dovre Line between Oslo and Trondheim in Norway is officially opened.

=== December ===
- December 5 – The Louisville and Nashville Railroad introduces the Pan-American passenger train between Cincinnati, Ohio and New Orleans, Louisiana.

=== Unknown date ===
- Spring – Founding of Railway & Locomotive Historical Society in the U.S.
- Standard Oil begins shipments of gasoline from Casper, Wyoming, by tank car on the Chicago, Burlington and Quincy Railroad to Baton Rouge, Louisiana; in Baton Rouge, the fuel is transloaded to ships for export. The city of Casper claims that it ships more oil by railroad than any other city in the world.

== Births ==
=== July births ===
- July 31 – James I. C. Boyd, British railway historian (died 2009).

== Deaths ==
=== February deaths ===
- February 9 – Lucius E. Johnson, president of the Norfolk and Western Railroad 1904–1921 (born 1846).

=== April deaths ===
- April 10 – Henry Kirke Porter, American steam locomotive builder (born 1840).

=== May deaths ===
- May 18 – Franklin Knight Lane, Interstate Commerce Commission commissioner 1905–1913, chairman of same in 1913 (b. 1864).

=== September deaths ===
- September 3 – Joseph A. Bennett, president of the Bridgton and Saco River Railroad (born 1852).

=== November deaths ===
- November 29 – George Stephen, first president of Canadian Pacific Railway Limited 1881–1888 (born 1829).

== See also ==
- List of rail accidents (1920–1929)
