= 1897 in rail transport =

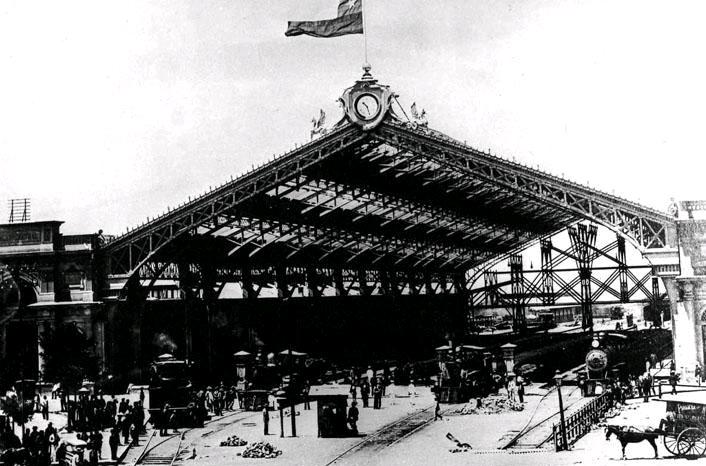
Estacion Central de Santiago de Chile, 1897

This article lists events related to rail transport that occurred in 1897.

== Events ==
=== March events ===
- March 24 – Construction begins on the Sierra Railway of California, now known as the Sierra Railroad, between Oakdale and Jamestown, California.

=== May events ===
- May 4 – The Rio Grande Junction Railway sells the Colorado Midland out of bankruptcy to private investors.

=== June events ===
June 11 – The Welshampton rail crash in England kills 12.

=== July events ===
- July – The Railway Magazine is first published, in London.
- July 1 – The Louisville, New Albany & Chicago Railroad is reorganized as the Chicago, Indianapolis and Louisville Railway Company (later to become the Monon Railroad).
- July 12 – The Kansas, Oklahoma and Gulf Railway, a predecessor of the St. Louis - San Francisco Railway, is incorporated in the Oklahoma Territory.
- July 22 – At the railroad's first stockholder meeting, the Toledo and Milwaukee Railroad. a predecessor of the Lake Shore and Michigan Southern Railway, officially changes its name to Detroit, Toledo and Milwaukee Railroad.

=== August events ===
- August 17 – W. B. Purvis is awarded a patent for an electric railroad switch.
- August 23 – Groundbreaking ceremonies are held for the construction of the Ottawa and New York Railway.
- August 27 – Whirlpool Rapids Bridge wholly replaces the Niagara Falls Suspension Bridge on the U.S.–Canadian border.
- August 28 – Construction begins on the Chinese Eastern and South Manchurian lines of the Trans-Siberian Railway.
- August 31 – Charles Sanger Mellen succeeds Edwin Winter as president of Northern Pacific Railway.

=== September events ===
- September 1 – The Tremont Street Subway tunnel in Boston, the oldest subway tunnel in North America, opens.

=== October events ===
- October 3 – The Loop Elevated (1.79 miles/2.88 km) in downtown Chicago is opened for service. Lake Street Elevated trains are routed around the Loop, Metropolitan West Side Elevated train began using the Loop on October 11, and South Side Elevated trains began using the Loop on October 18.
- October – Construction begins in Djibouti City on the Addis Ababa - Djibouti Railway.

=== November events ===
- November 2 – The Highland Railway's Kyle of Lochalsh Line is completed throughout to the west coast of Scotland.
- November 23 – Andrew J. Beard invents the "jerry coupler".

=== December events ===
- December 27 – The first train is operated on the Randsburg Railway between Kramer and Johannesburg, California.

=== Unknown date events ===
- Several smaller railroads in South Carolina are merged to form the Atlantic Coast Line Railroad Company of South Carolina, a predecessor of the Atlantic Coast Line Railroad.
- First successful class of 2-8-2 steam locomotives built by Baldwin Locomotive Works of Philadelphia for the 3 ft 6 in (1,067 mm) gauge Nippon Railway of Japan (hence the class name Mikado).
- The Ottawa, Arnprior & Parry Sound Railway begins full service between Ottawa, Ontario and Parry Sound, Ontario.
- Narrow gauge Ferrocarril Cazadero la Torre y Tepetongo begins passenger service to Nado, Estado de México.
- Narrow gauge (750 mm (2 ft 5 1/2 in) ) railway in Estonia is built to connect Viljandi with the Valga–Pärnu line in Mõisaküla. Later the line is extended from Viljandi to Paide and then to Reval (Tallinn) harbour.

== Births ==
=== February births ===
- February 14 – Robert R. Young, chairman of Chesapeake and Ohio Railway and New York Central (d. 1958).

=== November births ===
- November 16 – Harold W. Burtness, president of Chicago Great Western Railway 1946–1948, is born (d. 1978).

=== Unknown date births ===
- Wayne A. Johnston, president of Illinois Central Railroad 1945–1966 (d. 1967).

== Deaths ==
=== April deaths ===
- April 3 – Albert Fink, German American civil engineer and railroad manager (b. 1827).

=== May deaths ===
- May 20 – John Ramsbottom, superintendent of the Manchester and Birmingham Railway (b. 1814).

=== July deaths ===
- July 17 – Charles Frederick Crocker, son of Charles Crocker of California's Big Four railroaders, president of San Joaquin and Sierra Nevada Railroad, vice president of Southern Pacific Railroad, dies (b. 1854).

=== September deaths ===
- September 14 – Carl Abraham Pihl, Norwegian civil engineer and director of the Norwegian State Railways (NSB) 1865–1897 (b. 1825).

=== October deaths ===
- October 19 – George Pullman, American inventor and industrialist, founder of the Pullman Company (b. 1831).

=== December deaths ===
- December 1 – William Dudley Chipley, president of Baltimore and Ohio Railroad 1873–1876 (b. 1840).

=== Unknown date deaths ===
- Aretas Blood, second superintendent of American steam locomotive builder Manchester Locomotive Works (b. 1816).
