= 1895 in rail transport =

This article lists events related to rail transport that occurred in 1895.

== Events ==
=== February events ===
- February 1 – The Kyoto Electric Railway, Japan's first electric tramway, begins operation from the centre of Kyoto to Fushimi.

=== May events ===
- May 6 – The Metropolitan West Side Elevated Railroad is opened in Chicago as the first electrically operated rapid transit system in the U.S. between downtown Canal & Jackson Streets and Damen & Milwaukee Avenues including the first completed Scherzer rolling lift bridge. The road initially uses 55 wooden motor coaches built by the Barney and Smith Car Company of Dayton, Ohio and 100 wooden trailer coaches built by the Pullman Car Company from Chicago, Illinois. On May 25, it is completed to Logan Square. This route will eventually become the O'Hare branch of the Blue Line.

=== June events ===
- June 17 – The Garfield Park branch of the Metropolitan West Side Elevated Railroad in Chicago begins service between Marshfield Avenue junction and Cicero (48th) Avenue. This route will subsequently be replaced in 1958 by the high-speed Congress branch of today's Blue Line along the Eisenhower Expressway.
- June 27 – The Lynton and Barnstaple Railway in England is incorporated by an act of Parliament.
- June 28 – The New Haven and Hartford Railroad begins the first regular passenger service in the United States powered by electricity.

=== July events ===
- July–August – Second "Race to the North": Operators of the East and West Coast Main Lines in Britain accelerate their services between London and Aberdeen.
- July 8 – The Delagoa Bay Railway, in South Africa, opens.
- July 29 – Service begins on the Chicago "L" Humboldt Park branch.

=== August events ===
- August 4 – Baltimore and Ohio Railroad introduces electric locomotives, the first in commercial service in the United States, over 3.75 mi (6.04 km) of line near Camden, Baltimore, initially using an overhead electric slot system.
- August 20 – The Snaefell Mountain Railway opens in the Isle of Man. It is a 5 mi (8.0 km) 3 ft 6 in (1,067 mm) gauge line electrified using overhead wires at 550 v DC with bow collectors and uses a Fell centre rail for braking, rising to a 2,034 ft (620 m) summit.
- August 28 – The Douglas Park branch of the Metropolitan West Side Elevated Railroad in Chicago begins service between Marshfield Avenue junction and 18th Street. It will be subsequently extended southwest and reach suburban Cicero by 1907 and Berwyn in 1924. It will also become part of the Blue Line, and later, the Pink Line.

=== September events ===
- September 7 – The Jacksonville, St. Augustine and Indian River Railway Company changes its name to Florida East Coast Railway.
- September 26 – Anghel Saligny Bridge across the Danube inaugurated, at this time the longest metal bridge in continental Europe.

=== October events ===
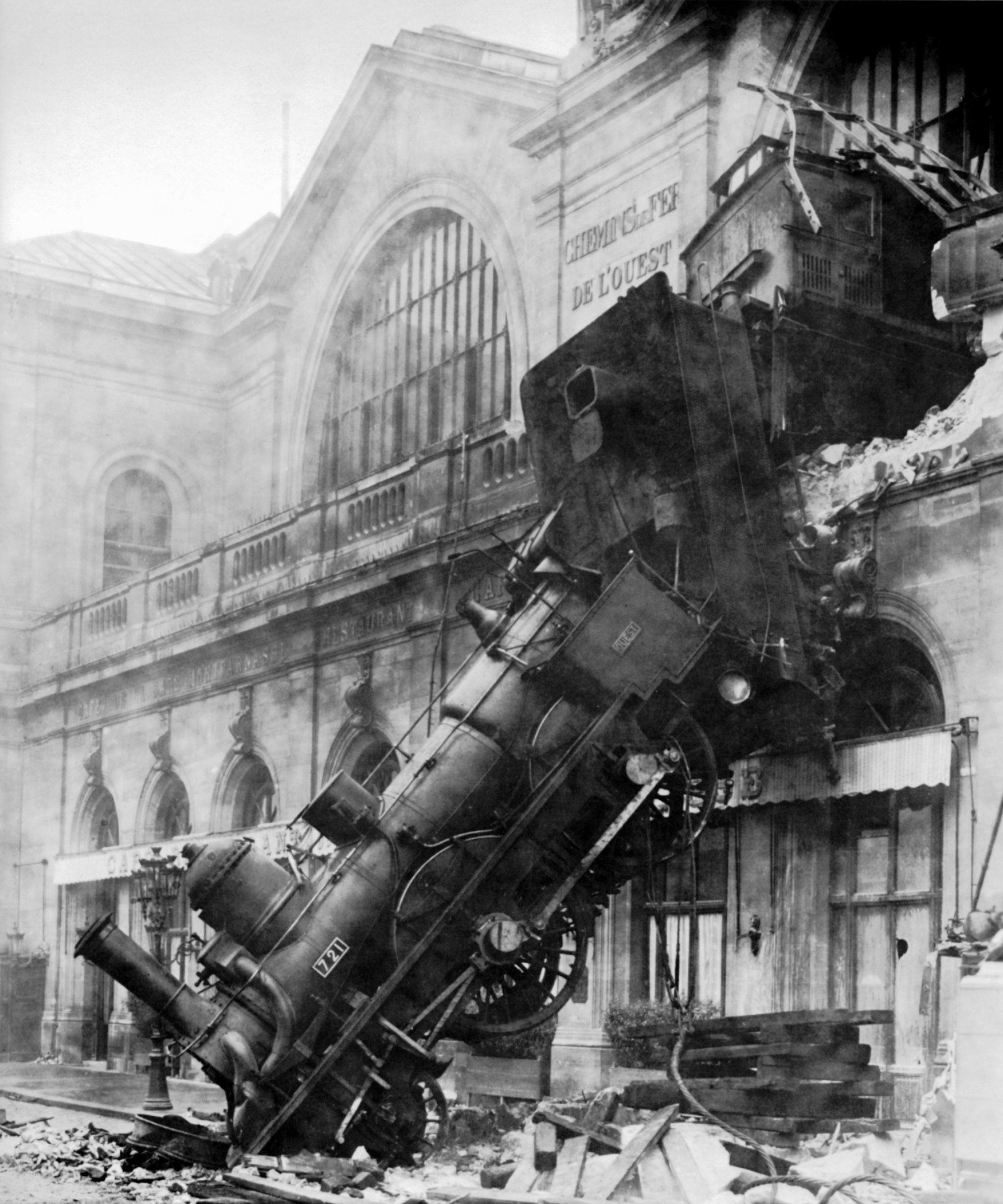
Going too far at Gare Montparnasse, Paris.

- October 10 – Opening of first transcontinental railway in South Africa linking Cape Town and Durban.
- October 22 – Montparnasse derailment: at the Gare Montparnasse, Paris, France, an express train overruns the buffer stop and crosses more than 30 metres (98 ft) of concourse before plummeting through a window.

=== November events ===
- November 4 – Nippon Railway begins operations on the Tsuchiura Line between Tsuchiura and Tomobe.
- November 4 – Narrow gauge Wiscasset and Quebec Railroad opens from Wiscasset, Maine to Albion.

=== December events ===
- December 15 – The railways of the Cape of Good Hope, Colony of Natal, the Orange Free State, the South African Republic and southern Mozambique are all linked at Union Junction near Alberton.

=== Unknown date events ===
- The Pasadena and Los Angeles Electric Railway, the first interurban service in the Los Angeles area, opens.
- The Pasadena and Pacific Railroad begins construction on an interurban line between Pasadena and Santa Monica, California.
- Turkmenbashi railway station opens in Krasnovodsk, Turkmenistan.

== Deaths ==
=== April deaths ===
- April 23 – Francis Thompson, English architect working chiefly on railways (b. 1808).

=== October deaths ===
- October 8 – William Mahone, American civil engineer and Confederate Army Major General who built the Norfolk and Petersburg Railroad, a predecessor of the Norfolk and Western (b. 1826).
