= 1908 in rail transport =

This article lists events related to rail transport that occurred in 1908.

== Events ==
=== January events ===
- January 28 – Florida's Railroad Commissioners adopt rule number 12 of the state's general operating rules for railroads within the state; the rule mandates that railroad companies are required to immediately report by telegram any train wreck within the state beyond a simple derailment that involves injury or death to any person and follow up the telegram within five days with a full written report.

=== February events ===
- February 25 – The Hudson and Manhattan Railroad starts revenue service between Hoboken, New Jersey and 19th Street, Manhattan.

=== March events ===
- March 25 – The Washington, Baltimore and Annapolis Electric Railway extends passenger service from its existing Washington-Annapolis route to Baltimore, Maryland.
- March 30 – Spokane, Portland and Seattle Railway purchases the Columbia Railway and Navigation Company.

=== April events ===
- April 8 – The Chicago "L" Stock Yards branch serving the Union Stock Yards is opened.
- April 20 – A rear-end collision in Melbourne, Australia, called the Sunshine train disaster, kills 44 and injures around 400.

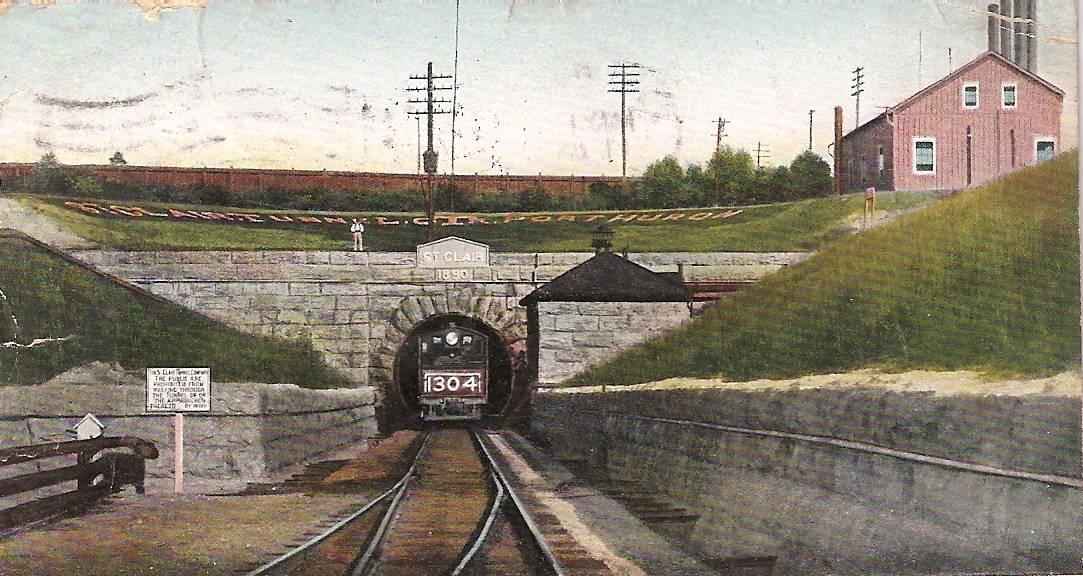
Electric traction in St. Clair Tunnel

=== May events ===
- May 17 – Trains operating through the St. Clair Tunnel under the St. Clair River between Sarnia, Ontario, and Port Huron, Michigan, begin using electric locomotives instead of steam locomotives.

=== June events ===
- June 23 – The Denver & Interurban begins operations using some electrified lines of the Union Pacific, Denver & Gulf. The UPD&G and the D&I are both owned by the Colorado and Southern Railway.
- June 30 – Last day steam trains can operate south of the Harlem River in New York City.
- June – The distinctive 'bar and circle' design of station nameboards are introduced on the London Underground.

=== July events ===
- July 1
  - Public inauguration of Midland Railway Lancaster–Morecambe–Heysham electrification system (6.6 kV A.C. at 25 Hz), the first overhead wire scheme on a passenger railway in England.
  - Chicago South Shore and South Bend Railroad begins service between Michigan City and South Bend, Indiana.
- July 8 – Construction begins on the Belt Line Railway of Toronto in Hull, Ontario.
- July 9 – The Prussian state railways South Bridge (Cologne) collapses during construction.
- July 10 – Thamshavnbanen, the first electrified railway in Norway, opens.
- July 14 – Shinpei Goto steps down as president of the South Manchuria Railway.

=== August events ===
- August 7 – New Zealand Railways runs first through train in the North Island main trunk line between Wellington and Auckland (680 km (420 mi)).

=== September events ===
- September 1 – Hejaz Railway opens from Damascus, Syria, to Medina, Saudi Arabia, on the Arabian Peninsula.
- September 23 – Yokohama Railway Line, Higashi-Kanagawa of Yokohama to Hachioji route officially completed in Japan (as predecessor of Yokohama Line).

=== October events ===
- October 1 - The Hofpleinlijn, the first electrified railway in the Netherlands, opens between Rotterdam Hofplein and Scheveningen, of which the part until The Hague exists today as part of Rotterdam Metro line E.

=== November events ===
- November 1 – The London, Brighton and South Coast Railway introduces the Southern Belle passenger train between London and Brighton.
- November – Following experiments, the Great Western Railway of England begins to introduce Automatic Train Control on its main lines.

=== December events ===
- December 18 – Great Northern Railway (U.S.) completes construction of the line between Great Falls and Billings, Montana.
- December 19 – Korekimi Nakamura begins his term as the second president of South Manchuria Railway.

=== Unknown date events ===
- The Soo Line acquires a majority interest in the Wisconsin Central Railway.
- Prussian P 8 Class 4-6-0 steam locomotives introduced; around 3,700 are eventually built to this design.

== Births ==
=== March births ===
- March 15 – Bernard Holden, president of Bluebell Railway in England (d. 2012).

=== September births ===
- September 18 – John Francis Nash, vice president of operations for New York Central and president of the Pittsburgh and Lake Erie Railroad and Lehigh Valley Railroad (died 2004).

== Deaths ==
=== January deaths ===
- January 14 – Matthias N. Forney, American steam locomotive manufacturer (born 1835).

=== June deaths ===
- June 3 – Robert Gillespie Reid, builder of many Canadian railway bridges as well as the Newfoundland Railway (died 1842).
