= 1917 in rail transport =

This article lists events related to rail transport that occurred in 1917.

== Events ==
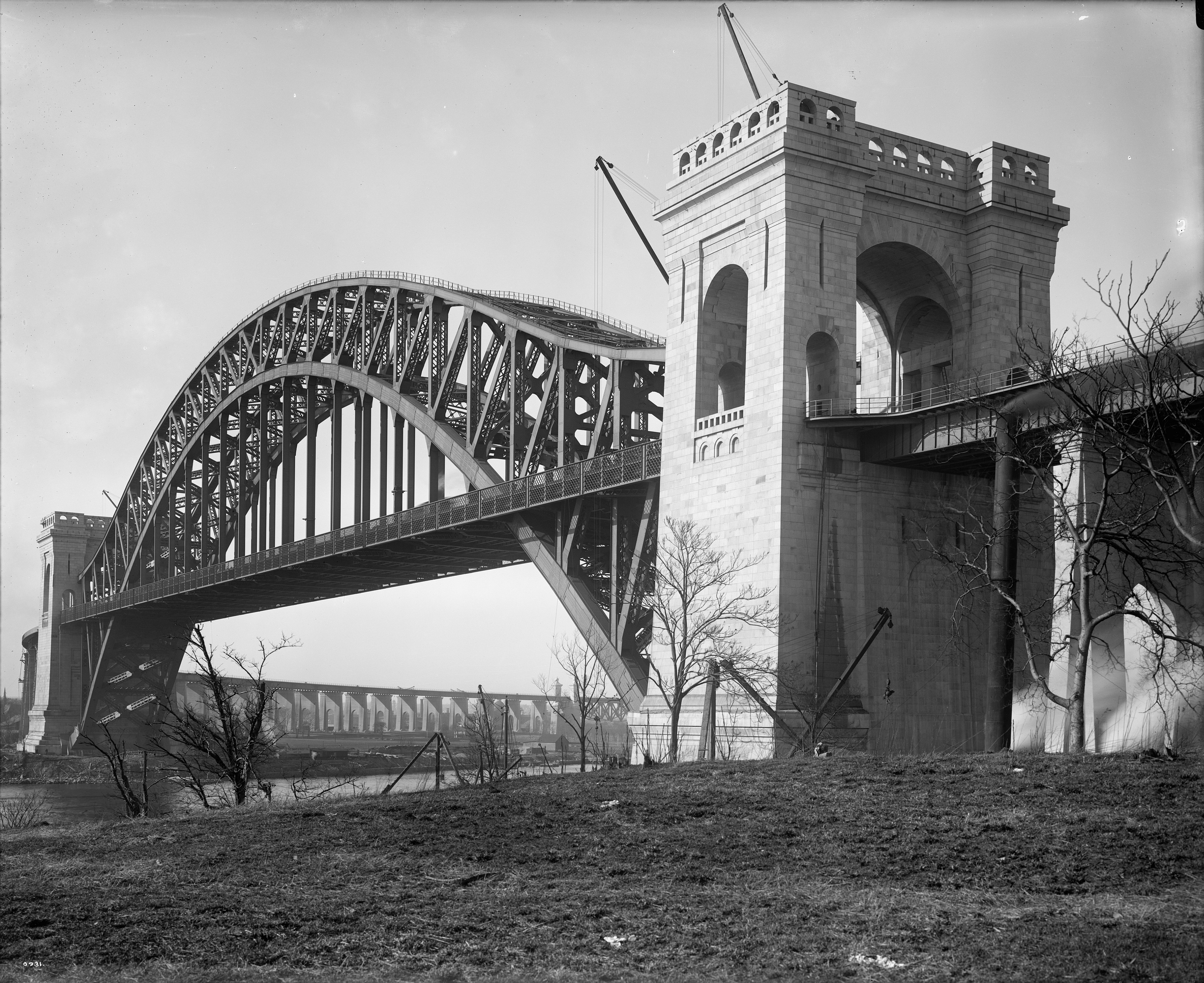
Hell Gate Bridge when new

=== January events ===
- January 3 - Ratho rail crash in Scotland: North British Railway H class locomotive 874 Dunedin, in charge of an Edinburgh to Glasgow express train, collides with a light engine at Queensferry Junction near Ratho Station, leaving 12 people dead and 46 seriously injured; the cause is found to be inadequate signalling procedures.

=== February events ===
- February 27 - The Milwaukee Road completes the electrification of its 440 miles (710 km) line from Harlowton, Montana, to Avery, Idaho.

=== March events ===
- March 9 - Official opening of the Hell Gate Bridge in New York City.
- March 12 - The Pere Marquette Railroad is reincorporated as the Pere Marquette Railway.
- March 19 - The United States Supreme Court upholds the eight-hour workday for railroads.

=== April events ===
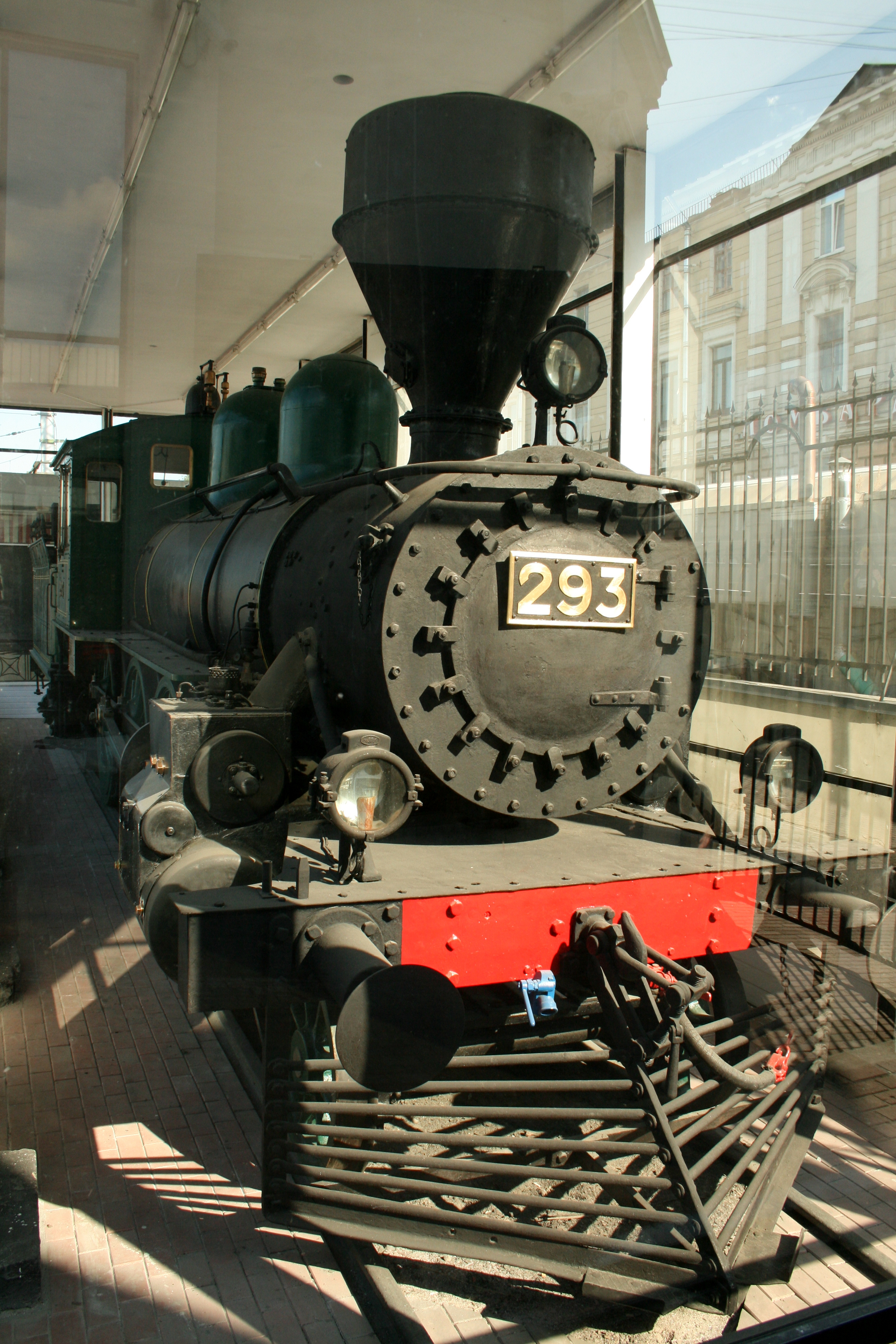
Locomotive of Lenin’s train, on which he arrived at Finland Station, Petrograd in April 1917.

- April 3–16 (NS) - Vladimir Lenin journeys from Switzerland across Germany by so-called "sealed train", eventually arriving to a tumultuous reception at Finland Station in Petrograd to play a leading role in the Russian Revolution.
- April 21 - Colorado Midland declares bankruptcy for the second and final time.

=== May events ===
- May 9 - Completion of the 784 km-long railway line linking the port of Djibouti in French Somaliland to Addis Ababa, the capital of Ethiopia.

=== July events ===
- July 31
  - The Chesapeake & Ohio Railway opens the Sciotoville Bridge across the Ohio River in the United States to rail traffic. It has a continuous truss across two 775-foot (236 m) spans, the world's longest until 1945.
  - Simbei Kunisawa succeeds Yujiro Nakamura as president of South Manchuria Railway.

=== September ===
- September 24 - The Bere Ferrers rail accident in England kills 10 New Zealand soldiers.

=== October events ===
- October – First North British Railway C Class steam locomotives are allocated from Scotland for loan to the British Royal Engineers' Railway Operating Division on the Western Front (World War I).
- October 22 – Opening of Trans-Australian Railway, 1051.7 miles (1692.6 km) of standard gauge between Port Augusta in South Australia and Kalgoorlie in Western Australia (heads of steel meet on 17 October). In crossing of the Nullarbor Plain the line runs for 309 miles (497 km) without a curve, the world’s longest railway straight.
- October 23 - The Canadian Railway War Board (predecessor of the Railway Association of Canada) meets for the first time at Windsor Station, Montreal.

=== November events ===
- November 1 – Takatoku station, now known as Shin-Takatoku Station on Tobu Railway's Kinugawa Line in Nikkō, Tochigi, Japan, is opened.

=== December events ===
- December 3 - The longest cantilever bridge in the world, Canadian National's Quebec Bridge across the St. Lawrence River near Quebec City, opens for rail traffic after nearly 20 years of planning and construction including two partial collapses.
- December 12 - Saint-Michel-de-Maurienne derailment, on the Culoz–Modane railway in the French Alps, a grossly overloaded troop train jumps the tracks near the entrance of the station at Saint-Michel-de-Maurienne, after running away down a steep gradient from the entrance to the Fréjus Rail Tunnel due to inadequate brake power. At least 543 are killed, hundreds more are injured by the official count; the actual count is assumed to be considerably higher. Until 1981 this was the worst train wreck in history.
- December 26 - United States President Woodrow Wilson uses the Federal Possession and Control Act to nationalize American railroads under the United States Railroad Administration during World War I.
- December 28 - The United States Railroad Administration officially takes control of American railroads.

=== Unknown date events ===
- The Tanana Valley Railroad in Fairbanks, Alaska (a predecessor of the Alaska Railroad) enters receivership.
- The Arcade and Attica Railroad is incorporated.
- Estación Constitución in Buenos Aires, Argentina, opens.
- The Hershey Electric Railway in Cuba opens.
- Russia's Railway Worker Day national holiday, established in 1886, is abolished under Bolshevik rule.

== Births ==
=== Unknown date births ===
- John Shedd Reed, president of Atchison, Topeka and Santa Fe Railway 1967-1986 (died 2008).

== Deaths ==
=== October deaths ===
- October 2 - William Sykes, English railway signalling engineer (born 1840).
