= 1918 in rail transport =

This article lists events related to rail transport that occurred in 1918.

== Events ==
=== January events ===
- January 19 - The Little Salkeld rail accident in England kills 7 people.

=== February events ===
- February 3 – Twin Peaks Tunnel in San Francisco, California, the longest (11,920 feet or 3,630 metres) streetcar tunnel in the world, opens.
- February 11 – The roof of the Portland–Lewiston Interurban carbarn in Gray, Maine, collapses under heavy snow.

=== March events ===
- March 19 – The United States Congress adopts Standard or "Railroad" time, in use since 1884, as the national standard.
- March 21 – The Railroad Control Act becomes law in the United States, guaranteeing the return to private ownership and administration of America's railroads from the USRA at the end of World War I.
- March 26 – The Council of the People's Commissars in Russia issues a decree "for the centralization of control, the protection of railroads and increase in their capacity."

=== June events ===
- June 22 – Hammond Circus Train Wreck, Hammond, Indiana, United States: The engineer of a troop train operating on the Michigan Central Railroad falls asleep while the train is in motion; he misses several signals and runs his train into the rear of a stopped circus train. Several of the passenger cars are completely destroyed in the collision and catch fire; 86 people die and 127 others are injured in the accident.

=== July events ===
- July 9 – Great train wreck of 1918, Nashville, Tennessee, United States: two Nashville, Chattanooga and St. Louis Railway trains collide head-on. 101 killed, 171 injured; deadliest train accident in United States history.
- July 10 – The Denver and Interurban Railroad, in Colorado ceases all operations; passenger service is replaced with buses.
- July 15 – Atchison, Topeka and Santa Fe Railway opens a new station in San Bernardino, California, to replace the former California Southern Railroad station that was destroyed by fire in 1916.

=== August events ===
- August 10 – Following its second bankruptcy, the Colorado Midland Railway ceases operations, the largest single United States railroad abandonment to this date.
- August 16 – Grand Trunk Railway's freight sheds in Ottawa are destroyed by fire; the loss is estimated at $85,000.

=== September events ===
- September 6 – The Canadian Northern Railway is nationalized, later to become part of Canadian National Railway.

=== October events ===
- October 1 – The Getå Railroad Disaster in Getå, Östergötland, Sweden, kills 41 passengers and the fireman and injures 41 people. It is to date the worst railroad accident in Swedish history.
- October 21 – Canadian Northern Railway opens the Mount Royal Tunnel for regular traffic between Montreal and Toronto.

=== November events ===
- November 1 – The Malbone Street Wreck occurs on the Brooklyn Rapid Transit Company (BRT) in New York City when an inexperienced motorman (pressed into service due to a strike by the Brotherhood of Locomotive Engineers) drives one of the system's subway trains too quickly into a curve, derailing the train in a tunnel and killing 97 and injuring over 100.

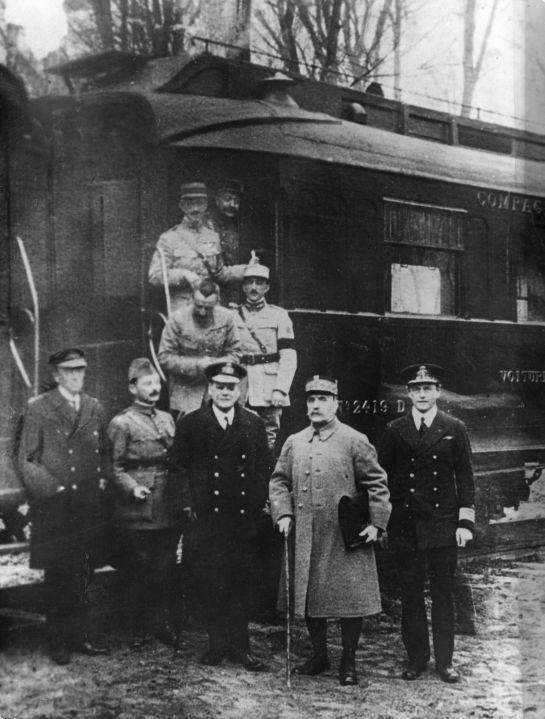
Signatories to the Armistice with Germany (Compiègne), ending World War I, pose outside Marshal Foch's railway carriage.

- November 11 – The Armistice with Germany is signed between 5:12 a.m. and 5:20 a.m. in the "Compiègne Wagon", Marshal Foch’s railway carriage, CIWL #2419, in Compiègne Forest bringing an end to World War I.
- November 15 – Independent Estonian national railway company is established on the basis of Looderaudtee (North-Western Railway), Esimese Juurdeveoteede Selts (First Association of Approach Tracks) and military and other railway lines.
- November 20 – The Government of Canada takes over control of the Canadian Northern Railway, appoints a new board of directors and places the management of the Canadian Government Railways under the new board's control.

=== December events ===
- December 20 – The name "Canadian National Railways" is authorized for use to refer to the collection of railway companies forming Canada's national rail system.

=== Unknown date events ===
- Narrow gauge Catskill Mountain Railway, Otis Elevating Railway, and Catskill and Tannersville Railway end passenger service to the Catskill Mountain House destination resort.
- Julius Kruttschnitt succeeds William Sproule as president of the Southern Pacific Company, parent company of the Southern Pacific Railroad.
- Sir Edward Wentworth Beatty succeeds Thomas George Shaughnessy as president of Canadian Pacific Railway.
- The provincial government of British Columbia, Canada, agrees to take over control of Pacific Great Eastern Railway.

== Deaths ==
=== April deaths ===
- April 13 – Thomas Fremantle, director for London, Brighton and South Coast Railway beginning in 1868 and chairman of same 1896-1908, dies (b. 1830).

=== November deaths ===
- November 7 – Albert Alonzo Robinson, vice president and general manager of Atchison, Topeka and Santa Fe Railway (born 1844).
