= 1944 in rail transport =

This article lists events related to rail transport that occurred in 1944.

== Events ==
=== January events ===
- January 3: Torre del Bierzo rail disaster in Leon Province, Spain. About 100 are killed.
- January 28: A train of Allied prisoners of war on the Orvieto North railway bridge at Allerona in Italy is inadvertently bombed by United States Army Air Forces 320th Bombardment Group. About 450 are killed.

=== February events ===
- c. February: Charles Fairburn succeeds William Stanier as Chief Mechanical Engineer of the London, Midland and Scottish Railway upon Stanier's retirement.

=== March events ===
- March 3: Balvano train disaster, Balvano, Italy: A double-headed mixed train stalls in a tunnel. 521 are killed by carbon monoxide poisoning; five survive. 193 of the dead carrying no identification, most of them Black Marketeers, are buried in a mass grave at the site.
- March 19: The last steam locomotive purchased new by Southern Pacific Railroad, cab forward class AC-12 4-8-8-2 number 4294, enters service.

=== April events ===
- April 1: Government of India takes over the Madras & Southern Mahratta and South Indian Railways.

=== June events ===
- June 6 (D-Day): Normandy landings destroy the narrow gauge Chemins de fer du Calvados.

=== July events ===
- July 6: Troop train crash near Jellico, Tennessee, United States: Passenger train derails due to excessive speed on defective track. 35 killed, 99 injured; all U.S. Army soldiers en route to deployment.
- July 26: Normandy landings: Four British War Department diesel shunters are shipped by landing craft tank from England.

=== September events ===
- September 8: Nickel Plate 765 is built by the Lima Locomotive Works.
- September 13: Fréjus Rail Tunnel blocked by retreating German forces.

=== October events ===
- October 1: Government of India takes over the Bengal Nagpur Railway.
- October 16: The Baltimore & Ohio's last new steam locomotive #5594, Class T-3C rolls out of Mount Clare erecting shop in Baltimore.

=== November events ===
- November 7: Election day accident in Puerto Rico: a passenger train derails at Aguadilla due to excessive speed on a downhill grade; 16 are killed, 50 injured.

=== December events ===
- December: The Union Pacific Railroad takes delivery from Alco of Class FEF-3 4-8-4 #844, the road's last new steam locomotive.

=== Unknown date events ===
- United States builders begin deliveries of Russian locomotive class Ye 2-10-0s to the Soviet Union under Lend-Lease. More than two thousand will be built from now until 1947 to this design, which originated during World War I.
- Fred Gurley succeeds Edward Engel as president of the Atchison, Topeka and Santa Fe Railway.

== Births ==
=== June births ===
- June 11: Michael R. Haverty, president of the Atchison, Topeka and Santa Fe Railway 1989–1995, president of the Kansas City Southern Railway 1995–2008.

=== November births ===
- November 7: E. Hunter Harrison, president of Illinois Central Railroad 1993–1998, Railroader of the Year 2002, president of Canadian National Railway 2003–2009, president and CEO of Canadian Pacific Railway 2012–2017, CEO of CSX Transportation in 2017 (died 2017).

== Deaths ==
=== January deaths ===
- January 8: William Kissam Vanderbilt II, heir to Cornelius Vanderbilt and president of the New York Central system (born 1878).

=== March deaths ===
- March 7: Richard Edward Lloyd Maunsell, Chief mechanical engineer of the Southern Railway (UK) 1923–1937 (born 1868).
- March 21: Hugo Lentz, Austrian inventor of a valve gear for steam engines (born 1859).

=== June deaths ===
- June 19: Richard Deeley, Chief Mechanical Engineer of the Midland Railway 1909–1923 (born 1855).
