= 1832 in rail transport =

This article lists events related to rail transport that occurred in 1832.

== Events ==
=== May events ===
- May 23 – The Festiniog Railway Company Incorporated by Act of Parliament to build a railway from Festiniog to Portmadoc in North Wales for the carriage of slate and other minerals.

=== June events ===
- June 9 – The Strasburg Rail Road, today the oldest short-line railroad in the United States, is incorporated.

=== July events ===
- July 25 – A cable snaps on an incline of the Granite Railway causing the first rail transport related fatality in the United States.

=== November events ===
- November 23 – After assembling Delaware, Matthias W. Baldwin builds his first entirely new steam locomotive, named Old Ironsides.
- November 26 – The New York and Harlem Railroad opens in New York City.

=== December events ===
- December 5 – First rail carriage of United States mail, to West Chester, Pennsylvania, according to some sources.

=== Unknown date events ===
- Matthias W. Baldwin assembles an English-built steam locomotive, the Delaware, for the Newcastle and Frenchtown Railroad; this is the first railroad locomotive that Baldwin works on.
- The Jefferson Works in Paterson, New Jersey, is reorganized as Rogers, Ketchum and Grosvenor (later to become Rogers Locomotive and Machine Works).
- Ross Winans patents the 8-wheel railroad car, but the patent is soon disputed by the Baltimore and Ohio Railroad who call on Gridley Bryant as an expert witness.

== Births ==
=== January births ===
- January 13 – Zerah Colburn, locomotive designer and railroad author (suicide 1870).

=== May births ===
- May 16 – Philip Armour, founder of Armour and Company and subsidiary Armour Refrigerator Line (d. 1901).

=== December births ===
- December 6 – Thaddeus C. Pound, president of Chippewa Falls and Western Railway and St. Paul Eastern Grand Trunk Railway (d. 1914).

== Deaths ==
=== July births ===
- July 25 – Franz Josef Gerstner, Austrian physicist and pioneering railway engineer (b 1756).

=== November deaths ===
- November 14 – Charles Carroll of Carrollton, signer of the Declaration of Independence (United States) and co-founder of the Baltimore and Ohio Railroad (b. 1737).
