= 1730s in rail transport =

- 1720s
- 1730s in rail transport

Rail transport timeline

This article lists events relating to rail transport that occurred during the 1730s.

== 1737 ==
=== Births ===
==== September births ====
- September 20 – Charles Carroll of Carrollton, signer of the Declaration of Independence and a co-founder of the Baltimore and Ohio Railroad (died 1832).

== See also ==
- Years in rail transport

Preceded by 1720s in rail transport	Rail transport timeline 1730s	Succeeded by 1740s in rail transport
