= 1720s in rail transport =

- 1720s in rail transport
- 1730s

Rail transport timeline

This article lists events relating to rail transport that occurred during the 1720s.

== 1722 ==
=== Events ===
==== Unknown date events ====
- Opening of the Tranent to Cockenzie Waggonway, the first wagonway in Scotland, from the coal pits at Tranent to Cockenzie harbour in East Lothian (2.5 mi (4.0 km)).

== 1729 ==
=== Events ===
==== Unknown date events ====
- First known use of cast iron wheels on a wagonway, in the Coalbrookdale district of Shropshire, England.

== See also ==
- Years in rail transport

Preceded by 1710s in rail transport	Rail transport timeline 1720s	Succeeded by 1730s in rail transport
