= 1804 in rail transport =

This article lists events related to rail transport that occurred in 1804.

== Events ==
=== February events ===
- February 21 – The Cornishman Richard Trevithick's newly built "Penydarren" steam locomotive operates on the Merthyr Tramroad between Penydarren Ironworks in Merthyr Tydfil and Abercynon in South Wales, following several trials since February 13, the world's first locomotive to work on rails.

=== June events ===
- June 29 - British Parliamentary approval for the Oystermouth Railway in South Wales is granted, and the first tracks are laid.

== Births ==
- Jean-Jacques Meyer, French steam locomotive designer (d. 1879)
