= 1845 in rail transport =

This article lists events related to rail transport that occurred in 1845.

== Events ==
=== March events ===
- March 19 – Boston and Maine Railroad Extension, which was incorporated a dispute with the Boston and Lowell Railroad over trackage rights rates in Massachusetts, is merged into Boston and Maine Railroad.

=== July events ===
- July – James Hooper succeeds Eleazer Lord as president of the Erie Railroad.
- July 1 – Boston and Maine Railroad opens the extension over the former Boston and Maine Railroad Extension line between Wilmington and Boston.
- July 21 – An unprecedented number of railway acts receive Royal Assent from Queen Victoria in the United Kingdom as the railway mania approaches its peak, Parliament having sanctioned 2,816 mi (4,532 km) of new construction.

=== August events ===
- August – Benjamin Loder succeeds James Hooper as president of the Erie Railroad.

=== October events ===
- October 8 – The Montour Iron Works of Danville rolled the first iron T-rails in Pennsylvania.
- October 22 – First section of the Württemberg Central Railway opens, between Cannstatt und Untertürkheim.

=== Unknown date events ===
- William Swinburne, shop foreman for Rogers, Ketchum and Grosvenor, leaves Rogers to form his own locomotive manufacturing company, Swinburne, Smith and Company.
- Walter McQueen becomes chief mechanical engineer for the Hudson River Railroad.

== Births ==
=== June births ===
- June 24 – Georges Nagelmackers, Belgian founder of the Compagnie Internationale des Wagons-Lits, the company known for the Orient Express trains (d. 1905).

=== September births ===
- September 17 – Calvin S. Brice, president of Lake Erie and Western Railroad, builder of Nickel Plate Road (d. 1898).

=== November births ===
- November 18 – Edwin Winter, president of Northern Pacific Railway in 1868 and Brooklyn Rapid Transit beginning in 1902 (d. 1930).

== Deaths ==
=== January deaths ===
- January 14 – William F. Harnden, founder of Harnden and Company express, first person to send an express shipment by rail (b. 1812).
