= 1841 in rail transport =

This article lists events related to rail transport that occurred in 1841.

== Events ==
=== March events ===
- March 1 – Opening throughout of the Manchester and Leeds Railway, the first to cross the Pennines of England (via Summit Tunnel).
- March 29 – The Glasgow, Paisley and Greenock Railway opened between Glasgow Bridge Street railway station and Greenock.

=== May events ===
- May – James Bowen succeeds Eleazer Lord as president of the Erie Railroad.

=== June events ===
- June 14 – The first section of the Bristol and Exeter Railway's main line is opened between Bristol and Bridgwater in England.
- June 30 – Great Western Railway of England completed throughout between London and Bristol Temple Meads railway station, including Box Tunnel.

=== July events ===
- July 5 – Thomas Cook arranges his first excursion, taking 570 temperance campaigners on the Midland Counties Railway from Leicester to a rally in Loughborough, England.
- July 7 – Opening of the railway from Bordeaux to La Teste in France.

=== September events ===
- September 19 – Inauguration of first international railway line (between Strasbourg (France) and Basel (Switzerland), but with a terminus in Basel; first continuous line October 15, 1843, between Antwerp (Belgium) and Köln (Germany)).
- September 21 – The London and Brighton Railway is opened throughout, in England.

=== Unknown date events ===
- Draughtsman William Howe and pattern-maker William Williams of Robert Stephenson and Company in Newcastle upon Tyne originate Stephenson valve gear for steam locomotives.
- Joseph R. Anderson becomes manager of the American steam locomotive manufacturing firm Tredegar Iron Works.
