= 1826 in rail transport =

This article lists events related to rail transport that occurred in 1826.

== Events ==
=== March events ===
- March 4 – Gridley Bryant's Granite Railway is incorporated.

=== April events ===
- April 1 – Construction begins in Massachusetts on the Granite Railway, one of the first railroads in North America, under the direction of Gridley Bryant.
- April 17 – The Mohawk and Hudson Railroad is chartered to build a railroad between Albany and Schenectady, the first in New York State.

=== May events ===
- May 5 – Liverpool and Manchester Railway, designed by George Stephenson and Joseph Locke, and which in 1830 is to become the world's first purpose-built passenger railway operated by steam locomotives to be opened, is authorised by the Parliament of the United Kingdom.
- May 26 – Edinburgh and Dalkeith Railway in Scotland is authorised by the Parliament of the United Kingdom.

=== October events ===
- October 1 – Opening of the Monkland and Kirkintilloch Railway in Scotland.
- October 7 – The first train operates over the Granite Railway in Massachusetts.

== Births ==
=== January births ===
- January 2 – Algernon S. Buford, president of the Richmond and Danville Railroad (d. 1911).

=== March births ===
- March 4 – Theodore Judah, American engineer who argued the case for construction of the First transcontinental railroad (d. 1863).

=== April births ===
- April 3 – Cyrus K. Holliday, cofounder of Topeka, Kansas, and first president of the Atchison, Topeka and Santa Fe Railroad (d. 1900).

=== November births ===
- November 10 – Oden Bowie, the 34th Governor of the State of Maryland in the United States from 1869 to 1872, founder and first President of the Baltimore and Potomac Railroad and also president of the Baltimore City Passenger Railway.

=== December births ===
- December 1 – William Mahone, American civil engineer and Confederate Army Major General who built the Norfolk and Petersburg Railroad, a predecessor of the Norfolk and Western (d. 1895).

=== Unknown date births ===
- John P. Laird, Scottish engineer, designer and patentee of the two-wheel equalized leading truck for steam locomotives (d. 1882).

== Deaths ==
=== February deaths ===
- February 20 – Matthew Murray, English steam engine manufacturer (b. 1765).
