= 1833 in rail transport =

This article lists events related to rail transport that occurred in 1833.

== Events ==
=== February events ===
- February 15 – The Western Railroad of Massachusetts is chartered to build a railroad between Worcester, Massachusetts, and the New York state line.

=== March events ===
- March 15 – Andover and Wilmington Railroad is incorporated to build a branch from the Boston and Lowell Railroad at Wilmington, Massachusetts, north to Andover, Massachusetts.

=== April events ===
- April 29 – The Utica and Schenectady Railroad is chartered.

=== May events ===
- May 6 – Grand Junction Railway and London and Birmingham Railway are both authorised by the Parliament of the United Kingdom.

=== June events ===
- June 6 – Andrew Jackson rides the Baltimore and Ohio Railroad from Ellicott Mills to Baltimore, first US President to travel by rail during his term of office.

=== September events ===
- September – Eleazer Lord becomes first president of the Erie Railroad.

=== November events ===
- November 8 – The Hightstown rail accident in New Jersey is the first to involve passenger deaths.

=== December events ===
- December 17 – Camden and Amboy Railroad in New Jersey opens throughout.

=== Unknown date events ===
- Tredegar Iron Works, an American steam locomotive manufacturer, is formed in Virginia.
- The Monkland and Kirkintilloch Railway operates a wagon ferry on the Forth and Clyde Canal in Scotland.
- Paterson and Hudson River Railroad is chartered.

== Births ==
=== March births ===
- March 6 – William Stroudley, locomotive and carriage superintendent for Highland Railway 1865–1870; locomotive superintendent at London, Brighton and South Coast Railway's Brighton Works 1870–1889, is born (d. 1889).

== Deaths ==
=== April deaths ===
- April 22 – Richard Trevithick, English inventor and steam locomotive builder (b. 1771).
