= 1835 in rail transport =

This article lists events related to rail transport that occurred in 1835.

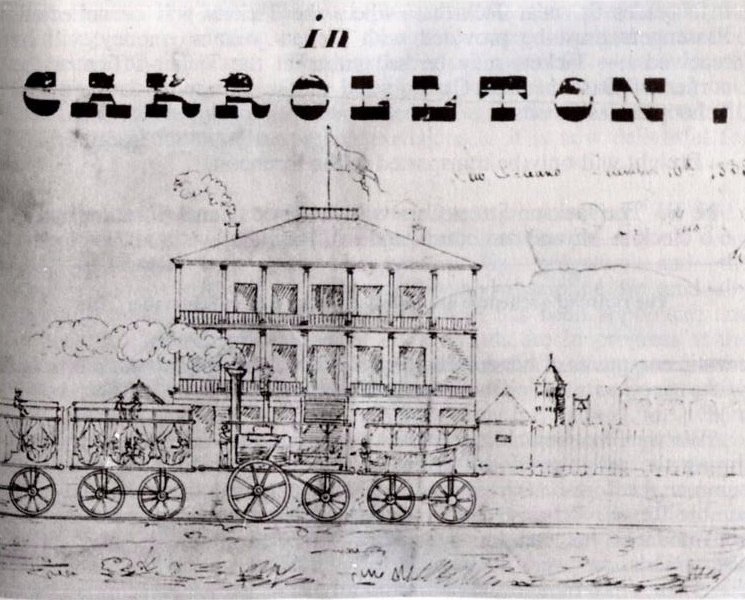
New Orleans & Carrollton Rail Road, Louisiana, 1835.

== Events ==
=== May events ===
- May 5 – The first steam-worked passenger railway in continental Europe is opened, covering the 23 km between Brussels and Mechelen in Belgium.

=== June events ===
- June 27 – Boston and Maine Railroad is chartered in New Hampshire.

=== July events ===
- July 4 – Baltimore and Ohio Railroad's Thomas Viaduct, the first multiple arch stone masonry railroad bridge in the United States, is officially completed. It is also the longest bridge of any kind in the nation, and second longest in the world, next to London Bridge.

=== August events ===
- August 25 – The Baltimore and Ohio Railroad opens its line between Baltimore, Maryland, and Washington, DC.
- August 31 – The Great Western Railway of England is incorporated by Act of Parliament.

=== October events ===
- October 1 – Promoters of the Bristol and Exeter Railway in the south west of England issue a prospectus for the railway's construction.
- October - James G. King succeeds Eleazer Lord as president of the Erie Railroad.

=== December events ===
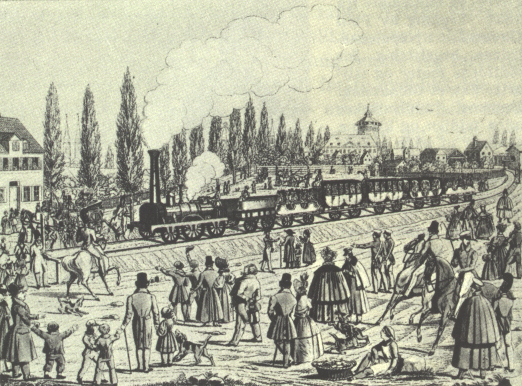
Drawing depicting the operation of the first German railway

- 7 December – Germany's first railroad, the Bayerische Ludwigsbahn, starts regular passenger train service over a distance of 6 km (3¾ miles) between the neighboring cities of Nuremberg and Fürth using a steam locomotive named Adler ("Eagle").
- December – The Wilmington and Raleigh Railroad in North Carolina receives an amending charter.

=== Unknown date events ===
- The first steam locomotive assembled by Rogers Locomotive and Machine Works, the McNeil, manufactured by Robert Stephenson and Company, operates on the Paterson and Hudson River Railroad.

== Births ==
=== March births ===
- March 28 – Matthias N. Forney, American steam locomotive manufacturer (d. 1908).

=== April births ===
- April 2 – Jacob Nash Victor, oversaw construction for California Southern Railroad from San Diego through Cajon Pass to Barstow, California (d. 1907).
- April 10 – Henry Villard, president of Northern Pacific Railroad (d. 1900).

=== May births ===
- May 27 – Charles Francis Adams, Jr., president of Union Pacific Railroad 1884–1890 (d. 1915).

=== June births ===
- June 27 – Fred Harvey (entrepreneur) who developed the Harvey House chain of restaurants and hotels serving passengers of the Atchison, Topeka and Santa Fe Railway (d. 1901).

=== November births ===
- November 25 – Andrew Carnegie, steel magnate and owner of Pittsburgh Locomotive and Car Works (d. 1919).
