= 1839 in rail transport =

This article lists events related to rail transport that occurred in 1839.

== Events ==
=== January events ===
- January 1 – The New Jersey Railroad and Transportation Company opens its route between Trenton and New Brunswick, New Jersey.

=== March events ===
- March 4 – William F. Harnden, founder of Harnden and Company, becomes the first person to send an express shipment by rail when he ships an express package from Boston, Massachusetts, to Providence, Rhode Island, on the Boston and Providence Rail Road.
- March 5 – Bristol and Exeter Railway adopts 7 ft (2,134 mm) for its track gauge.
- March 12 – Maine, New Hampshire and Massachusetts Railroad is incorporated in Maine.

=== April events ===
- April 3 – Andover and Haverhill Railroad reorganizes and changes its name for a second time to Boston and Portland Railroad, reflecting plans to extend its line to Portland, Maine.

=== June events ===
- June 4 – The London and Southampton Railway is renamed the London and South Western Railway.

=== August events ===
- August 12
  - Ulster Railway opened between Belfast and Lisburn, on 6 ft 2 in (1,880 mm) gauge.
  - The Birmingham and Derby Junction Railway in England opens.

=== September events ===
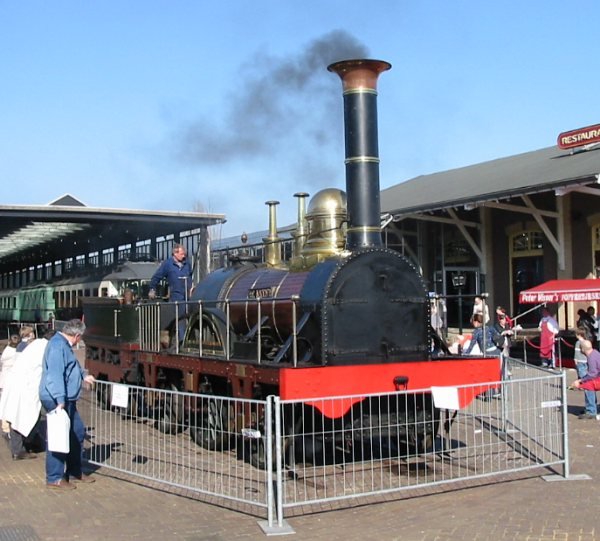
Arend (1939 replica)

- September 20 – Official opening of the first railway line in the Netherlands, locomotive De Arend, broad gauge (1945 mm).
- September 24 – The first railway line in the Netherlands, 19 km between Amsterdam and Haarlem, opens for the public.
- September 26 – The Taunus Railway opens its route between the Free City of Frankfurt and Höchst, Duchy of Nassau.

=== October events ===
- October 3 – The first railway line in Italy, 7 km between Naples and Portici, opens.
- October 19 – George Bradshaw publishes the world's first collective railway timetable book in Manchester, England.
- October – Eleazer Lord succeeds James G. King for a second term as president of the Erie Railroad.

== Births ==
=== June births ===
- June 24 – Gustavus Franklin Swift, American founder of Swift and Company which pioneered the use of refrigerator cars in late 19th century America (died 1903).

=== July births ===
- July 17 – Ephraim Shay, American inventor of the Shay locomotive (died 1916).
- July 22 – David Moffat, Colorado railroad financier (died 1911).

=== August births ===
- August 20 – Gaston du Bousquet, French steam locomotive designer (died 1910).

=== December births ===
- December 8 – Alexander J. Cassatt, president of the Pennsylvania Railroad 1899–1906 (died 1906).
