= 1867 in rail transport =

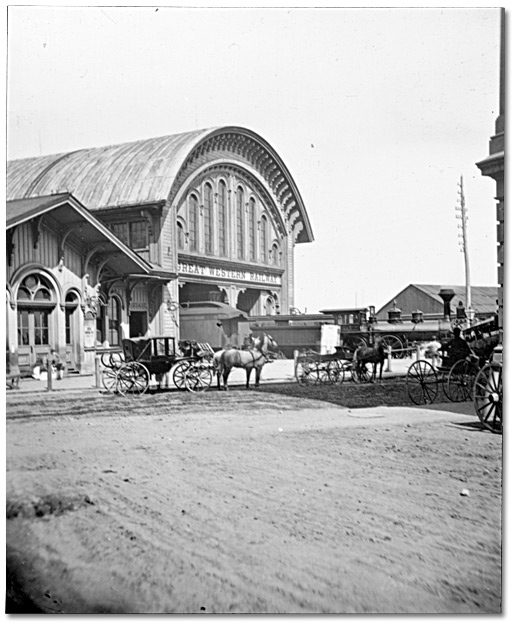
Great Western Railway Station, Toronto (1867)

This article lists events related to rail transport that occurred in 1867.

== Events ==
=== February events ===
- February 16 – The São Paulo Railway in Brazil is opened, including an incline system on the Serra do Mar.

=== April events ===
- April 18 – Bristol and Exeter Railway's Portishead branch, built by the Bristol and Portishead Pier and Railway Company, opens.

=== May events ===
- May 7 – The Windsor and Annapolis Railway is incorporated in Nova Scotia.

=== June events ===
- June 29 – The Warrington rail crash in England kills 8 people.

=== August events ===
- August 10 – The first railway in Indonesia (Dutch East Indies) (and the first in Asia outside the Indian subcontinent) opens between Semarang and Tanggun in central Java (25 kilometres (16 mi).
- August 21 – The rack railway at Mount Morgan, Queensland, Australia, opens between Rockhampton and Westwood via Kabra.
- August 24 – Opening of railway over the Brenner Pass between Austria and Italy.
- August 27 – J. Nason and J. F. Wilson, both of Boston, Massachusetts, are awarded the first U.S. patent covering level crossing gates.

=== September events ===
- September 4 – The Boston and Albany Railroad is formed through the merger of four smaller railroads in New England.

=== October events ===
- October – John S. Eldridge succeeds Robert H. Berdell as president of the Erie Railroad.

=== November events ===
- November 19 – The Denver Pacific Railway and Telegraph Company incorporated.

=== December events ===
- December 1 – Skjærdalen and Tyristrand are connected on the Randsfjorden Line in Norway.
- December 9 – The Lyttelton rail tunnel in New Zealand of 2595m between Christchurch and the port of Lyttelton is opened.
- December 18 – The 'Angola Horror' train wreck kills 49 people near Angola, New York when the last coach of a Lake Shore train derails and plunges down a gulley.

=== Unknown date events ===
- Cornelius Vanderbilt acquires control of the New York Central railroad.
- The Lehigh Valley Railroad places the first 2-10-0 steam locomotives in the world into use.
- Construction on the Union Pacific Railroad reaches Cheyenne, Wyoming.
- An early form of dome car is introduced in Russia.
- Construction on the Kansas Pacific Railway reaches Salina, Kansas.

== Births ==
=== Unknown date births ===
- Carl R. Gray, president of the Union Pacific Railroad 1920–1937 (d. 1939).

== Deaths ==
=== January deaths ===
- January 5 – William Norris, American steam locomotive builder and founder of Norris Locomotive Works (b. 1802).

=== February deaths ===
- February 7 – William Dargan, Irish railway contractor (b. 1799).

=== June deaths ===
- June 13 - Gridley Bryant, inventor of many basic railroad technologies including track and wheels (b. 1789).
