= 1818 in rail transport =

This article lists events related to rail transport that occurred in 1818.

== Events ==
- November 13 – Public meeting in Darlington, England, resolves to promote a Stockton and Darlington Railway.

== Births ==
- April 4 – Robert Pearson Brereton, chief assistant to Isambard Kingdom Brunel who completed many engineering projects after Brunel's death in 1859 (d. 1894)
- July 22 – J. Gregory Smith, president of Northern Pacific Railway 1866–1872, is born (died 1891)

=== Unknown date births ===
- Septimus Norris, steam locomotive designer often credited as the designer of the first 4-6-0 (died 1862)

== See also ==
- Years in rail transport
