= 1844 in rail transport =

This article lists events related to rail transport that occurred in 1844.

== Events ==
=== February events ===
- February 7 – The South Eastern Railway (England) is officially opened throughout from London to Dover.

=== March events ===
- March 16 – Boston and Maine Railroad Extension is incorporated due to a dispute with the Boston and Lowell Railroad over trackage rights rates between Wilmington and Boston.
- March 29 – Atmospheric railway opened between Kingstown (Dún Laoghaire) and Dalkey in Ireland.

=== May events ===
- May 1 – The Bristol and Exeter Railway extension to Exeter in England opens.
- May 6 – J. M. W. Turner's painting Rain, Steam and Speed - The Great Western Railway is first exhibited, at the Royal Academy in London.
- May 10 – The Midland Railway in England is formed by a merger of the Midland Counties Railway, the North Midland Railway and the Birmingham and Derby Junction Railway.

=== June events ===
- June 15 – Opening of first railway in Switzerland, from Basel to St Ludwig (modern-day Saint-Louis, Haut-Rhin) in France (6.4 km).

=== July events ===
- July 4 – South Devon Railway in England obtains its authorising Act of Parliament.

=== August events ===
- August 9 – In the United Kingdom, the Railway Regulation Act 1844 (officially: An Act to attach certain Conditions to the Construction of future Railways) requires every railway company to run at least one passenger train a day in both directions along the length of each of its lines, calling at every station. The maximum fare for journeys by these trains (soon to become known as Parliamentaries) is fixed at one penny per mile (1.6 km), and it is a further requirement of the Act that the carriages used on these trains be provided with seats and afford passengers protection from the weather.

=== October events ===
- October – Eleazer Lord succeeds Horatio Allen for a third term as president of the Erie Railroad.

=== Unknown date events ===
- Egide Walschaerts of the Belgian State Railways originates Walschaerts valve gear for steam locomotives.

== Births ==
=== March births ===
- March 6 – Frederick J. Kimball, American civil engineer instrumental in formation of Norfolk and Western (d. 1903).

=== April births ===
- April 5 – R. J. Billinton, English Locomotive, Carriage, Wagon and Marine Superintendent of the London, Brighton and South Coast Railway 1890–1904 (d. 1904).

=== June births ===
- June 21 – Ernest F. Cambier, Belgian colonial pioneer, establishes the first Congo railway (d. 1909).

=== August births ===
- August 6 – James Henry Greathead, English inventor of the tunnelling shield used for the London Underground (d. 1896).

=== October births ===
- October 21 – Albert Alonzo Robinson, vice president and general manager of Atchison, Topeka and Santa Fe Railway, is born (d. 1918).
