= 1848 in rail transport =

This article lists events related to rail transport that occurred in 1848.

== Events ==
=== February events ===
- February 15 – The Caledonian Railway is opened to the public throughout between Edinburgh and Carstairs in Scotland and Carlisle in England, completing a through rail route by the West Coast Main Line and providing the first service of through carriages between Scotland and England.
- February 18 – The Cleveland, Painesville and Ashtabula Railroad, a predecessor of the Lake Shore and Michigan Southern Railway, is chartered in Ohio.

=== March events ===
- March – The Glasgow, Paisley, Kilmarnock and Ayr Railway completes its Ballochmyle Viaduct, designed by John Miller. The main arch of 181 feet (55 m) span, carrying the rails 169 feet (52 m) above the River Ayr, is the world's longest masonry span. This section of line is opened to traffic on 9 August.

=== April events ===
- April 3 – The Joseph Valley Railroad, a predecessor of the Lake Shore and Michigan Southern Railway, is chartered in Michigan.

=== May events ===
- May 1 – Opening for Chester and Holyhead Railway traffic of the first tube of Robert Stephenson's Conwy Railway Bridge in north Wales.
- May 12 – Waterford and Kilkenny Railway in Ireland opens between Kilkenny and Thomastown.
- May 22 – The Scottish Central Railway opens to Perth railway station, Scotland, including the 1,220 yd (1,120 m) Moncrieff Tunnel on the southern approach to Perth.

=== June events ===
- June 12 – The Bristol and Exeter Railway's Tiverton branch line opens.

=== July events ===
- July – Henschel & Son turn out the first locomotive from their works in Kassel.
- July 11 – London Waterloo station opens.
- July 20 – Grand Trunk Railway predecessor Atlantic and St. Lawrence Railroad opens.

=== September events ===
- September 10 – Use of the atmospheric system on Isambard Kingdom Brunel's South Devon Railway (England) ceases after less than a year of operation.

=== October events ===
- October 2 – The Skipton to Colne section of the Leeds and Bradford Extension Railway opened.
- October 28 – The first railway in Spain, connecting Barcelona and Mataró, opens.

=== November events ===
- November 1 – First W H Smith bookstall at a railway station opens, at Euston Station, in London.
- November 3 – The first railway in South America opens, from Georgetown to Plaisance (8 km (5.0 mi)) in British Guiana.

=== December events ===
- December – The Galena and Chicago Union Railroad, the oldest part of what is to become the Chicago and North Western Railway, begins operation.

=== Unknown date events ===
- Tredegar Iron Works (Richmond, Virginia) manager Joseph R. Anderson becomes the owner of the company.

== Births ==
=== February births ===
- February 20 – E. H. Harriman, executive in charge of both the Union Pacific Railroad and the Southern Pacific Railroad at the start of the 20th century (died 1909).

=== April births ===
- April 12 – Alonzo C. Mather, founder of Mather Stock Car Company, designer of first widely recognized humane stock car (died 1941).

=== September births ===
- September 15 – Alfred de Glehn, English-born designer of French steam locomotives (died 1936).

== Deaths ==
=== August deaths ===
- August 12 – George Stephenson, English steam locomotive builder (born 1781).
