= 1834 in rail transport =

This article lists events related to rail transport that occurred in 1834.

== Events ==
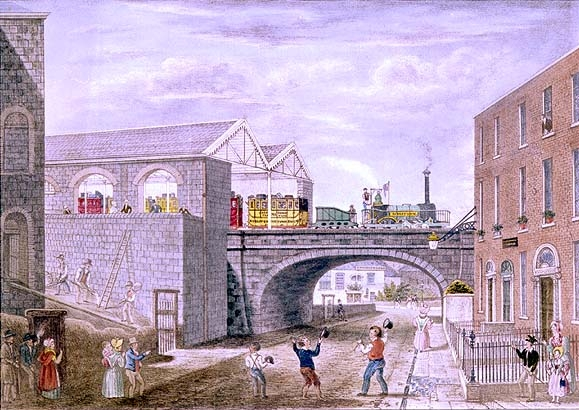
Dublin and Kingstown Railway

=== January events ===
- January – The Wilmington and Raleigh Railroad is chartered in Wilmington, North Carolina.
- January 30 – Construction on the first railroad in Kentucky, linking Lexington and Frankfort, is completed.

=== February events ===
- February 25 – The Richmond, Fredericksburg and Potomac Railroad is formed to connect cities in Virginia.

=== March events ===
- March 25 – The Canterbury and Whitstable Railway in England offers season tickets from this date.

=== April events ===
- April 14 – The Long Island Rail Road is incorporated in New York.

=== September events ===
- September 22 – The Leeds and Selby Railway in the north of England is officially opened; at 700 yards (640 m) long, its Marsh Lane tunnel through Richmond Hill, Leeds, near its Marsh Lane terminus is the world's longest railway tunnel at this date and the first through which passengers are hauled by locomotives.

=== December events ===
- December 17 – The Dublin and Kingstown Railway, the first public railway in Ireland, opens between Westland Row, Dublin (modern-day Dublin Pearse railway station) and Kingstown (modern-day Dún Laoghaire), on the standard gauge.

=== Unknown date events ===
- The Castleton and West Stockbridge Railroad is chartered to build a railroad between Albany, New York, and the Massachusetts state line.

== Births ==
=== April births ===
- April 1 – Jim Fisk, American financier who worked with Daniel Drew for control of the Erie Railroad (d. 1872).
- April 23 – Chauncey Depew, president of New York Central Railroad (d. 1928).
