= 1831 in rail transport =

This article lists events related to rail transport that occurred in 1831.

== Events ==
=== February events ===
- February 18 – The West Chester Railroad is chartered in Pennsylvania.

=== April events ===
- April 23 – the Pontchartrain Rail-Road begins operation.
- April 25
  - Matthias W. Baldwin displays a model steam locomotive at the Philadelphia City Museum a year before building his first full-size locomotive for a working railroad.
  - The New York and Harlem Railroad is incorporated as a passenger carrier.

=== May events ===
- May – Members of a Manchester (England) Sunday School are conveyed by a special train on the Liverpool and Manchester Railway to Liverpool, the first recorded private railway excursion.

=== June events ===
- June 17 - The first boiler explosion in the United States occurs when the engineer on the Best Friend of Charleston ties the steam safety pressure release valve shut.
- June 18 – The John Bull is constructed by Robert Stephenson and Company in England.
- June 21 – The Boston and Providence Rail Road is incorporated and chartered to build a railroad connection between Boston, Massachusetts, and Providence, Rhode Island.
- June 23 – The Boston and Worcester Railroad is chartered to build a railroad between its namesake cities in Massachusetts.

=== July events ===
- July 1 – The first railroad built in Virginia, the Chesterfield Railroad, begins operations.
- July 4 – Opening of first section of Edinburgh and Dalkeith Railway in Scotland including St Leonards Tunnel, Scotland's earliest tunnel on a public railway.

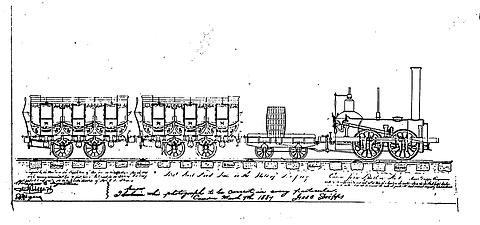
The John Bull and train as it looked in 1831; drawn by Isaac Dripps in 1887. (Image from the collection of the National Museum of American History, Smithsonian Institution, America On The Move exhibit, used with permission)

- July 14 – The John Bull departs Liverpool aboard the steamship Allegheny bound for Philadelphia, Pennsylvania.

=== August events ===
- August 9 – The Mohawk and Hudson Railroad, the first railroad built in New York state, opens.

=== September events ===
- September 4 – The John Bull arrives in Philadelphia, Pennsylvania from Liverpool.
- September 15 – The John Bull is operated for the first time on the Camden and Amboy Railroad.
- September 24 – The Mohawk and Hudson Railroad opens between Albany and Schenectady, New York.

=== November events ===
- November 12 – Robert L. Stevens, president of the Camden and Amboy Railroad hosts a demonstration run of the John Bull for New Jersey politicians and dignitaries.

=== Unknown date events ===
- First rail carriage of United States mail, by South Carolina Canal and Rail Road Company, according to some sources.
- John B. Jervis becomes the chief engineer for the Mohawk and Hudson Railroad, a predecessor of the New York Central.

== Births ==
=== January births ===
- January 14 – William D. Washburn, first president of Soo Line Railroad 1883–1889, is born (d. 1912).

=== March births ===
- March 3 – George Pullman, American inventor and industrialist, founder of the Pullman Company (d. 1897)

=== August births ===
- August 26 – T. Jefferson Coolidge, president of Atchison, Topeka and Santa Fe Railway 1880–1881 (d. 1920).

=== Unknown date births ===
- Eli H. Janney, inventor of the knuckle coupler (d. 1912).
