= 1847 in rail transport =

This article lists events related to rail transport that occurred in 1847.

== Events ==
=== February events ===
- February 26 – The Somerville and Easton Railroad, a predecessor of the Central Railroad of New Jersey, is chartered.

=== March events ===
- March 9 – The Richmond and Danville Railroad is chartered in Virginia.
- March 15 – The Amiens-Boulogne line in France opens between Abbeville and Étaples.
- March 16 – The Leeds and Bradford Extension Railway opens between Shipley and Keighley in West Yorkshire, England.
- March – First ever 4-6-0 locomotive, the Chesapeake, completed by the Norris Locomotive Works for the Philadelphia and Reading Railroad.

=== April events ===
- April 19 – The Mohawk and Hudson Railroad, a predecessor of the New York Central Railroad, officially changes its name to Albany and Schenectady Railroad.

=== May events ===
- May 24 – The Dee bridge disaster: a cast iron girder bridge across the river Dee at Chester, England, designed by Robert Stephenson for the Chester and Holyhead Railway, collapses under a Shrewsbury and Chester Railway train with five fatalities.
- May 31 – The first railway connection between Rotterdam and The Hague opens in the Netherlands.

=== June events ===
- June – The first Bradshaws Continental Railway Guide timetable is published by George Bradshaw in England.
- June 26 – Opening of first railway wholly within modern-day Denmark, from Copenhagen to Roskilde.

=== July events ===
- July 9 – The Lancashire and Yorkshire Railway is incorporated as an amalgamation of several important railway lines in Northern England.
- July 28 – Bristol and Exeter Railway's Clevedon branch line opens.

=== August events ===
- August 9 – Opening of first railway wholly within Switzerland, the Swiss Northern Railway from Zürich to Baden.

=== September events ===
- September 22 – The Railway Clearing House in Great Britain recommends that Greenwich Mean Time be adopted as the standard time for all railways in the United Kingdom.

=== October events ===
- October – Portland Company's locomotive erecting shops opened for business.

=== December events ===
- December 1
  - The London and North Western Railway opens its Trent Valley Line to give a more direct route for the West Coast Main Line to North West England, bypassing Birmingham.
  - The first time zone in the world is established by British railways with GMT hand-carried on chronometers.

=== Unknown date events ===
- John Urpeth Rastrick retires from Foster, Rastrick and Company, the English firm that built the first steam locomotives for the Delaware and Hudson Railroad.

== Births ==
=== October births ===
- October 6 – Webb C. Ball, watchmaker who introduced the first truly reliable and accurate timepieces on American railroads.

== Deaths ==
- November 16 – Thomas Kirtley, locomotive superintendent of North Midland Railway 1843–1844, and London, Brighton and South Coast Railway in 1847, dies (b. 1811).
