= 1810 in rail transport =

This article lists events related to rail transport that occurred in 1810.

== Events ==
=== May events ===
- May 24 – Monmouth Railway authorised by Act of Parliament in the United Kingdom for a railway or tramroad from the Forest of Dean to Monmouth, on the Welsh Borders, including provision to charge for passengers.

=== Unknown date events ===
- The Leiper Railroad connecting Crum Creek to Ridley Creek, Pennsylvania opens.

== Births ==
=== January births ===
- January 3 – Henry Keyes, president of the Atchison, Topeka and Santa Fe Railway 1869–1870 (d. 1870).

=== April births ===
- April 15 – Whitmell P. Tunstall, first president of the Richmond and Danville Railroad (d. 1854).
- April 17 – Isaac Dripps, mechanical engineer for the Camden and Amboy Railroad who assembled the John Bull (d. 1892).

=== June births ===
- June 12 – David Levy Yulee, Florida railroad executive (d. 1886).

=== July births ===
- July 27 – H. H. Hunnewell, director for Illinois Central Railroad 1862-1871, president of Kansas City, Fort Scott and Gulf Railroad, president of Kansas City, Lawrence and Southern Railroad, is born (died 1902).

=== September births ===
- September 19 – Thomas Nickerson, president of the Atchison, Topeka and Santa Fe Railway 1874–1880 (d. 1892).

=== Unknown date births ===
- Joseph Harrison Jr., partner in the American steam locomotive manufacturing firm of Eastwick and Harrison (d. 1874).
- William S. Hudson, superintendent of American steam locomotive manufacturing firm of Rogers, Ketchum and Grosvenor (d. 1881).
