= 1822 in rail transport =

This article lists events related to rail transport that occurred in 1822.

== Events ==
=== May events ===
- May 24 – The first rail of the Stockton and Darlington Railway is laid in ceremonial style at Stockton-on-Tees by the Chairman of the company, Thomas Meynell.

=== November events ===
- November 18 – The Hetton colliery railway, near Sunderland, England, opens for locomotive traction, being designed by George Stephenson to be wholly steam worked.

== Births ==
=== September births ===
- September 16 – Charles Crocker, a member of The Big Four group of financiers in California (d. 1888).
