= Chippewa Falls and Western Railway =

The Chippewa Falls and Western Railway built a rail line from Eau Claire, Wisconsin to Chippewa Falls in 1875, giving the Falls its first rail connection to the outside world.

The West Wisconsin Railway had reached Eau Claire in 1870, connecting the town to Milwaukee. The line was later extended to St. Paul, bypassing Chippewa Falls.

The Chippewa Falls and Western Railway was incorporated in 1873. In June 1875 it built 10.5 miles of track from Eau Claire to Chippewa Falls, giving Chippewa a rail connection to Milwaukee, St. Paul, and places beyond. The CF&WR was sold in 1884 to the Minnesota, Saint Croix and Wisconsin Railroad, which merged into the Wisconsin Central Company later that year.
