= 1801 in rail transport =

This article lists events related to rail transport that occurred in 1801.

== Events ==
=== May ===
- May 21 – The Surrey Iron Railway in England is authorised by the Parliament of the United Kingdom, the first railway company established by statute and independently of a canal company.

=== December ===
- December 24 – Richard Trevithick demonstrates the first full-sized road locomotive to the public, successfully carrying a number of men up Beacon Hill, Camborne in Cornwall.

== Births ==
- September 8 – Byron Kilbourn, president of the Milwaukee and Mississippi Railroad 1849–1852 (d. 1870).
