= 1855 in rail transport =

This article lists events related to rail transport that occurred in 1855.

== Events ==
=== January events ===
- January 8 – The first through train travels the entire distance from Chicago to the Ohio River at Cairo, Illinois.
- January 28 – The Panama Railway becomes the first railroad to connect the Atlantic Ocean and the Pacific Ocean as the first train travels the entire transcontinental route across Panama.

=== February events ===
- February 15 – The North Carolina General Assembly incorporates the Western North Carolina Railroad to build a rail line from Salisbury to the western part of the state.
- February 23 – The Hudson and Boston Railroad is chartered as the successor to the Hudson and Berkshire Railroad in New York.

=== March events ===
- March – The Chicago, St. Paul and Fond du Lac Railroad, whose purchase formed the basis of the Chicago & North Western, begins operations.

=== April events ===
- April 5 – Opening of Boyne Viaduct at Drogheda by the Dublin and Belfast Junction Railway completes permanent through rail communication between the two principal cities of Ireland.

=== May events ===
- May 15 – Great Gold Robbery from a train between London Bridge and Folkestone in England.

=== July events ===
- July 21 – Beyer, Peacock & Company turn out the first locomotive to be completed at its new works in the Gorton district of Manchester, England, for the Great Western Railway.

=== September events ===
- September 26 – In Australia the first section of the New South Wales Government Railways, from Sydney to Parramatta, is opened, on 4 ft 8 1/2 in (1,435 mm) gauge.

=== November events ===
- November 1 – Gasconade Bridge train disaster, St Louis, Missouri, United States: With more than 600 passengers aboard the Pacific Railroad excursion train celebrating the railway line's opening, outside St. Louis, Missouri the bridge collapsed and the locomotive plus 12 of the 13 attached cars plunged into the Gasconade River. Over 30 people died and hundreds were seriously injured.
- November 6 – Inverness and Nairn Railway opened in Scotland: precursor of the Highland Railway.
- November 20 – The first train to operate in Iowa on the Chicago, Rock Island & Pacific Railroad departs Davenport for Muscatine with six crowded passenger cars.

=== December events ===
- December – Rogers Locomotive & Machine Works completes a 4-4-0 steam locomotive named General; this locomotive will later become the main object in the Great Locomotive Chase of the American Civil War.

=== Unknown date events ===
- The Wilmington and Raleigh Railroad in North Carolina is reorganized as the Wilmington and Weldon Railroad.

== Births ==
=== August births ===
- August 20 – Ira G. Rawn, vice president of operations for Illinois Central Railroad 1907–1909; president of Monon Railroad 1909–1910 (d. 1910).

=== October births ===
- October 24 – Richard Deeley, Chief Mechanical Engineer of the Midland Railway 1909–1923 (d. 1944).

=== November births ===
- November 5 – Eugene V. Debs, labor leader, founding member of the Brotherhood of Locomotive Firemen, founder of the American Railway Union, arrested during the Pullman strike in Chicago, Illinois (d. 1926).
