= 1830 in rail transport =

This article lists events related to rail transport that occurred in 1830.

== Events ==
=== January events ===
- January 7 – The Baltimore and Ohio Rail Road opens its first section, 1 1/2 miles (2.4 km), in Baltimore, Maryland, U.S.A.
- January 9 – Ground is broken in Charleston, South Carolina, for the first railroad to use steam locomotives in South Carolina, the South Carolina Canal and Rail Road.

=== February events ===
- February 4 – The Camden and Amboy Rail Road, the first railroad to be built in New Jersey, is chartered.

=== March events ===
- March 15 – The New Orleans, Louisiana, City Council approves the right of way for the construction of the Pontchartrain Rail-Road.

=== May events ===
- May 3 – Ceremonial opening of the Canterbury and Whitstable Railway in England. The steam locomotive Invicta is used on a level section of the route.
- May 22 – The Baltimore and Ohio Rail Road completes construction on the line between Baltimore and Ellicott's Mills, Maryland.
- May 24 – The first revenue trains on the Baltimore and Ohio Rail Road operate between Baltimore and Ellicott's Mills, Maryland, a distance of 13 miles (21 km).

=== August events ===
Slightly fanciful contemporary depiction of Liverpool and Manchester Railway

- Construction begins on the Mohawk and Hudson Railroad between Albany and Schenectady, New York.
- August 28 – In a race between the Baltimore and Ohio Rail Road's Tom Thumb and a stagecoach near Ellicott's Mills, Maryland, the horse and coach wins.

=== September events ===
- September 15 – The Liverpool and Manchester Railway, the world's first purpose built passenger railway operated by steam locomotives, opens in England from Liverpool Road, Manchester, to Edge Hill, Liverpool.
- September 18 – Robert Stephenson is appointed to survey the London and Birmingham Railway.

=== November events ===
- November 11 – The first transit of mail via railways occurs between Liverpool and Manchester, England.

=== December events ===
- December 25 – The South Carolina Canal and Rail Road begins operations.

=== Unknown date events ===
- The Boston and Maine Railroad is formed to build a railroad between Boston, Massachusetts, and Portland, Maine.

== Births ==
=== January births ===
- January 2 – Henry Morrison Flagler, visionary and builder of Florida East Coast Railway (d. 1913).
- January 30 – Thomas Fremantle, director of London, Brighton and South Coast Railway from 1868 and chairman 1896–1908 (d. 1918).

=== April births ===
- April 5 (probable date) – Robert F. Fairlie, Scottish-born steam locomotive designer (d. 1885).

=== July births ===
- July 29 – Robert Harris, president of Northern Pacific Railway 1884-1888 (d. 1894).

== Deaths ==
=== September deaths ===
- September 15 – William Huskisson, the popular MP for Liverpool, at the opening of the Liverpool and Manchester Railway, misjudges the speed of the approaching locomotive Rocket and is run over, becoming the world's first railway passenger fatality (b. 1770).

== Miscellaneous ==
The board game 1830: The Game of Railroads and Robber Barons and its video game adaptation has players lead railroad companies in the United States during the year 1830.
