= 1842 in rail transport =

This article lists events related to rail transport that occurred in 1842.

== Events ==
=== January events ===
- January 1 – Boston and Maine Railroad, Maine, New Hampshire and Massachusetts Railroad and Boston and Portland Railroad merge with the new company keeping the Boston & Maine name.
- January 2 — Commencement of operation of the Railway Clearing House in London, established to settle the division of payments for through traffic over different railways in Britain.
- January 24 — Frederick William IV of Prussia makes the first train journey by a reigning monarch.

=== February events ===
- February 21 — Edinburgh and Glasgow Railway opens in Scotland.

=== March events ===
- March 31 — The Middleton Junction and Oldham Branch Railway opens to Oldham Werneth railway station in northwest England.

=== April events ===
- April 11 — The French government enacts the Loi relative à l'établissement des grandes lignes de chemins de fer which establishes the plan for French railroads' placement in a star pattern centered on Paris.

=== May events ===
- May 1 — Opening of first section of Upper Silesian Railway, between Wrocław and Oława, the first line within the borders of modern-day Poland. By August it reaches Brzeg.
- May 8 — Versailles rail accident: A train traveling between Versailles and Paris derails due to a broken locomotive axle near Moudon and catches fire, killing at least 55 passengers in the locked carriages.

=== June events ===
- June 13 — Queen Victoria makes the first train journey by a reigning British monarch, on the Great Western Railway of England (Slough to Paddington).

=== July events ===
- July 1 – The Bristol and Exeter Railway extension to Taunton opens in England.

=== September events ===
- September — Robert Davidson's experimental battery-electric locomotive Galvani is demonstrated on the Edinburgh and Glasgow Railway.

=== December events ===
- December — William Maxwell succeeds James Bowen as president of the Erie Railroad.

== Births ==
=== October births ===
- October 12 — Robert Gillespie Reid, builder of many Canadian railway bridges as well as the Newfoundland Railway (d. 1908).

=== December births ===
- December 7 — George Whale, Chief Mechanical Engineer of the London and North Western Railway 1903–1909 (d. 1910).

=== Unknown date births ===
- George Frederick Baer, president of Reading Company (d. 1914).
- Melville E. Ingalls, president of the Cleveland, Cincinnati, Chicago and St. Louis Railroad (d. 1914).
