= 1807 in rail transport =

This article lists events related to rail transport that occurred in 1807.

== Events ==
=== March ===
- March 25 – The first railway passenger service begins, on the Oystermouth Railway in South Wales. The cars are drawn by horses.

=== May ===
- May - closure of the Low Moor Waggonway

== Births ==
=== January births ===
- January 9 – Matthias von Schönerer, Austrian railway engineer (d. 1881).

=== March births ===
- March 27 – James P. Kirkwood, designer of Starrucca Viaduct in the United States (d. 1877).

=== November births ===
- November 5 – Oliver Ames Jr., president of Union Pacific Railroad 1866–1871, brother of Oakes Ames (d. 1877).

=== December births ===
- December 16 – William H. Aspinwall, American financier who helped build the Panama Railway (d. 1875).
