= 1823 in rail transport =

This article lists events related to rail transport that occurred in 1823.

== Events ==
=== June ===
- June 23 – Robert Stephenson, his father George Stephenson, Edward Pease and Michael Longridge form Robert Stephenson and Company in Newcastle upon Tyne, England, to build steam locomotives.

== Births ==
=== September ===
- September 27 – Frederick H. Billings, president of Northern Pacific Railway 1879–1881, is born (d. 1890).

=== December ===
- December 28 – Thomas Alexander Scott, president of Union Pacific Railroad 1871–1872 (d. 1881).
