= 1815 in rail transport =

This article lists events related to rail transport that occurred in 1815.

== Events ==
=== February events ===
- February 6 – The first railroad charter in the United States is issued to the New Jersey Railroad Company, a railroad that ultimately was never built.

=== May or June events ===
- Bryn Oer Tramway in South Wales opened.

=== July events ===
- July 31 – The boiler explosion of a locomotive designed by William Brunton on the Newbottle Waggonway in North East England kills around a dozen people, the first railway disaster.

== Births ==
=== January births ===
- January 21 - Daniel McCallum, Scottish-born General Superintendent of New York and Erie Railroad 1855–1858 (d. 1878).

=== March births ===
- March 24 - Edward Entwistle, first driver of the Rocket locomotive (d. 1909).
