= 1821 in rail transport =

This article lists events related to rail transport that occurred in 1821.

== Events ==
=== April event ===
- April 19 – Stockton and Darlington Railway is authorised by the Parliament of the United Kingdom.

=== November event ===
- November – Henry Robinson Palmer patents a monorail system in England.

== Births ==
=== May births ===
- May 8 – William Henry Vanderbilt, son of Cornelius Vanderbilt and president of the New York Central system (d. 1885).

=== August births ===
- August 10 – Jay Cooke, financier who built the Northern Pacific Railway (d. 1905).
- August 17 – John Saxby, English railway signalling engineer (d. 1913).

=== October births ===
- October 21 - Collis P. Huntington, a member of The Big Four group of financiers in California (d. 1900).

=== December births ===
- December 17 - Frederick W. Lander, Chief Civil Engineer for the Pacific Railroad (d. 1862).
