= 1828 in rail transport =

This article lists events related to rail transport that occurred in 1828.

== Events ==
=== February events ===
- February – The Chesterfield Railroad, the first railroad built in Virginia is chartered.

=== March events ===
- March 24 – Pennsylvania's first state-owned railway, the Philadelphia and Columbia Railway, is authorized by the state legislature.

=== July events ===
- July 4 – Construction begins on the Baltimore and Ohio Railroad in Baltimore, Maryland, when Charles Carroll of Carrollton lays the first stone for the Carrollton Viaduct, the first stone masonry railroad bridge in the United States.

=== August events ===
- August 1 – The Bolton and Leigh Railway opens to freight traffic.
- August 27 – The 67 km (42 mi) Andrézieux-Roanne line is authorized in France.

=== October events ===
- October 1 – The first public railway in France is formally opened from Saint-Étienne to Andrézieux. It is horse-worked and initially carries freight traffic only.

=== Unknown date events ===
- The Hudson and Berkshire Railroad is chartered to build a railroad between Chatham, New York, and Hudson, New York.

== Births ==
=== October births ===
- October 30 – Horatio G. Brooks, founder of Brooks Locomotive Works (d. 1887).
