= 1853 in rail transport =

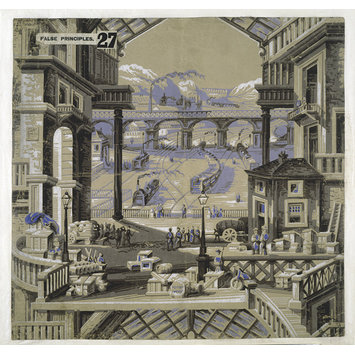

This article lists events related to rail transport that occurred in 1853.

== Events ==
=== January events ===
- January 25 – The Cincinnati, Cambridge and Chicago Short Line Railway, a predecessor of Pennsylvania Railroad, is incorporated in Indiana to build from New Castle southeast via Cambridge to the Ohio state line.
- January – The Memphis and Little Rock Railroad, the first railroad built in Arkansas is chartered.

=== February events ===
- February 5 – The Mississippi and Missouri Railroad, a predecessor of the Chicago, Rock Island and Pacific Railroad, is established in Iowa to build a railroad between Davenport and Council Bluffs.

=== April events ===
- April 2 – The New York Central Railroad is formed through the merger of ten smaller railroads in the New York area.
- April 16 – The first passenger train in India is inaugurated between Bori Bunder, Bombay (edge of site of modern-day Chhatrapati Shivaji Terminus, Mumbai), and Thana covering a distance of 34 km (21 mi).
- April 20 – Lord Dalhousie, Governor-General of India, resolves that trunk rail development in that country will be by private enterprise under close government supervision.

=== May events ===
- May 6 – The Norwalk rail accident is the first major US railroad bridge disaster, killing 48.
- May 17 – The New York Central Railroad is formed through the merger of ten smaller railroads in New York under the direction of Erastus Corning.

=== July events ===
- July 8 – The Northern Indiana Railroad is formed through the merger of several smaller railroads in Indiana and Ohio.
- July 18 – The Portland gauge Grand Trunk Railway is completed from Montreal to the ice-free seaport of Portland, Maine.

=== August events ===
- August 1 – The original Acton station (renamed in 1920 to Acton Central) near London, England, opens.
- August 19 – The Lake Erie, Wabash and St. Louis Railroad, a predecessor of the Wabash Railroad, is incorporated in Indiana.

=== September events ===
- September 20 – Indianapolis's Union Station, the first union station in the United States, opens.

=== October events ===
- October 1 – Bristol and Exeter Railway's Yeovil branch line is fully opened for passenger traffic.
- October 26 – Bristol and Exeter Railway's Yeovil branch line is fully opened for goods traffic.
- October – Homer Ramsdell succeeds Benjamin Loder as president of the Erie Railroad.

=== November events ===
- November 1 – Canada West Railroad opens its first division connecting Niagara Falls to Hamilton, Ontario.
- November 7 – The Arkansas Midland Railroad is created by an act of the Arkansas legislature.
- November 10 – Canada's Great Western Railway opens the line from Hamilton, Ontario, to the suspension bridge at Niagara Falls.

=== December events ===
- December 17 – The Brooklyn City Railroad, the oldest streetcar line in Brooklyn, New York, is incorporated.

=== Unknown date events ===
- The Monon Railroad opens its 300-mile (480 km) route between Chicago, Illinois, and Louisville, Kentucky
- American steam locomotive builder Manchester Locomotive Works opens.

== Births ==
=== April births ===
- April 25 – John Frank Stevens, chief engineer and general manager of Great Northern Railway, vice president Chicago, Rock Island and Pacific Railroad (d. 1943).

=== October births ===
- October 6 – Thomas George Shaughnessy, president of Canadian Pacific Railway Limited 1899–1918 (d. 1923).
- October 14 – John William Kendrick, chief engineer 1888–1893, general manager 1893–1899 and vice president 1899–1911 of Northern Pacific Railway and vice-chairman of the board for Atchison, Topeka and Santa Fe Railway (d. 1924).

== Deaths ==
=== July deaths ===
- July 24 – Hezekiah C. Seymour, chief engineer for Ontario, Huron and Lake Simcoe Railroad (b. 1811).

=== September deaths ===
- September 6 – George Bradshaw, English cartographer, printer and publisher and the originator of the railway timetable (b. 1800).
