= 1824 in rail transport =

This article lists events related to rail transport that occurred in 1824.

== Events ==
=== May events ===
- May 17 – The Monkland and Kirkintilloch Railway in Scotland is authorised; construction begins the following month.

=== October events ===
- October 29 - Liverpool and Manchester Railway Company, in England, issues its first prospectus.

=== December events ===
- December 31 - George Stephenson, his son Robert Stephenson, Edward Pease and Michael Longridge form George Stephenson and Company, a railway construction consultancy.

== Births ==
=== March births ===
- March 9 - Leland Stanford, a member of The Big Four group of financiers in California.

=== October births ===
- October 2 - Henry C. Lord, president of the Atchison, Topeka and Santa Fe Railway 1868–1869 (d. 1884).

=== November births ===
- November 14 – James Mitchell Ashley, founder and president of Ann Arbor Railroad, is born (d. 1896).

=== Unknown date births ===
- John Cooke, founder of American steam locomotive manufacturing company Cooke Locomotive Works (d. 1882).
