= 1859 in rail transport =

This article lists events related to rail transport that occurred in 1859.

== Events ==
=== February events ===
- February 11 — The Atchison and Topeka Railroad Company, forerunner of the Atchison, Topeka and Santa Fe Railway, is chartered in Kansas.
- February 13 — Hannibal and St. Joseph Railroad completes construction of its line across Missouri to connect its namesake cities.

=== March events ===
- March 3 — Construction begins on the first railway in northern India as tracks are laid between the present day locations of Allahabad and Kanpur.

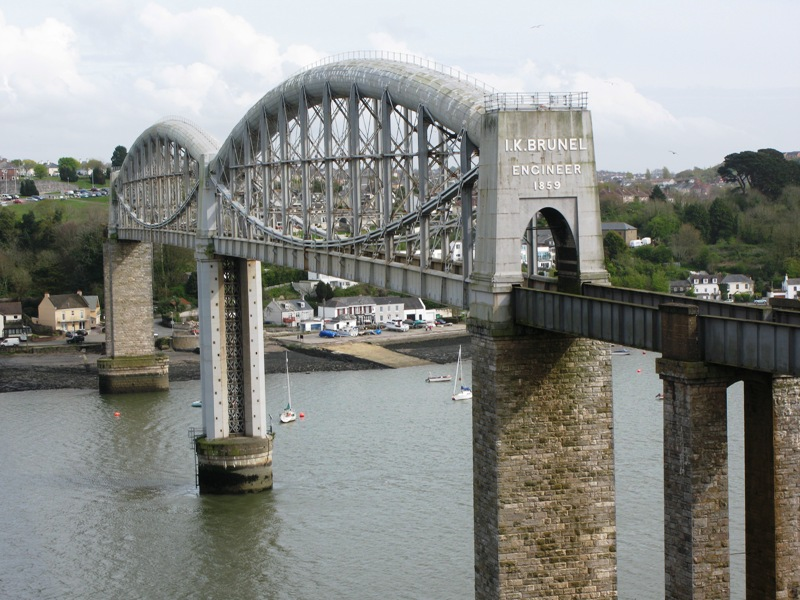
The Royal Albert Bridge, Brunel’s last work

- March 15 – While under lease to Bristol and Exeter Railway, the Somerset Central Railway is extended to Wells.

=== May events ===
- May 2 — Isambard Kingdom Brunel's Royal Albert Bridge at Saltash in Cornwall, England, opened by Prince Albert.
- May 4 — Cornwall Railway opened across the Royal Albert Bridge linking the counties of Devon and Cornwall in England.

=== June events ===
- June 2 — The organization that is to become the Chicago and North Western Railway purchases the assets of the bankrupt Chicago, St. Paul and Fond du Lac Railroad.
- June 7 — The Chicago and North Western Railway is chartered.
- June 11 — French law approves agreements concluded with railway companies; At the initiative of Charles, Duc de Morny, the concessions are divided into six large companies: Paris-Lyon-Méditerranée, Orléans, Midi, Est, Ouest and Nord.

=== August events ===
- August — Samuel Marsh succeeds Charles Moran as president of the Erie Railroad.

=== September events ===
- September 1 — The first Pullman sleeping car leaves Bloomington, Illinois, on an overnight trip to Chicago; first Pullman conductor is Jonathan L. Barnes.
- September 12 – At a meeting under Drammen chairmanship in Norway, construction of a railway line to connect Drammen and Randsfjorden, later known as the Randsfjorden Line, is selected over the option for a waterway.
- September 22 – The Chemins de fer de l'Est opens its line from Paris Gare de la Bastille to Vincennes and La Varenne in France.

=== October events ===
- October 3 — The Cologne-Minden Railway Company opens the Cathedral Bridge (Dombrücke) across the Rhine in Cologne giving access to the city's new Central Station.

=== December events ===
- December 27 — Grand Trunk Railway completes construction of the rail line from Toronto to Sarnia, Ontario, and begins a train ferry connection across the St. Clair River at Fort Gratiot.

=== Unknown date events ===
- Compañía de los Caminos de Hierro del Norte de España of Spain introduces its standard 0-6-0 goods locomotives, almost all of which will be in service for more than a century.

== Births ==
=== January births ===
- January 11 — Charles Bowen-Cooke, Chief Mechanical Engineer of the London and North Western Railway 1909–1920 (d. 1920).

=== April births ===
- April 3 – Darius Miller, president of Chicago, Burlington and Quincy Railroad 1910–1914 (d. 1914).
- April 11 — Stuart R. Knott, president of Kansas City Southern Railway 1900–1905 (d. 1943).

=== July births ===
- July 21 — Hugo Lentz, Austrian inventor of a valve gear for steam engines (d. 1944).

=== November births ===
- November 13 — Georg Knorr, German inventor of the Knorr brake (d. 1911).

=== December births ===
- December 3 — Vincent Raven, chief mechanical engineer of the North Eastern Railway (UK) from 1910 to 1922 (d. 1934).

== Deaths ==
=== September deaths ===
- September 15 — Isambard Kingdom Brunel, Englishh civil engineer of the Great Western Railway (b. 1806).

=== October deaths ===
- October 12 — Robert Stephenson, English railway civil engineer and steam locomotive builder (b. 1803).
