= 1814 in rail transport =

This article lists events related to rail transport that occurred in 1814.

== Events ==
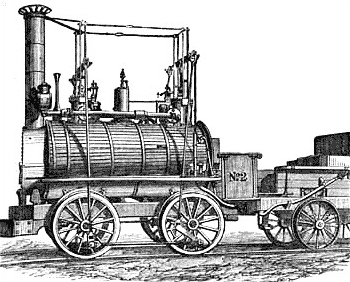
Stephenson's Blücher

=== July events ===
- July 25 – George Stephenson puts his first steam locomotive in service, the Blücher for Killingworth Colliery on Tyneside in England.

== Births ==
=== January births ===
- January 21 – Wendel Bollman, American designer of the Bollman Truss Railroad Bridge (d. 1884).
- January 30 – Ferdinand Schichau, German mechanical engineer and founder of locomotive manufacturing company Schichau-Werke, is born (d. 1896).

=== May births ===
- May 26 – Wilhelm Engerth, German steam locomotive designer (d. 1884).

=== September births ===
- September 11 – John Ramsbottom, superintendent of the Manchester and Birmingham Railway (d. 1897).

=== Unknown date births ===
- Andrew Barclay, Scottish steam locomotive builder (d. 1900).
