= 1806 in rail transport =

This article lists events related to rail transport that occurred in 1806.

== Births ==
=== April births ===
- April 9 – Isambard Kingdom Brunel, founder of Great Western Railway, is born (d. 1859).

=== December births ===
- December 19 – Benjamin Henry Latrobe, II, designer of Baltimore and Ohio Railroad's Thomas Viaduct (still in use today), is born (d. 1878).
