= 1825 in rail transport =

This article lists events related to rail transport that occurred in 1825.

== Events ==
=== April events ===
- April 19 – The La Plaisance Bay Harbor Company receives a charter to build a half-mile railroad in Monroe, Michigan, the first charter issued in the area that will become that state.

=== June events ===
- June 25 – The first passenger carrying monorail opens: The Cheshunt Railway in Cheshunt, Hertfordshire, England. Built to carry bricks, the line creates a sensation when spectators at the opening ceremonies hop in the cars for a ride.

=== September events ===
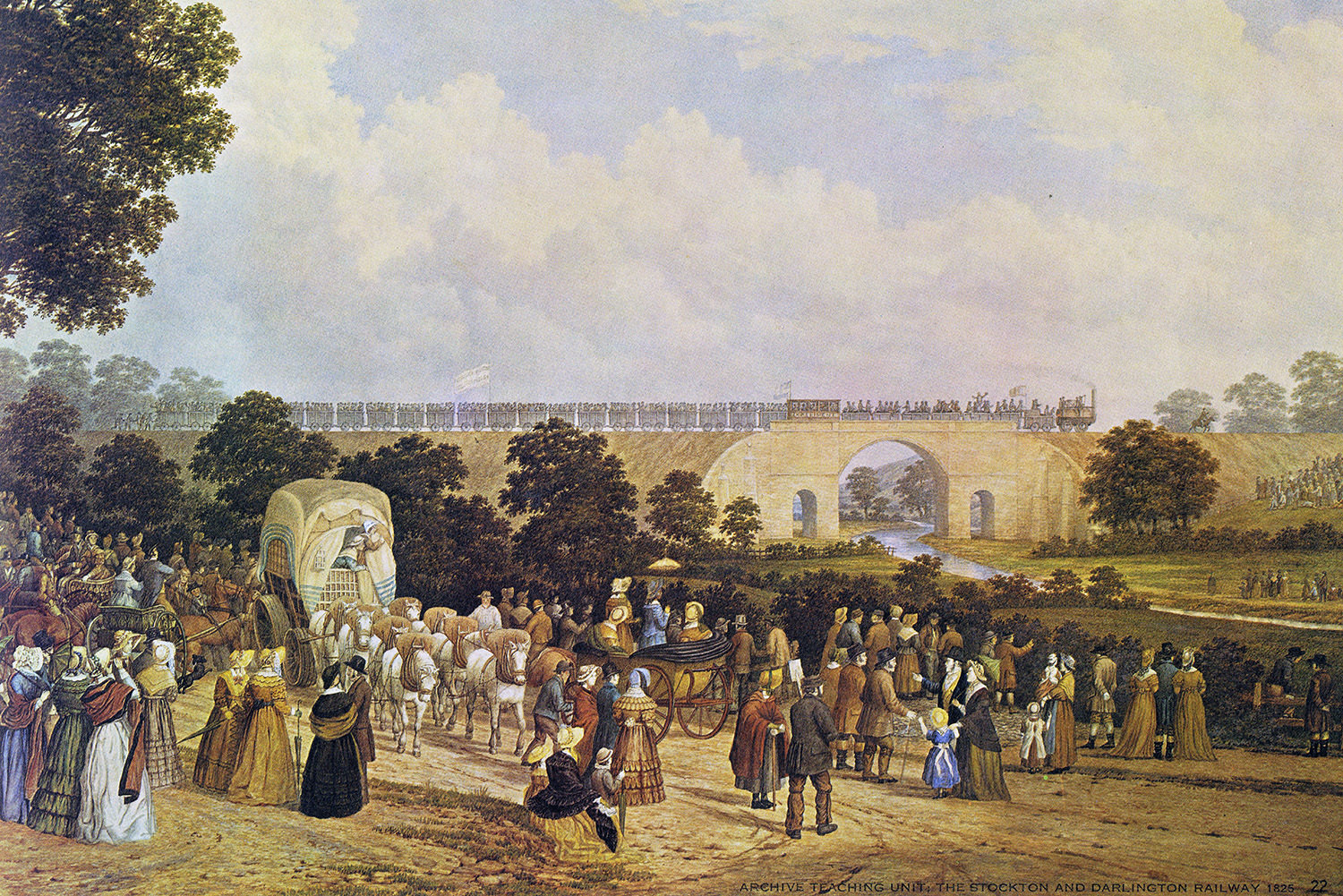
Opening of Stockton and Darlington Railway c1825, painted in the 1880s by John Dobbin

- September 27 – Official opening of the Stockton and Darlington Railway in the north of England, engineered by George Stephenson. Steam locomotives are intended solely for coal traffic but the inaugural train hauled by No. 1 Locomotion (the first locomotive built by Robert Stephenson and Company) carries up to 600 passengers. Most of these are carried in open wagons, but a purpose-built passenger coach, Experiment, carries 18 dignitaries, and becomes the first such vehicle to carry people on a railway.

=== December events ===
- December 28 – George William Featherstonhaugh, of Duanesburgh, New York, runs a newspaper notice announcing the formation of the Mohawk and Hudson Rail Road Company.

=== Unknown date events ===
- Matthias W. Baldwin opens his first machine shop in Philadelphia, Pennsylvania.
- John Stevens demonstrates a steam rack railway at his home in Hoboken, New Jersey.

== Births ==
- January 16 – Carl Abraham Pihl, Norwegian civil engineer and director of the Norwegian State Railways (NSB) 1865–1897, is born (d. 1897).
- July 19 – George H. Pendleton, president of Kentucky Central Railroad 1869–1879, is born (d. 1889).
