= 1873 in rail transport =

This article lists events related to rail transport that occurred in 1873.

== Events ==
=== January events ===
- January 21 – The New York, Boston and Montreal Railway is organized as a renaming of the New York, Boston and Northern Railway.
- January 29 – Chesapeake and Ohio Railway completes its line between Huntington, West Virginia, and Richmond, Virginia.

=== March events ===
- March 20 – The Staten Island Railway is reorganized through the purchase by George Law of the Staten Island Rail Road company.
- March – The first edition of the Cook's Continental Timetable is published; it remains in publication 153 years later.

=== April events ===
- April 2 – The first sleeping car is introduced in Britain, on Anglo-Scottish services.
- April 8 – Bombay, Baroda and Central India Railway reopens its Dabhoi-Miyagam line (32 km of 760 mm (2 ft 5 15/16 in) narrow gauge) relaid with stronger rails allowing locomotives to replace oxen as motive power (although this is not done regularly until 1880). Later part of the Gaekwar's Baroda State Railway and Western Railway, the Dabhoi system is in continuous operation until gauge conversion in the early 21st century.
- April 29 – Eli H. Janney is awarded U.S. patent 138,405, Improvement in Car-Couplings (filed for on April 1) for his knuckle coupler design.

=== May events ===
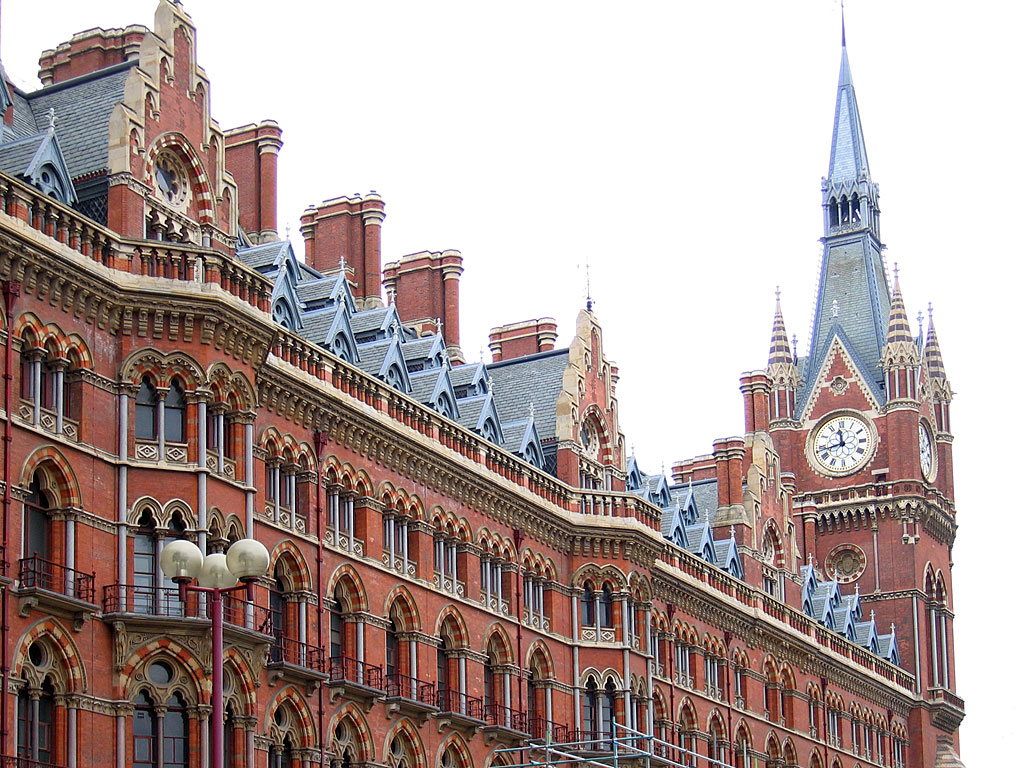
A high point of Victorian architecture: G. G. Scott’s Midland Grand Hotel fronting London St Pancras station

- May 5 – The Midland Railway of England opens the main part of the Midland Grand Hotel (designed by George Gilbert Scott) at its London St Pancras terminus.
- May 10 – The Atchison, Topeka and Santa Fe Railroad, building westward from Kansas, reaches Granada, Colorado.
- May 19 – Ballina railway station opens in Ireland.
- May 22 – Henry Strong succeeds Ginery Twichell as president of the Atchison, Topeka and Santa Fe Railway.

=== June events ===
- June – The Southern Pacific Railroad builds its first steam locomotive at the railroad's Sacramento, California, shops as CP's 2nd number 55, a 4-4-0.
- June 2 – Construction begins on Clay Street in San Francisco, California, for the first reliably-operated cable railway in the world, the Clay Street Hill Railroad (later to become part of the San Francisco cable car system).
- June 14 – The Denver, South Park and Pacific Railway is reorganized with greater capital as the Denver, South Park and Pacific Railroad.

=== July events ===
- July 1 – The Isle of Man Railway opens its first line, from Douglas to Peel.

=== August events ===
- August 2 – The first prototypes of the San Francisco cable car system are tested at the top of Nob Hill by Andrew Hallidie.
- August 3 – The Wigan rail crash in England kills 13 people.
- August 4
  - The Ross and Monmouth Railway's line from Monmouth, Wales, to Ross on Wye, England, opens.
  - American Indian Wars: While protecting a railroad survey party in Montana, the Seventh Cavalry, under Lieutenant Colonel George Armstrong Custer, clashes for the first time with the Sioux, near the Tongue River (only 1 man on each side is killed).

=== September events ===
- September 15 – Freight services at Shimbashi Station in Tokyo, Japan, are introduced.
- September 20 – In order to contain the Panic of 1873, brought on by the failure two days earlier of Jay Cooke & Company in financing the Northern Pacific Railway, the New York Stock Exchange halts all trading and closes for ten days.
- September 22 – Western Counties Railway holds official groundbreaking ceremonies at Lovitt's Wharf, Yarmouth County, Nova Scotia, Canada.

=== October events ===
- October 3 – Grand Trunk Railway begins converting its track between Stratford, Ontario, and Montreal from 5 ft 6 in (1,676 mm) (broad gauge) to 1,435 mm (4 ft 8 1/2 in) (standard gauge); the conversion is completed within 24 hours.
- October 8 – Hanko–Hyvinkää railway opens in Finland.

=== November events ===
- November 1 – Devon and Somerset Railway opens its complete line from Watchet Junction to Barnstaple.

=== December events ===
- December 23 – The first section of the Atchison, Topeka and Santa Fe Railroad is opened between Topeka, Kansas, and the Colorado/Kansas border.
- December 24 – Opening of first steam-operated passenger railway in the North Island of New Zealand, from Auckland to Onehunga (1,067 mm (3 ft 6 in) gauge).

=== Unknown date events ===
- Under the direction of Cornelius Vanderbilt, the New York Central and Hudson River Railroad tracks reach Chicago, Illinois.
- St. Charles Car Company, later to become part of American Car and Foundry, is founded in St. Charles, Missouri.
- In Mexico, the Veracruz–Mexico City railroad is completed.
- Matthew Baird retires from his management and ownership position at Baldwin Locomotive Works.

== Deaths ==
=== December deaths ===
- December 24 – Johns Hopkins, entrepreneur (b. 1795), died without heirs, leaving $7 million, mostly in Baltimore and Ohio Railroad stock, to establish his namesake institutions, the single largest philanthropic donation ever made to educational institutions at that time.
