= 1840 in rail transport =

This article lists events related to rail transport that occurred in 1840.

== Events ==
=== March events ===
- 9 March – The Wilmington and Raleigh Railroad is completed from Wilmington to Weldon, North Carolina. At 161.5 miles (260 km), it is the world's longest railroad at this time.

=== April events ===
- April – The Raleigh and Gaston Railroad is completed from Raleigh to near Weldon, North Carolina.

=== May events ===
- 11 May – The London and South Western Railway opens its original main line throughout to Southampton (England).

=== July events ===
- 1 July - The Midland Counties Railway of England opens its line from Derby and Nottingham via Leicester to a junction with the London and Birmingham Railway at Rugby.

=== August events ===
- 12 August – The Glasgow, Paisley, Kilmarnock and Ayr Railway opened between Glasgow Bridge Street railway station and Ayr, the first inter-urban railroad in Scotland.
- 17 August – The first railroad built in Milan, Italy, the Milan and Monza Rail Road opens for service.

=== October events ===
- 8 October – Formal opening of first section of the Taff Vale Railway, the first steam-worked passenger railway in Wales, from Cardiff Docks to Navigation House (Abercynon). Public service begins the following day.

=== December events ===
- 21 December – Manchester and Birmingham Railway in England completes Stockport Viaduct (but does not yet bring it into use). It is one of the largest brick structures in Europe.

=== Unknown date events ===
- By July – August Borsig completes the first steam locomotive built in Germany.
- Mordecai W. Jackson and George Mack partner to create a farm implement manufacturing company that will eventually become Jackson and Woodin Manufacturing Company, one of the constituent companies of American Car and Foundry Company.

== Births ==
=== January births ===
- January 8 – William Dean, Chief Mechanical Engineer of Great Western Railway of England 1877–1902 (d. 1905).
- January 29 – Henry H. Rogers, American financier who helped finance and build the Virginian Railway (d. 1909).

=== February births ===
- February 7 – Samuel W. Fordyce, president of St. Louis, Arkansas and Texas Railway 1886–1889, St. Louis Southwestern Railway 1890–1898, Kansas City Southern Railway 1900 (d. 1919).

=== March births ===
- March 31 – Benjamin Baker, British civil engineer, designer of the Forth Railway Bridge (d. 1907).

=== April births ===
- April – William Sykes, English railway signalling engineer (d. 1917).

=== June births ===
- June 6 – William Dudley Chipley, president of the Baltimore and Ohio Railroad 1873–1876 (d. 1897).
- June 14 – William F. Nast, president of the Atchison, Topeka and Santa Fe Railway September 1868.
- June 27 – Alpheus Beede Stickney, first president of Chicago Great Western Railway 1884–1909 (d. 1916).

=== August births ===
- August 23 – Brayton Ives, president of Northern Pacific Railway 1893–1896 (d. 1914).
- August 25 – George C. Magoun, Chairman of the Board of Directors for Atchison, Topeka and Santa Fe Railway in the late 1880s (d. 1893).

=== November births ===
- November 17 – Edmund Morel, English-born civil engineer in Japan (d. 1871).
- November 24 – Henry Kirke Porter, American steam locomotive builder and founder of H. K. Porter, Inc (d. 1921).

== Deaths ==
=== April deaths ===
- April 12 – Franz Anton von Gerstner, Bohemian-born railway civil engineer (b. 1796)
