= 1885 in rail transport =

This article lists events related to rail transport that occurred in 1885.

== Events ==
=== February events ===
- February 8 – The Midland Railway of England opens its extension to Birmingham New Street station.
- February 12 – The Kansas City, Clinton and Springfield Railway is incorporated in Missouri.
- February 17 – The Southern Pacific Railroad and Central Pacific Railroad are combined under a single holding company, the Southern Pacific Company.

=== April events ===
- April 1 – The Southern Pacific Railroad takes over operations of the Central Pacific Railroad.
- April 6 – The Meriden and Cromwell Railroad, a Connecticut predecessor of the New York, New Haven & Hartford Railroad, opens.

=== June events ===
- June – John J. Hagerman gains control of Colorado Midland.

=== July events ===
- July 19 – The Zanesville and Ohio River Railway enters receivership.
- July 20
  - The Hull & Barnsley Railway opens in Yorkshire, England. It is intended to challenge the near-monopoly on export coal traffic in its region of the North Eastern Railway.
  - Opening of first railway in Vietnam, Saigon to Mỹ Tho.

=== August events ===
- August – International Railway Congress Association established in Brussels to provide an international forum for technical discussion.

=== November events ===
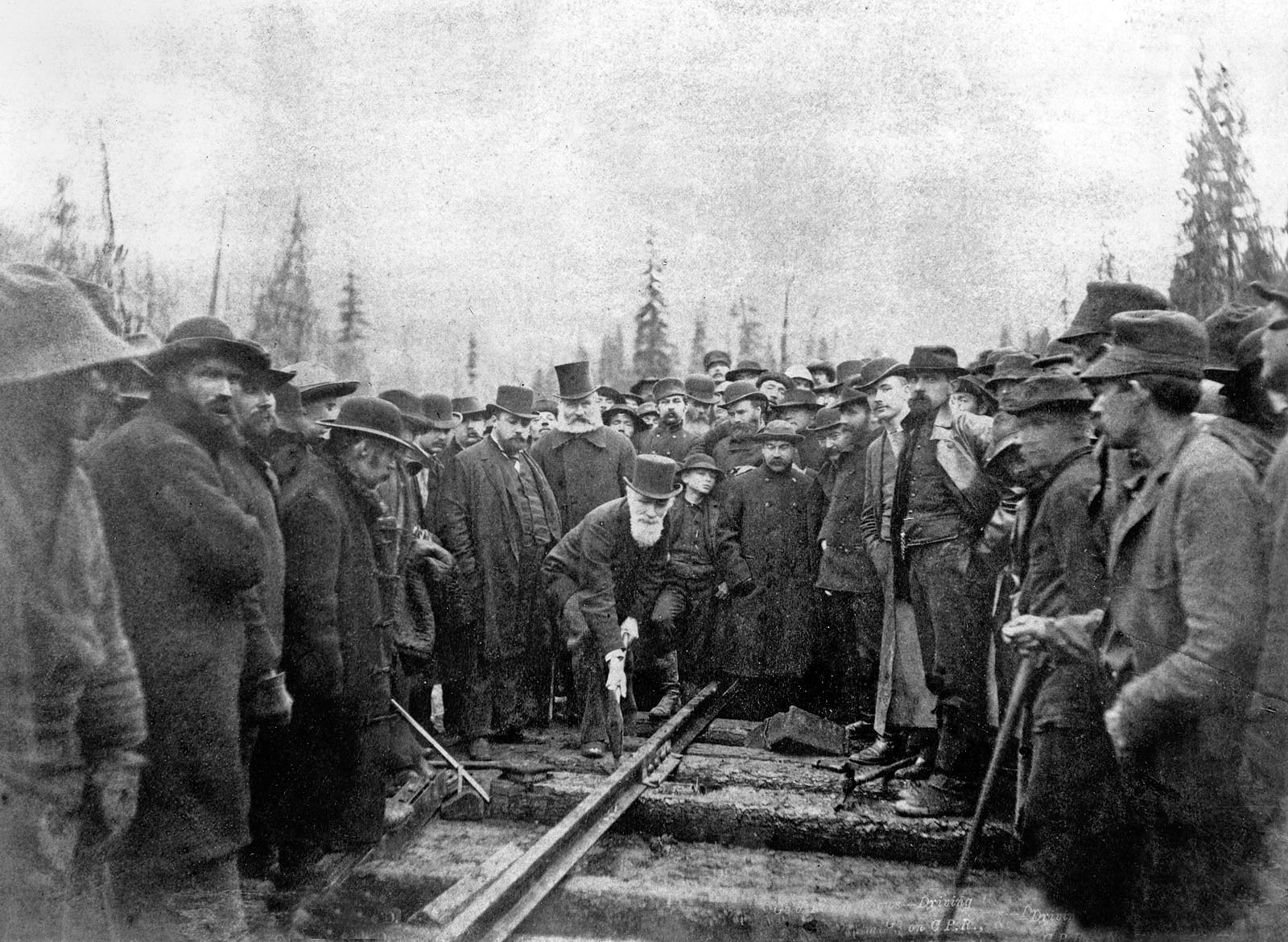
The last spike is driven on the Canadian Pacific Railway

- November – First train crosses Garabit viaduct in the Massif Central of France.
- November 6 – Phase 3 of the Novara–Varallo railway in Italy opens connecting Grignasco to Borgosesia.
- November 7 – The last spike on the Canadian Pacific Railway is driven at Craigellachie, British Columbia, Canada.
- November 9 – The last spike is driven on the California Southern Railroad between Barstow and San Bernardino through Cajon Pass, completing the connection to the Atlantic and Pacific Railroad.
- November 12 – The first train to travel the entire route of California Southern Railroad's track through Cajon Pass carries rails from Barstow to Riverside.
- November 17 – The first through train from Chicago via Santa Fe lines arrives in San Diego.
- November 29 – The Atchison, Topeka and Santa Fe Railway leases trackage rights over the Southern Pacific Railroad from San Bernardino to Los Angeles at $1,200 per mile per year.

=== Unknown date events ===
- Cornelius Vanderbilt II is promoted to president of the New York Central system.
- The New Zealand Government Railways become the first major railway to place a 2-6-2 steam locomotive into service, having ordered ten V class from Nasmyth, Wilson & Company of Manchester, England.

== Births ==
=== Unknown date births ===
- Richard M. Dilworth, General Motors Electro-Motive Division chief engineer credited with developing the diesel-electric locomotive concept in the 1930s (d. 1968).

== Deaths ==
=== January deaths ===
- January 12 – John B. Jervis, Chief mechanical engineer of the Mohawk & Hudson Railroad, pioneer of the use of the leading truck on steam locomotives (b. 1795).

=== July deaths ===
- July 31 – Robert F. Fairlie, Scottish steam locomotive builder (b. 1831).

=== December deaths ===
- December 6 – Robert Gerwig, German civil engineer, designer of the Schwarzwaldbahn and the Höllentalbahn in the Black Forest (b. 1820).
- December 8 – William Henry Vanderbilt, son of Cornelius Vanderbilt and president of the New York Central system (b. 1821).
