= 1805 in rail transport =

This article lists events related to rail transport that occurred in 1805.

== Births ==
=== June births ===
- June 15 – William Butler Ogden, president of the Chicago and North Western Railway (d. 1877).

=== August births ===
- August 9 – Joseph Locke, English civil engineer who became Chief Engineer on the Grand Junction Railway (d. 1860).

=== November births ===
- November 7 – Thomas Brassey, English railway contractor who supervised the construction of more than 6500 miles (10461 km) of track around the world (d. 1870).

=== Unknown date births ===
- George S. Griggs, pioneering master mechanic in American steam locomotive manufacturing (d. 1870).
- William Swinburne, American locomotive designer and builder (d. 1883).
