= 1802 in rail transport =

This article lists events related to rail transport that occurred in 1802.

== Events ==
=== March events ===
- March 24 – Andrew Vivian and Richard Trevithick of Cornwall, England, are granted the first British patent for a steam engine for propelling carriages and other purposes.

=== June events ===
- June 3 – Carmarthenshire Railway or Tramroad authorised under Act of Parliament, the first granted for a public railway in Wales. Its acquisition of the Carmarthenshire Dock at Llanelly also makes it the world’s first dock-owning public railway company.

=== September events ===
- September 21 – First traffic passes over the Surrey Iron Railway in England.

== Births ==
=== January births ===
- January 10 – Carl Ritter von Ghega, Austrian civil engineer, builder of the Semmering railway (d. 1860).

=== February births ===
- February 2 – Moncure Robinson, builder of the Chesterfield Railroad (d. 1891).

=== July births ===
- July 2 – William Norris, American steam locomotive builder and founder of Norris Locomotive Works (d. 1867).
