= 1812 in rail transport =

This article lists events related to rail transport that occurred in 1812.

== Events ==
=== July events ===
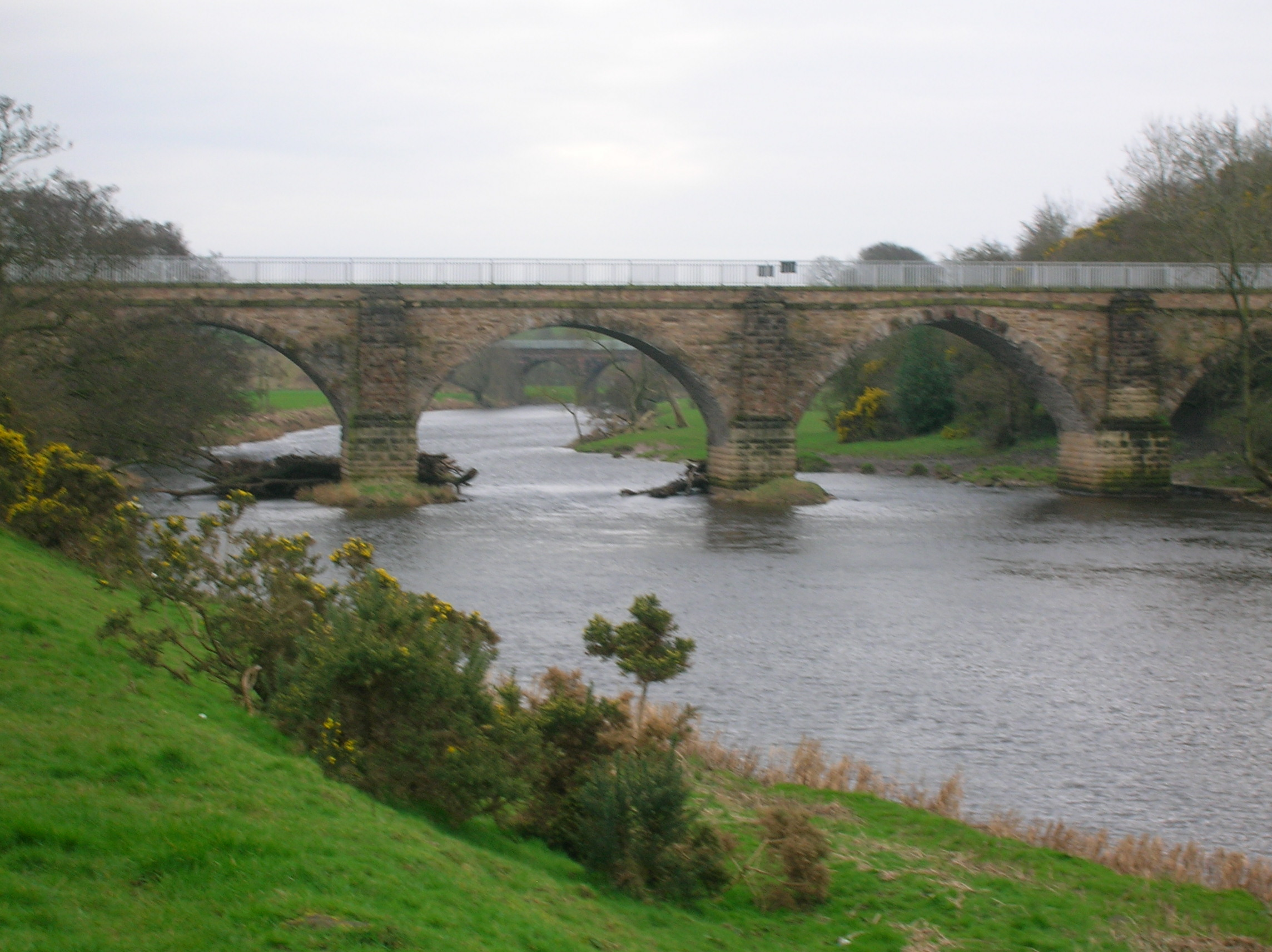
Laigh Milton Viaduct, Kilmarnock and Troon Railway

- July 6 – The Kilmarnock and Troon Railway becomes the first public railway line to open in Scotland. It begins life as a 9.5-mile (16-kilometre), double track 4 ft (1,219 mm) gauge, horse-drawn waggonway to carry coal from Kilmarnock to Troon harbour; the engineer was William Jessop. On 27 June the horse-drawn passenger coach Caledonia began running over the line between Troon and Gargieston, near Kilmarnock.

=== August events ===
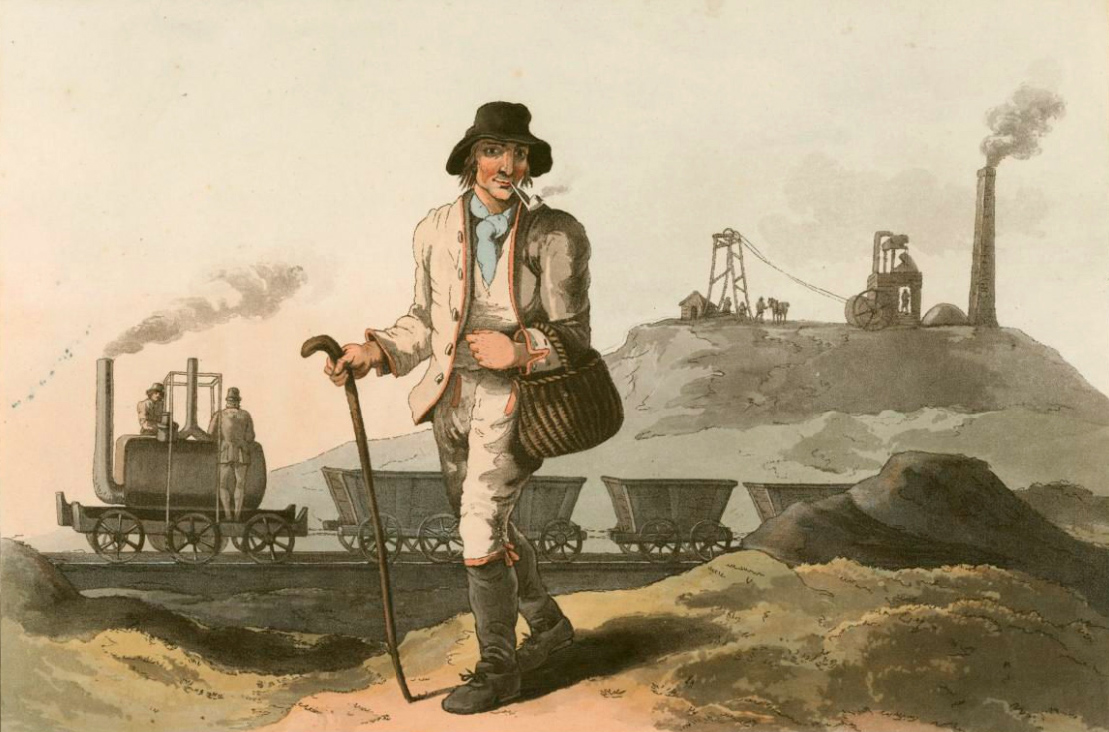
Steam locomotive on Middleton Railway

- August 12 – The Middleton Railway, serving coal pits at Leeds in England, becomes the first to use steam locomotives successfully in regular service. The first locomotive, Salamanca, is also the first to use two cylinders and has a rack railway mechanism devised by John Blenkinsop and built by Matthew Murray.

== Births ==
=== March births ===
- March 20 – Charles Vincent Walker, English railway telegraph engineer (d. 1882).

=== May births ===
- May 10 – William Henry Barlow, English railway civil engineer (d. 1902).

=== August births ===
- August 15 – William Kimmel, director for Baltimore and Ohio Railroad (d. 1886).

=== December births ===
- December 12 – James Grant, first president of Chicago, Rock Island and Pacific Railroad, 1851–1854 (d. 1891).
- December 23 – Samuel Smiles, British engineering biographer and railway manager (d. 1904).

=== Unknown date births ===
- William F. Harnden, the first person to send an express shipment by rail (d. 1845).
