= 1800 in rail transport =

This article lists events related to rail transport that occurred in 1800.

== Events ==
- Legbrannock Waggonway opened by William Dixon (senior) to move coal from Legbrannock colliery on the Woodhall Estate to the Monkland Canal at Calderbank, an early example of a railway in Scotland.

== Births ==
=== March births ===
- March 10 – George Hudson, English railway financier, "The Railway King" (d. 1871).

=== July births ===
- July 15 – Sidney Breese, U.S. senator from Illinois known as the "father of the Illinois Central Railroad" (d. 1878).
- July 29 – George Bradshaw, English cartographer, printer and publisher and the originator of the railway timetable (d. 1853).
