= 1811 in rail transport =

This article lists events related to rail transport that occurred in 1811.

== Births ==
=== February births ===
- February 20 – Thomas Kirtley, locomotive superintendent of North Midland Railway 1843–1844, and London, Brighton and South Coast Railway in 1847 (d. 1847).

=== June births ===
- June 24 – Hezekiah C. Seymour, chief engineer for Ontario, Huron and Lake Simcoe Railroad (d. 1853).

=== August births ===
- August – Ginery Twichell, president of the Boston and Worcester Railroad beginning in 1857, president of the Atchison, Topeka and Santa Fe Railway 1870–1873 (d. 1883) (Congress Bioguide gives August 26; Waters gives August 22).

=== November births ===
- November 13 – Robert B. Dockray, civil engineer on the London and Birmingham Railway in England (d. 1871).
