= 1860 in rail transport =

This article lists events related to rail transport that occurred in 1860.

== Events ==
=== February events ===
- February 1 – Stockholders and officials take an inaugural ride on the first Staten Island Railway line between Vanderbilt's Landing and Eltingville.;

=== April events ===
- April 23 – The Staten Island Railway starts operations in Staten Island, New York; this is now the oldest rapid transit right-of-way in New York City, but is operated separately from the New York City Subway.

=== May events ===
- May 7 – The Bavarian State Railway opens connecting Rosenheim, Prien and Traunstein.
- May 14 – The Staten Island Railway is extended to Annadale.
- May 15 – New Brunswick issues the first postage stamps to depict a locomotive.

=== June events ===
- June 2 – The Staten Island Railway is extended to Tottenville.
- June 26 – Opening of first railway in Southern Africa, the Natal Railway from Durban to The Point in the Colony of Natal (3 km (1.9 mi) of standard gauge).

=== July events ===
- July 2 – Cessation of operation as an atmospheric railway of the Bois de Vésinet–Saint-Germain-en-Laye section of the Paris–Saint-Germain line, the last surviving atmospheric working.
- July 19 – The London and South Western Railway extension to Exeter opens.

=== August events ===
- August 17 – The Oil Creek Railroad is chartered by railroad investor Thomas Struthers of Warren, Pennsylvania, and several other Warren businessmen.
- August 25 – The Prince of Wales, who later became Edward VII, presides over the opening ceremonies for the Victoria Railway Bridge near Montreal, Province of Canada.
- August 30 – The predecessor to Birkenhead Corporation Tramways opens the first street-running horsecar town tramway in Europe.

=== September events ===
- September 17 – The Atchison and Topeka Railroad, chartered on February 11, 1859, and predecessor to the Atchison, Topeka and Santa Fe Railway, is organized.

=== October events ===
- October 23 (approx.) – Installation of the first water troughs for steam locomotives to pick up water at speed, by the London and North Western Railway at Mochdre, Conwy, on its North Wales Coast (or Chester and Holyhead) line.
- October 26 – The Bergisch-Märkische Eisenbahn in Germany opens between Bochum Hauptbahnhof and Witten.

=== November events ===
- November 16 – The Atherstone rail accident in England kills 10 Irish cattle drovers.

=== Unknown date events ===
- The first 2-6-0s with leading trucks are built by the Baldwin Locomotive Works for the Louisville and Nashville Railroad.
- Kingston Locomotive Works, predecessor of the Canadian Locomotive Company, declares bankruptcy.

== Births ==
=== January births ===
- January 3 – Henry Clay Hall, commissioner for Interstate Commerce Commission beginning in 1914, chairman of same 1917–1928 (died 1936).

=== December births ===
- December 6 – Howard Elliott, president of Northern Pacific Railway 1903–1913 and New Haven Railroad beginning in 1913 (died 1928)

== Deaths ==
=== March deaths ===
- March 14 – Carl Ritter von Ghega, Austrian civil engineer, builder of the Semmering railway (born 1802).

=== September deaths ===
- September 18 – Joseph Locke, construction engineer of Stockton and Darlington Railway and Liverpool and Manchester Railway, chief engineer of Grand Junction Railway (born 1805).
