= 1952 in rail transport =

This article lists events related to rail transport that occurred in 1952.

== Events ==
=== January events ===
- January 13 – Union Pacific Railroad’s City of San Francisco is stalled in snow on Donner Pass. The train's passengers remain stranded in the train until January 16.

=== March events ===
- March 25 – The Seibu Shinjuku Line extension from Takadanobaba to Seibu-Shinjuku Station opens.

=== April events ===
- April 14 – Indian Railways divisional organisation completed by formation of the Eastern Railway, created by amalgamating three lower divisions of the East Indian Railway (Howrah, Asansol and Danapur), the entire Bengal Nagpur Railway and the Sealdah division of the erstwhile Bengal Assam Railway; the Northern Railway, created from remaining divisions of the EIR, the Eastern Punjab Railway and others; and the North Eastern Railway created by merger of the Oudh and Tirhut Railway and the Assam Railway.

=== May events ===
- May 3 – Wallace station on the Chicago "L" Stock Yards branch is closed.
- May 4 – Service is discontinued on the Chicago "L" Humboldt Park branch.

=== July events ===
- July 6 – The last tram (streetcar) runs in London, England.
- July 21 – The 7.3 M_{w} Kern County earthquake strikes Southern California with a maximum Mercalli intensity of XI (Extreme), killing 12 and injuring hundreds. Southeast of Bealville 46 cm (18 in) thick reinforced concrete railroad tunnel walls are cracked, tracks warped, and the gap between tunnel entrances is reduced by up to 2.5 meters (8 ft 2 in).

=== August events ===
- August 2 – The Buffalo-Exchange Street Station opens.

=== September events ===
- September 6 – The Chesapeake and Ohio Railway car ferry Badger is launched. It is the last coal-fired, passenger-carrying steamship built in the United States, and it is still in use for automobile travel.

=== October events ===
- October 4 – Brussels-Congress railway station is opened.
- October 8 – Three trains are involved in the Harrow and Wealdstone rail crash in England, a crash that kills 112 and injures 340.
- October 17 – British Railways initiates trial of a new Automatic Warning System (Automatic Train Control).

=== November events ===
- November 1 – The Pacific Great Eastern Railway opens its branch from Quesnel, British Columbia, to a nearby junction with the Canadian National Railway.
- November 20 – Brush Bagnall (England) formally hand over first of batch of class M1 A1A-A1A diesel-electric locomotives for Ceylon Government Railway, its first mainline diesels.

=== December events ===
- December 1 – Canadian Pacific Railway ushers in the modern intermodal freight transport era with the introduction of Trailer On Flat Car service.
- December 28 – Pacific Electric discontinues interurban service over the Cahuenga Pass between Los Angeles and Van Nuys, California.

=== Unknown date events ===
- The "Chinese Changchun Railway", that portion of the Chinese Eastern Railway on the Liaodong Peninsula, is returned by the Soviet Union to Chinese control.
- National Railway Company of Belgium opens new Brussels-North railway station.
- Last standard gauge compound locomotives built: Norfolk and Western Railway 2-8-8-2 Class Y6b Mallet #2200 from its Roanoke Shops, the last conventional steam freight locomotive for road service constructed in the United States; and SNCF Class 241P mixed-traffic 4-cylinder Chapelon 4-8-2 #241P-35 at Le Creusot in France.
- Donald J. Russell takes over as president of the Southern Pacific Company, parent company of the Southern Pacific Railroad.

== Births ==
- September 19 – George Warrington, president of Amtrak 1998–2002, executive director of New Jersey Transit 2002–2007 (d. 2007).

== Deaths ==
- November 19 – Yury Lomonosov, Russian-born locomotive engineer (b. 1876).
