= 1949 in rail transport =

This article lists events related to rail transport that occurred in 1949.

== Events ==
=== January events ===
- January 22 - The American Freedom Train tour, carrying the original versions of the United States Constitution, Declaration of Independence and the Bill of Rights, officially ends in Washington, DC. See also American Freedom Train - 1947-1949 station stops.

=== February events ===
- February - General Motors Electro-Motive Division introduces the EMD F7.

=== March events ===
- March 19 - The Chicago, Burlington and Quincy Railroad, Denver and Rio Grande Western Railroad and Western Pacific Railroad jointly launch the California Zephyr between Chicago, Illinois, and San Francisco, California, as the first train to include Vista Dome cars in regular service.
- March 20 - The first eastbound California Zephyr departs San Francisco at 9:20 AM, bound for Chicago.

=== April events ===
- April 24 - Rail service on the San Diego Electric Railway comes to an end at 5:45 AM as Car number 446 pulls into the Adams Avenue car barn, making San Diego the first major Southwestern United States city to eliminate streetcars and convert to an all-bus transit system.

=== May events ===
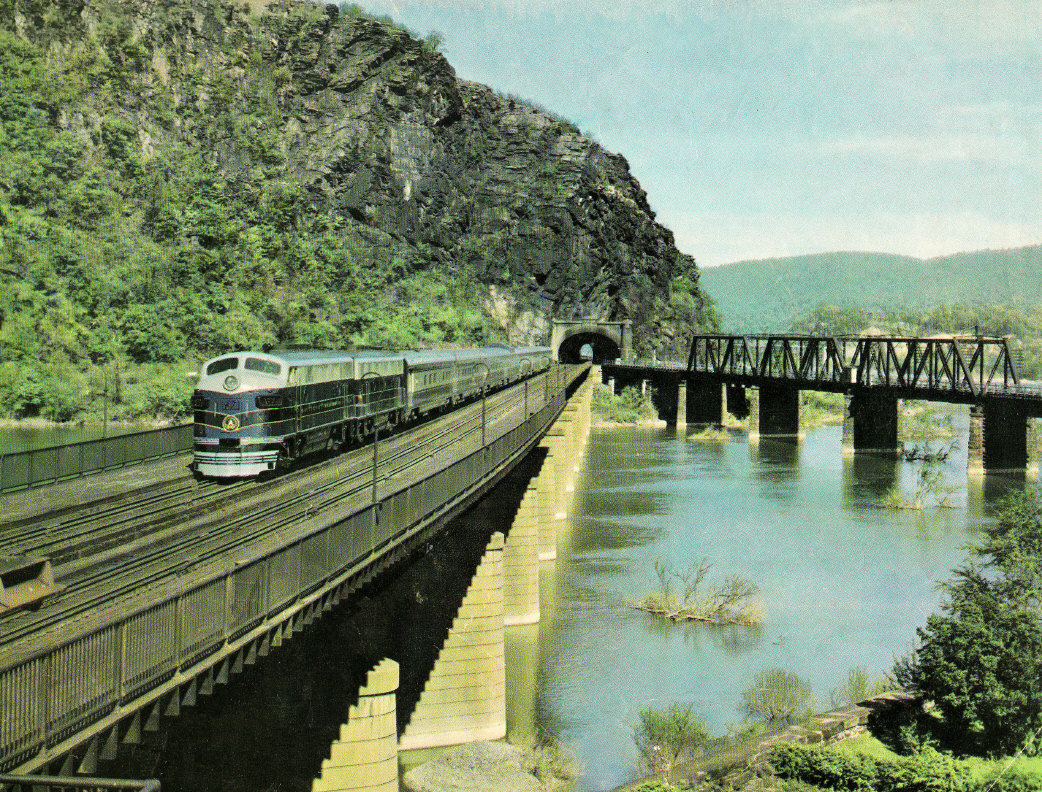
B&O’s new Columbian streamlined trainset at Harpers Ferry, West Virginia, in 1949

- May 5 – Baltimore and Ohio Railroad introduces new lightweight streamlined Pullman-Standard consists for its Columbian passenger service between Baltimore, Washington and Chicago. The two eight-car trains will be the only all-new consists built for the B&O in the postwar period and the first trains in the eastern U.S. to be equipped with dome cars.
- May 13 - Lima Locomotive Works ships Nickel Plate Road 2-8-4 #779, Lima's last steam locomotive.

=== June events ===
- June - General Motors Electro-Motive Division introduces the EMD FP7.
- June 1 - Japanese National Railways is organized.
- June 29 - The final day of steam locomotive service on the Monon Railroad as the Monon becomes one of the first Class I railroads in America to fully convert to diesel motive power.

=== August events ===
- August - General Motors Electro-Motive Division introduces the EMD E8.
- August 1 - Gaekwar's Baroda State Railway absorbed by Bombay, Baroda and Central India Railway.

=== September events ===
- September 7 - Deutsche Bundesbahn in Germany is formed as a successor of the Deutsche Reichsbahn-Gesellschaft.
- September 19 - the Budd Company unveils its first Rail Diesel Car (RDC) at Union Station in Chicago, Illinois.

=== October events ===
- October 7 - Gulf, Mobile and Ohio Railroad converts completely to diesel locomotive power.
- October - General Motors Electro-Motive Division introduces the EMD GP7.
- October - Paul W. Johnston succeeds Robert E. Woodruff as president of the Erie Railroad.
- October - Interfrigo set up to manage stock of refrigerated vans on European railways.

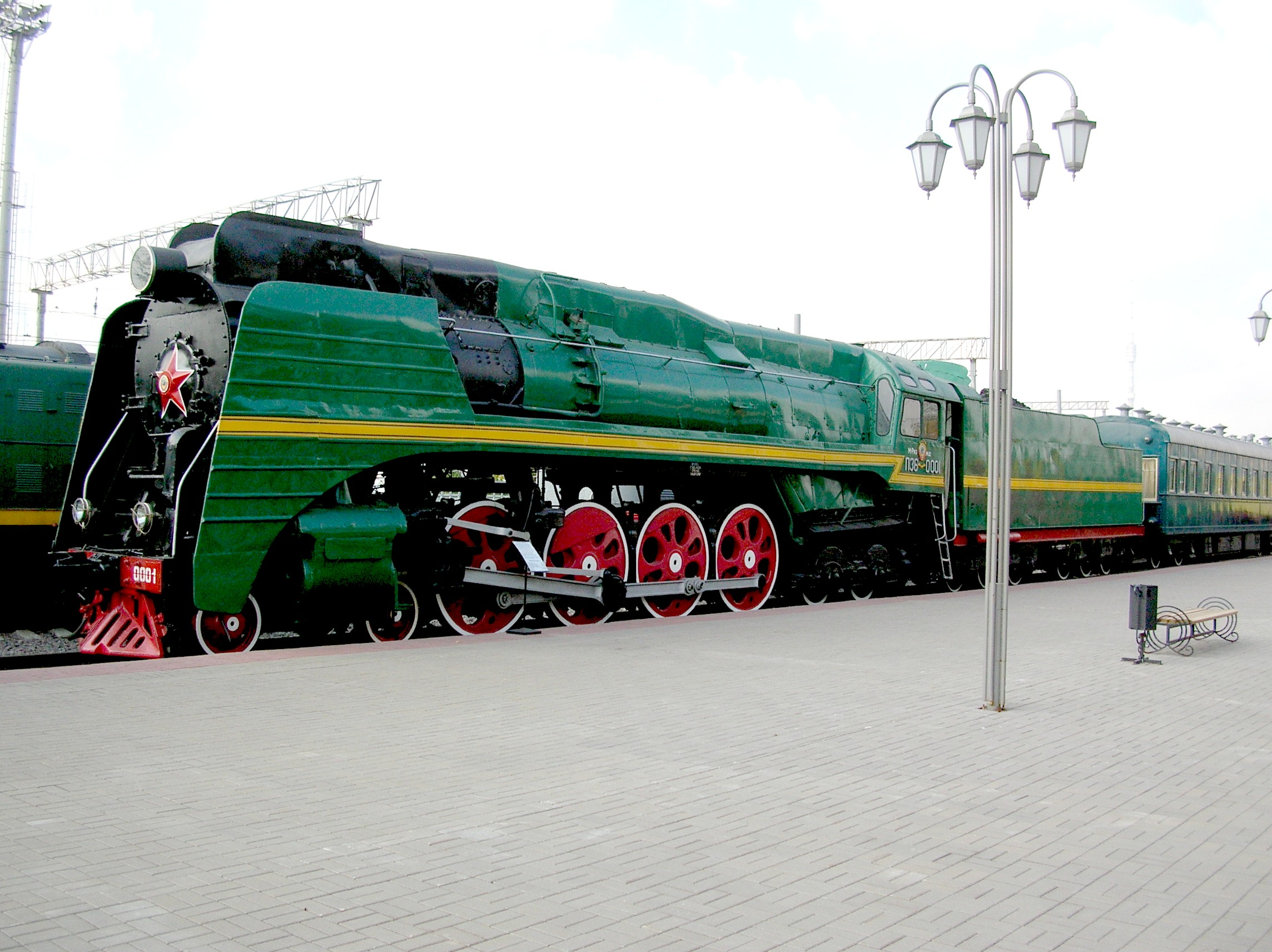
SZD П36-001

=== Unknown date events ===
- Budd Rail Diesel Car introduced.
- First of final steam locomotive class to be built for Soviet Railways, express passenger class P36 4-8-4 П36-001, is turned out of Kolomna Locomotive Works. There will be 251 examples, the most of this wheel arrangement outside the United States.
- Summer - Construction starts on the ill-fated Salekhard-Igarka Railway in Siberian Arctic.

== Births ==
=== January births ===
- January 19 - David Laney, Chairman of the Board of Directors for Amtrak 2003–2007.

== Deaths ==
=== March deaths ===
- March 31 - Grant Stauffer, president of Chicago Great Western Railway 1948–1949, dies.

=== May deaths ===
- May - Nathaniel Lamson Howard, president of Chicago Great Western Railway 1925-1929 (born 1887).
