= 1827 in rail transport =

This article lists events related to rail transport that occurred in 1827.

== Events ==
=== February events ===
- February 28 – The Baltimore and Ohio Rail Road is incorporated.

=== May events ===
- May 5 – Mauch Chunk Switchback Railway opened by the Lehigh Coal & Navigation Company in the United States.

=== June events ===
- June 30 - the Saint-Étienne to Andrézieux Railway, the first railway line in France and continental Europe begins to operate.

=== September events ===
- September 7 – Opening of the first railway in Austria-Hungary, a horse-worked line from České Budějovice to Trojanov (in the present-day Czech Republic).

=== December events ===
- December 19 – The South Carolina Canal and Rail Road is chartered.

=== Unknown date events ===
- Claudius Crozet completes surveying a route for the first railroad to be built in Virginia, the Chesterfield Railroad.
- John B. Jervis becomes the chief engineer for the Delaware and Hudson Canal Company, the forerunner of the Delaware and Hudson Railroad.

== Births ==
=== April births ===
- April 1 – Thomas Seavey Hall, American inventor of railroad signalling systems (d. 1880).

=== July births ===
- July 11 – Austin Corbin, president of Long Island Rail Road (d. 1896).

=== September births ===
- September 27 – Aaron Augustus Sargent, American journalist, lawyer and politician; authored the first Pacific Railroad Act (d. 1887).

=== October births ===
- October 27 – Albert Fink, German-born American civil engineer and railroad manager (d. 1897).
