= 1819 in rail transport =

This article lists events related to rail transport that occurred in 1819.

== Events ==
=== April events ===
- April 13 – The Mansfield and Pinxton Railway, a wagonway in the midlands of England, opens for coal traffic.

=== June events ===
- June 24 – James Foster and John Urpeth Rastrick partner to form Foster, Rastrick and Company, the English firm that will build the first steam locomotives for the Delaware and Hudson Railroad.

== Births ==
=== February births ===
- February 20 – Alfred Escher, Swiss railway promoter (d. 1882)

=== October births ===
- October 27 – Henry B. Plant, president of the Plant System of railroads (d. 1899).

== Deaths ==
=== April deaths ===
- April 15 – Oliver Evans, pioneering American steam locomotive designer and inventor (b. 1755).
