= 1803 in rail transport =

This article lists events related to rail transport that occurred in 1803.

== Events ==
=== May events ===
- May – First section of Carmarthenshire Railway opens, the first public railway in Wales.

=== July events ===
- July 26 – The Surrey Iron Railway formally opens throughout, first public railway in England.

== Births ==
=== June births ===
- June 10 – Anson P. Morrill, president of Maine Central Railroad 1864–1866 and 1873–1875 (d. 1887).

=== October births ===
- October 16 – Robert Stephenson, English civil engineer and steam locomotive builder.

=== November births ===
- November 9 – Henry Farnam, president of the Chicago, Rock Island and Pacific Railroad 1854–1863 (d. 1883).
