= 1809 in rail transport =

This article lists events related to rail transport that occurred in 1809.

== Events ==
=== Unknown date events ===
- Opening of Poldice Railway, Cornwall, England.
- Dr Richard Griffiths opens the "Doctor's Tramroad" connecting collieries with the Glamorganshire Canal system at Treforest in South Wales (3.5 mi (5.6 km)). This includes a three-arch viaduct which still survives.
- A prototype for the Leiper Railroad, a horse drawn quarry rail line, was built in Nether Providence Township, Pennsylvania during the summer.

=== May events ===
- May – Completion of main construction railway at site of Bell Rock Lighthouse off the coast of Scotland.

== Births ==
=== February births ===
- February 3 – Thomas Swann, president of Baltimore and Ohio Railroad 1847–1853, is born (d. 1883).

=== August births ===
- August 4 – Samuel Morton Peto, English railway contractor (d. 1889).

=== October births ===
- October 10 - Nathaniel Worsdell, English carriage builder (d. 1886).
