= 1808 in rail transport =

This article lists events related to rail transport that occurred in 1808.

== Events ==
=== February events ===
- February 8 – The Washington Bridge Company is granted authority in Washington, D.C., to build the Long Bridge over the Potomac River, a bridge that will eventually be rebuilt to carry the first railroad tracks to cross the river.

=== May events ===
- May 27 – The Kilmarnock and Troon Railway becomes the first railway line in Scotland authorised by Act of Parliament.

=== July events ===
- July 8 through September 18 – Richard Trevithick's steam locomotive Catch Me Who Can is demonstrated in London.

== Births ==
=== January births ===
- January 8 – John A. Poor, first president of the Portland Company is born in Andover, Maine (d. 1871).

=== February births ===
- February 10 – John Edgar Thomson, president of the Pennsylvania Railroad 1852-1874 (d. 1874).

=== March births ===
- March 19 – Johann Andreas Schubert, builder of the first German steam locomotive, Saxonia, is born in Wernesgrün (d. 1870).

=== May births ===
- May 12 – Joseph Hamilton Beattie, locomotive engineer for London and South Western Railway 1850–1871 (d. 1871), is born.

=== July births ===
- July 25 – Francis Thompson, English architect working chiefly on railways (d. 1895).

=== Unknown date births ===
- George Muirson Totten, chief construction engineer for the Panama Railway (d. 1884).
