= 1877 in rail transport =

This article lists events related to rail transport that occurred in 1877.

== Events ==
=== May events ===
- May 1 – Opening of first railway in Burma (Myanmar), from Rangoon (Yangon) to Prome (Pyay) (257 km (160 mi) of metre gauge).

=== July events ===
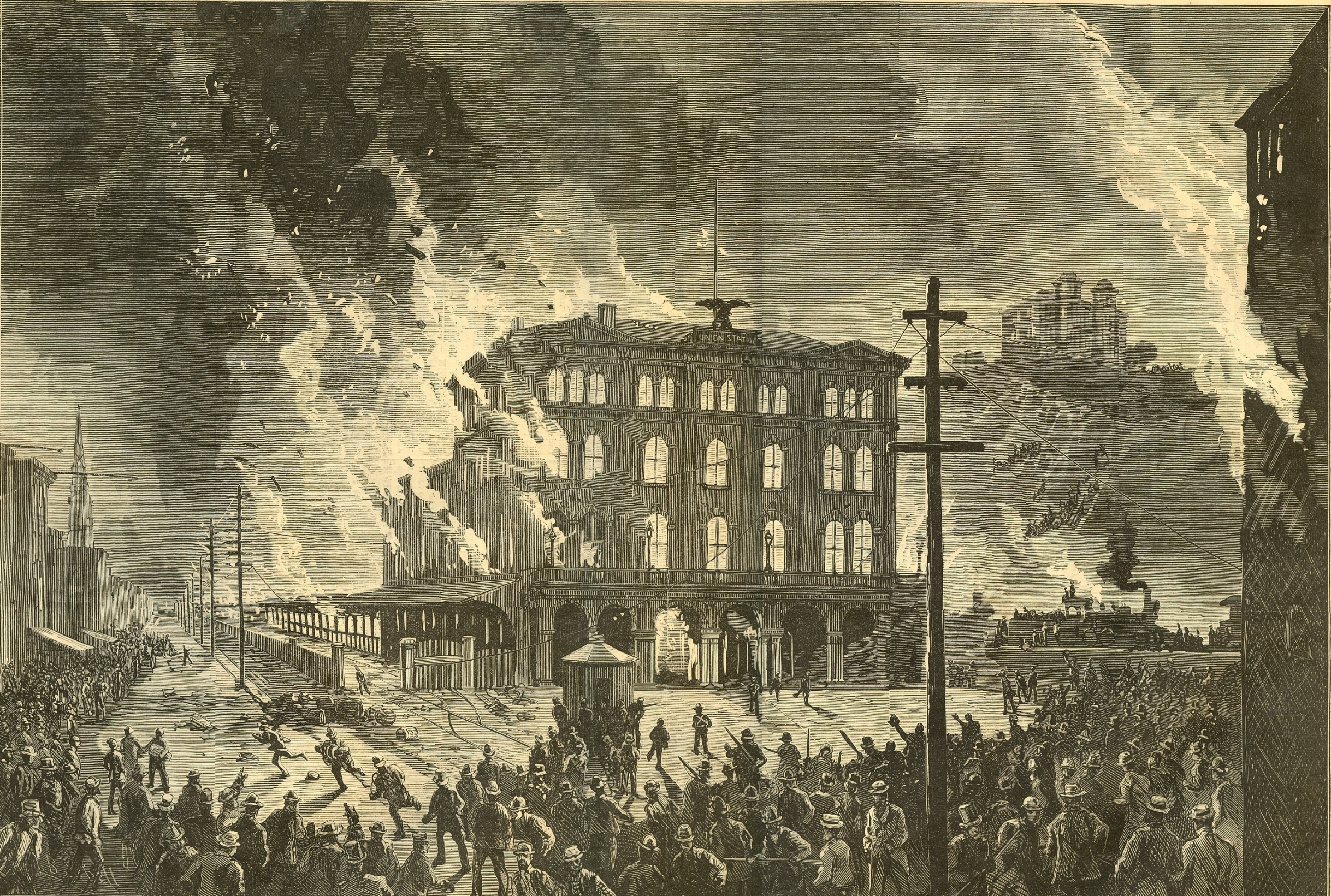
Burning of Union Depot, Pittsburgh, July 21–22 during Great Railroad Strike

- July 14 – Baltimore railroad strike of 1877: Workers on the Baltimore and Ohio Railroad walk off their jobs in an act that is seen as the start of the great railroad strike of 1877.
- July 16
  - Railroad workers on strike in Martinsburg, West Virginia, derail and loot a train; West Virginia Governor Henry M. Mathews calls on United States President Rutherford B. Hayes for Federal troops to break the strike.
  - The Nickey line, connecting Boxmoor to Harpenden in England, is officially opened.
- July 19 – The New York and Manhattan Beach Railway (later absorbed by the Long Island Rail Road) opens.
- July 20 – Baltimore and Ohio Railroad workers riot in Baltimore, Maryland. Nine railroad employees are killed as the Maryland militia attempts to quell the riot.
- July 21 – Baltimore and Ohio Railroad workers in Pittsburgh, Pennsylvania, stage a sympathy strike for the workers killed in Baltimore, Maryland the day before. Rioting erupts throughout Pittsburgh as a result.
- July 24 – Joel Tiffany is awarded U.S. patent 193,357 for his design of the first successful refrigerator car.

=== August events ===
- August 31 – The first 2 ft (610 mm) gauge narrow gauge railroad in America, the Billerica and Bedford Railroad, begins operations.

=== October events ===
- October 28 – Replacement Budapest-Nyugati Railway Terminal, constructed by Eiffel, opened in the Austro-Hungarian Empire.

=== November events ===
- November 4 – Opening of Gustave Eiffel's Maria Pia Bridge carrying the railway across the Douro into Porto, Portugal.

=== December events ===
- December 27 – The Quebec, Montreal, Ottawa and Occidental Railway opens, traversing a route from Montreal through Lachute to Hull.

=== Unknown date events ===
- Tracks of the Southern Pacific Railroad from Los Angeles, cross the Colorado River at Yuma, Arizona.
- William Henry Vanderbilt, son of Cornelius Vanderbilt, is promoted to President of the New York Central system.
- Second railway in Estonia connecting Tapa (on the Tallinn–Saint Petersburg line) with Tartu, the biggest city in Southern Estonia (at this time in the Governorate of Livonia) is opened.
- Opening of first public railway in Venezuela, the Bolivar Railway (Ferrocarril Bolívar, 2 ft (610 mm) gauge).
- Approximate date – Ephraim Shay develops the first Shay locomotive.

== Births ==
=== February births ===
- February 7 – Edgar Alcock, general manager and chairman of Hunslet Engine Company of Leeds, England (d. 1951).

=== March births ===
- March 7 – Walter Kidde, president of New York, Susquehanna and Western Railway 1937–1943 (d. 1943).

== Deaths ==
=== January deaths ===
- January 4 – Cornelius Vanderbilt, American financier who created the New York Central and Hudson River Railroad from the merger of several smaller New York railroads (b. 1794).

=== March deaths ===
- March 9 – Oliver Ames Jr., president of Union Pacific Railroad 1866–1871, brother of Oakes Ames (b. 1807).

=== April deaths ===
- April 22 – James P. Kirkwood, designer of Starrucca Viaduct (b. 1807).

=== May deaths ===
- May 19 – Matthew Baird, second owner of Baldwin Locomotive Works (b. 1817).

=== August deaths ===
- August 3 – William Butler Ogden, president of the Chicago and North Western Railway (b. 1805).

=== September deaths ===
- September 2 – Alvin Adams, founder of Adams Express, one of the first LCL freight companies in the United States, dies (b. 1804).

=== December events ===
- December 26 – Jean-Jacques Meyer, French-born steam locomotive designer (b. 1804)
