= Gridley Bryant =

American engineer (1789–1867)

- Born: August 26, 1789; Scituate, Massachusetts
- Died: June 13, 1867; Scituate, Massachusetts

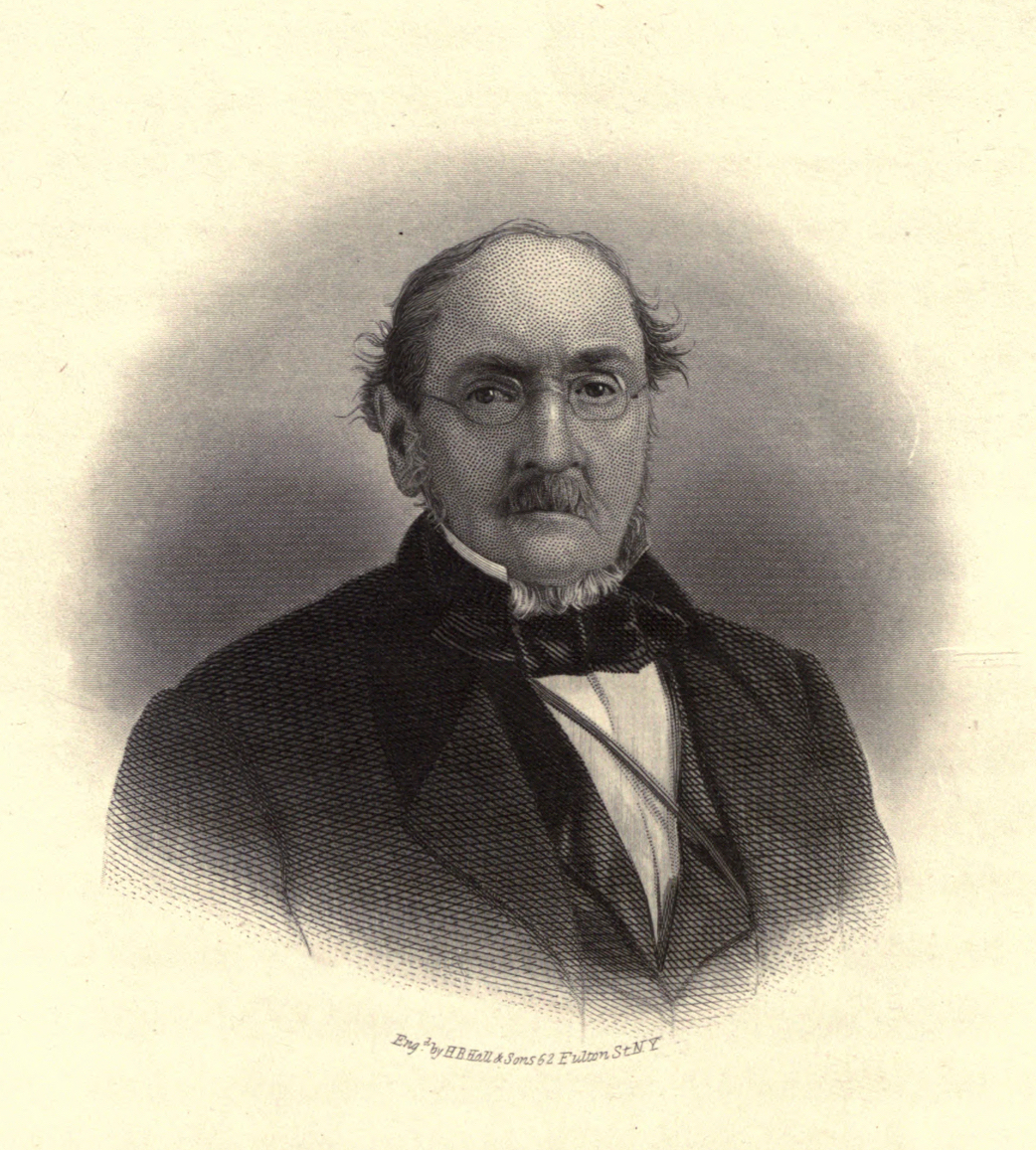
Gridley Bryant

Gridley Bryant (1789 – June 13, 1867) was an American construction engineer who ended up building the first commercial railroad in the United States and inventing most of the basic technologies involved in it. His son, Gridley James Fox Bryant, was a famous 19th-century architect and builder.

== Biography ==
Gridley Bryant was born in Scituate, Massachusetts on 26 August 1789. He was the son of Zina and Unice (Wade) Bryant. Gridley and Maria Winship Fox married on December 3, 1815.

Bryant invented a portable derrick in 1823 and soon gained a reputation as a master structure builder. He was awarded the contract to build the United States Bank in Boston, Massachusetts, and the Bunker Hill Monument in Charlestown, Massachusetts. Investigating how to move the granite needed for these projects from the quarry in Quincy to the work sites, he concluded that the best method would be via a railroad, much like that of the Liverpool and Manchester Railway which was still in the planning stages at the time. A reluctant state legislature granted Bryant a charter to build a railroad with Bunker Hill monument director Thomas Handasyd Perkins as the principal financier and owner of a majority of the shares. Construction began on the Granite Railway, one of the first railroads in North America, on April 1, 1826, with the first train operating on the railroad on October 7, 1826.

Since the railroad was essentially new technology, Bryant had to create the designs for nearly every aspect of the railroad, including the cars (4- and 8-wheel designs), track, switches, wheels, turntable, and load transfer equipment. He used similar developments and technologies that had already been in use on the railroads in England, but he modified his design to allow for heavier, more concentrated loads and a three-foot frost line. The major difference between Bryant's Granite Railway and the Liverpool and Manchester was in the motive power; Bryant was a gravity and horse-drawn railroad, while the Liverpool and Manchester used steam locomotives. Although he designed and created all the machinery, Bryant did not file patents on any of his inventions for the railroad. In 1834, Ross Winans filed a patent for the eight-wheel car design that Bryant had first invented. Bryant was called upon as an expert witness by the Baltimore and Ohio Railroad in an effort to invalidate Winans' patent.

== Autobiographical note ==
In an 1859 letter to Charles B. Stuart, Bryant wrote:

My opportunities for schooling were very limited, amounting to only a few months in each year, in a common country school; but I always had an innate desire to understand clearly the why and the wherefore of everything that existed, and I am indebted to the Hon. Edward Everett for many valuable observations in some of his earliest productions in regard to the necessity of studying principles by which means I have generally arrived at just conclusions.

I have always had a great desire for books, especially those that treated of mechanics and natural philosophy, and perhaps I have studied as much in my lifetime as people generally do. I have made, I think, some useful inventions; one in particular, which has been in use in every city and village in the country wherever there was a stone building to be erected. I mean the portable derrick which I invented in eighteen hundred and twenty-three, and used in building the United States Bank at Boston. This, with every other of my inventions, I have abandoned to the public. Every railroad in the country is now using my eight-wheeled car, and I have never received one cent for the invention. My turn-table has also been adopted by all railroads, as well as my switches and turnouts, nor have I been paid for services and expenses incurred in the lawsuits which were commenced against several railroad companies by Winans for his pretended invention of my eight-wheeled car, and which the Railroad Companies have since appropriated to themselves.
