= Eleazar Lord =

American author and educator

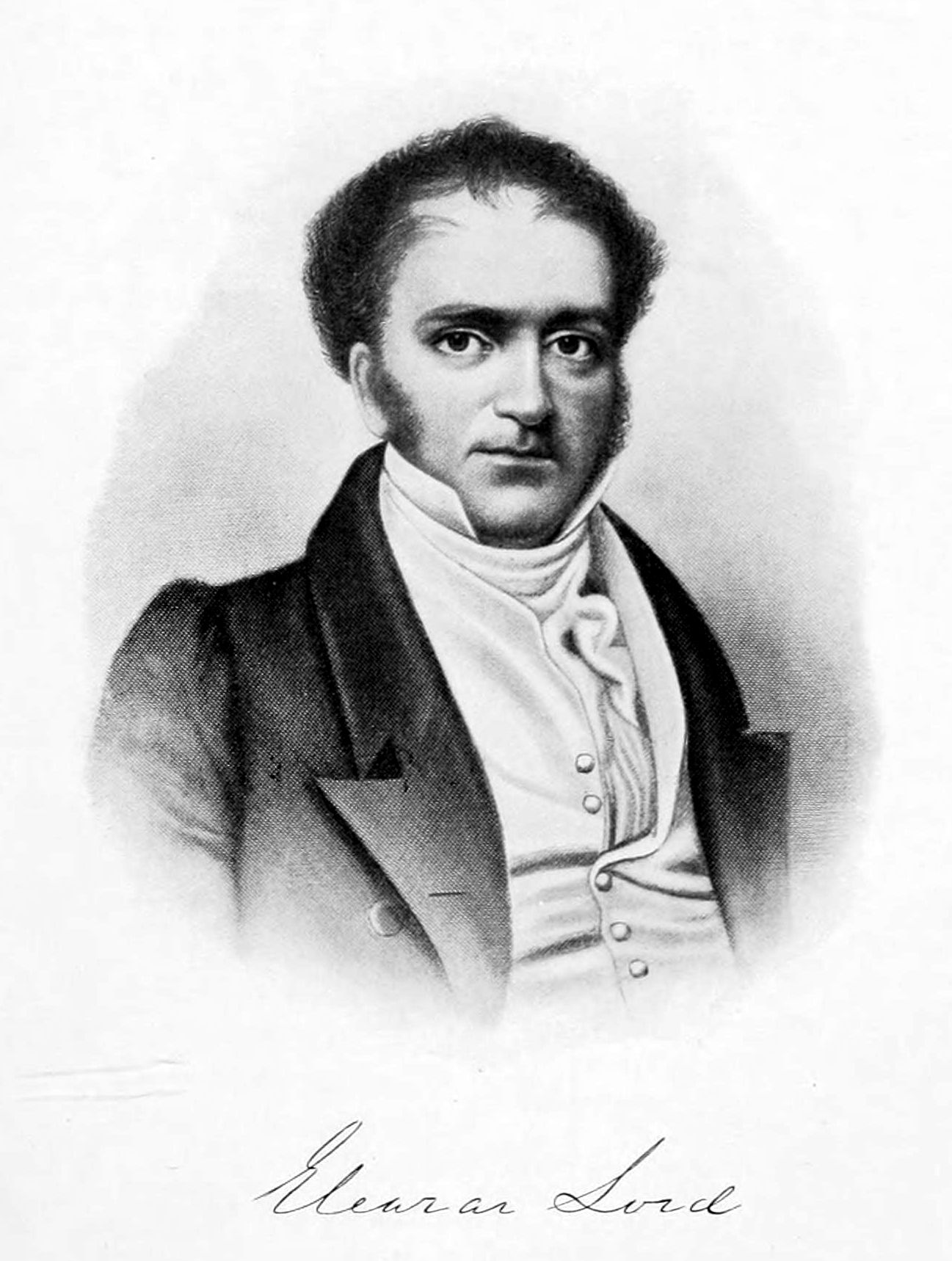
Eleazar Lord taken from a miniature likeness painted on ivory when he was 36 years old, and which was a gift from him to his betrothed, in 1824.

Eleazar Lord (September 9, 1788 – June 3, 1871) was an American author, educator, deacon of the First Protestant Dutch Church and first president of the Erie Railroad.

Lord was engaged in banking; founded the Manhattan insurance company, and served as its president 1821–34; was the first president of the Erie Railroad company; was a prominent friend of the New York university, and assisted in founding theological seminaries at East Windsor, Connecticut, and Auburn, New York.

His principal works are Principles of currency; Geological Cosmogony: and an edition of Lempriere's Biographical Dictionary, with numerous additions.

== Biography ==
=== Youth ===
Eleazar Lord was born September 9, 1788, at Franklin, Connecticut. His early boyhood was spent among the quiet scenes of that predictable countryside, where his elementary education was obtained in the district schools. At the age of sixteen, in 1804, he left home and began life as a clerk in a store at Norwich.

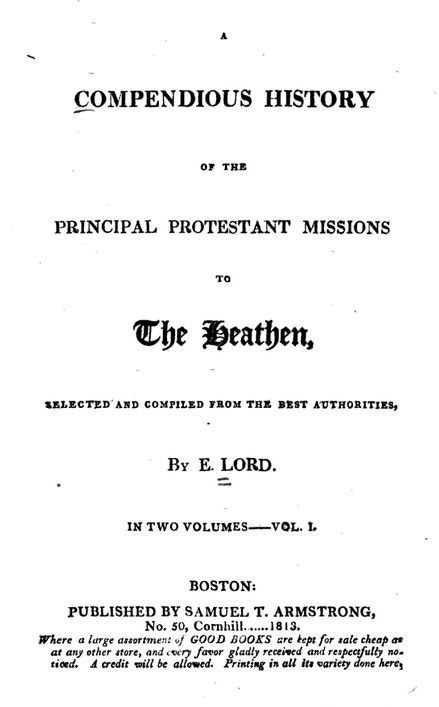
Title page of "A compendious history of the principal Protestant missions to the heathen," 1813.

In 1808 he returned home to prepare himself for college, under the direction of the Rev. Dr. Lee, of Lisbon, of whose church (Presbyterian) he became a member in 1809. After two years of preparatory study at Phillips Academy, Andover, he entered Andover Theological Seminary, and remained there three and a half years. While there he time deeply interested in the subject of Foreign Missions, an interest that remained active with him all his life.

He wrote the first pretentious work in the literature of that department of the church ever published in this country : "A History of the Principal Protestant Missions to the Heathen." It was published in 1813 at Boston.

=== From Salem N. H. and Princeton College to New York City ===
In September 1812, he was licensed to preach by the Haverhill Association at Salem, New Hampshire. He had no regular charge, but preached acceptably at various places for a year. He entered Princeton College, where for some months he attended the lectures and recitations of that celebrated institution. A serious affection of the eyes compelled him to give up his cherished position in life to devote himself to secular concerns, the exactions of which would not demand the sacrifice of his sight. He engaged actively in commercial and financial affairs, and while giving to them necessarily a large part of his time, his inclinations for religious work and its advancement were not permitted to languish in the slightest degree.

In 1815 he personally called a public meeting of the citizens of New York City to consider the subject of Sunday-schools, then an untried branch of church work. He organized the New York Sunday-school Union Society, and became its corresponding secretary. He spent much time in organizing Sunday-schools, and in editing and superintending the publication of Sunday-school literature. In 1816 he was a member of the convention in New York City that organized the American Bible Society. In March 1817, his eyes again warning him, he spent nearly a year and a half travelling in Europe. While abroad he met and established cordial relations with all the prominent reformers of the day, philanthropical, evangelical, and political, among them William Wilberforce, George Canning, Rowland Hill, Thomas Chalmers, Macaulay the elder, Sir Thomas Baring, and hosts of others. He returned to New York in 1818.

=== Businessman in New York City ===
In 1819 Lord was selected by the leading merchants of New York City to go to Washington in their interest as an advocate for the adoption by Congress of a protective tariff, which, they held, would be for the general good of the country. The measures he prepared were passed in 1820, but the businessmen of the Fast insisted that the tariff was not yet protective enough, and in 1823–24 Lord was sent to Washington to advocate still further tariff revision. His views were opposed by Henry Clay, John C. Calhoun, and all the Southern and some of the Western statesmen. His arguments were such, however, that Clay finally acquiesced in them, and used them in his subsequent speeches in and out of Congress, whence came Clay's fame as the "Father of the American System."

In 1821 Eleazar Lord obtained the charter for and organized the Manhattan Fire Insurance Company of New York, of which he was president twelve-years. During the management of Lord the Manhattan Company paid annually dividends of nine per cent.

In 1826, Lord was instrumental in the formation of the American Home Mission Society, of which he was the first corresponding secretary. He wrote the first annual report of this society.

Early in 1827 Dartmouth College and Williams College each conferred the degree of Master of Arts on Eleazar Lord. In that year the banking system then in operation in New York State had shown its utter inefficiency by the deplorable condition into which the banks had fallen, and Lord turned his attention toward placing it on a sounder basis. In 1828–29 he wrote and published a book entitled, "Credit, Currency and Banking," in which he recommended a system that he claimed would remedy the defects of the one prevailing. His recommendations became the foundation of what was known as the Free Banking System, and from the 1830s until it was replaced by the national banking law, it remained in force in New York State, and was adopted by others. When, during the emergency that came with the Civil War, the Committee on Ways and Means in Congress was devising a method to best sustain the finances of the country, Lord was summoned by it to give the benefit of his knowledge of and experience in practical finance. In response, he formulated the plan, and made the original draft of the bill authorizing its adoption, on which the present national banking system was established.

=== First President of Erie Railroad ===
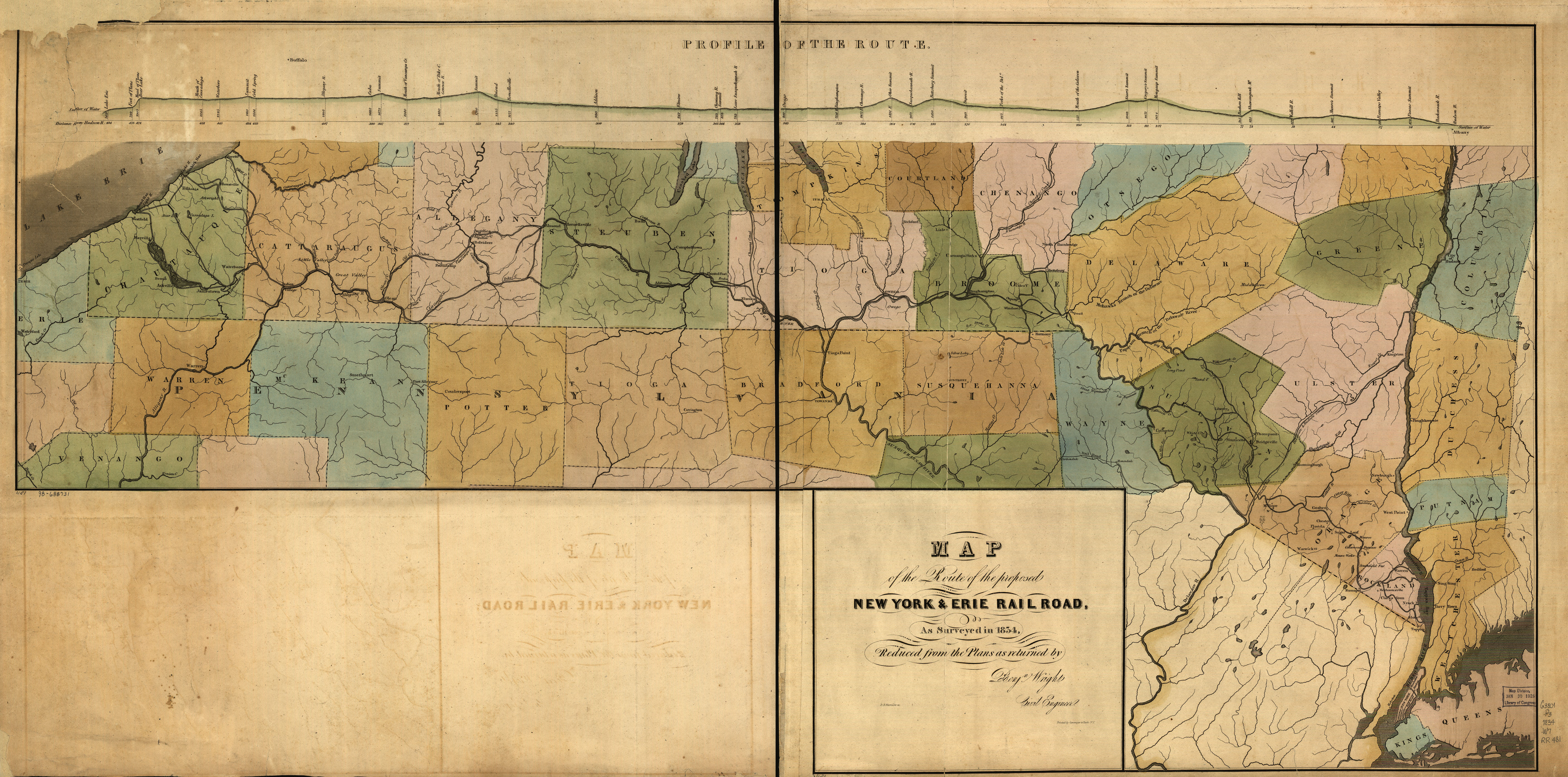
Map of the proposed route of New York & Erie Railroad, 1834.

Eleazar Lord was one of the originators of the New York and Erie Railroad Company, and had been instrumental in the chartering of the New York & Erie Railroad (NY&E) by the New York state legislature on April 24, 1832. He was elected its first president August 9, 1833.

Lord's "plan for the construction of the road through the Susquehanna Valley, and the work he did under that plan, may well be wondered at now, as it was then, but that his motives were honest, sincere, and intended for the promotion of the best interests of the company and the hastening of the enterprise to successful issue, not one of his most bitter detractors, if any are living to-day, would undertake to deny. His insistence on the six-foot gauge was also an unfortunate error in judgment. In spite of these, however, the fact remains that Eleazar Lord tided the New York and Erie Railroad Company over some of its darkest days."

Lord started living at Piermont, on the Hudson just north of the New Jersey state line. The village's name, in earlier years known as Tappan Landing, was given by Lord. Later in 1847 the cemetery of Sparkill, New York was created by Eleazar Lord. That Cemetery is known as Rockland Cemetery.

The Cemetery was organized by Eleazar Lord in 1847. He envisioned a cemetery that would become prominent as the final resting place for not only the deceased of the New York City area, but would be a magnet for notables on a national scale.

"Lord's busiest years were doubtless those of the Erie Railroad period, yet from 1831 to 1844 he wrote and published five books on scientific and religious subjects, besides numerous papers for magazines on similar subjects. From that time until 1866 he added to his literary work many volumes, having for their subjects finance, general and doctrinal theology, history and science, besides innumerable reviews for magazines and periodicals. During the same time he was in constant correspondence with most of the leading men in this and foreign countries. In 1866 the degree of Doctor of Laws was conferred upon him by the University of New York. In 1855 he published his 'Historical Review of the New York and Erie Railroad.'"

=== Family ===
"Lord married, July 12, 1824, Elizabeth Pierson, only daughter of Hon. Jeremiah H. Pierson, of Ramapo, N. Y. She died May 3, 1833. December 31, 1835, he married Ruth Thompson, daughter of Deacon Eben Thompson, of East Windsor, Conn. Seven children were born to him by his first wife. None survive but Sarah Pierson Lord Whiton, wife of W. H. Whiton, Esq. This daughter and her husband occupy the Lord homestead at Piermont-on-the-Hudson, where Eleazar Lord died, June 3, 1871, aged 83 years."

== Publications ==
- Eleazar Lord (1813) A Compendious History of the Principal Protestant Missions to the Heathen. Volume 1, and Volume II
- John Lemprière, Eleazar Lord (1825) Lempriere's Universal Biography: : Containing a Critical and Historical Account of the Lives, Characters, and Labours of Eminent Persons, in All Ages and Countries. Together with Selections of Foreign Biography from Watkin's Dictionary, Recently Published, and about Eight Hundred Original Articles of American Biography. Volume 2
- Eleazar Lord (1829) Principles of currency and banking
- Eleazar Lord (1831) Memoir of the Rev. Joseph Stibbs Christmas
- Eleazar Lord (1843) Geological Cosmogony. Or, An Examination of the Geological Theory of the Origin and Antiquity of the Earth, and of the Causes and Object of the Changes it Has Undergone New York: Robert Carter.
- Eleazar Lord (1845) The Mediatorial Work of Our Lord Jesus Christ
- Eleazar Lord (1851) The scripture doctrine contrasted with geological theory.
- Eleazar Lord (1853) The messiah
- Eleazar Lord (1855) A historical review of the New York and Erie Railroad
- Eleazar Lord (1858) The Plenary Inspiration of the Scriptures

Business positions
Preceded by new position	President of Erie Railroad; 1833–1835	Succeeded by James G. King
Preceded by James G. King	President of Erie Railroad; 1839–1841	Succeeded by James Bowen
Preceded by Horatio Allen	President of Erie Railroad; 1844–1845	Succeeded by Benjamin Loder
