= Association de jeunes pour l'entretien et la conservation des trains d'autrefois =

AJECTA
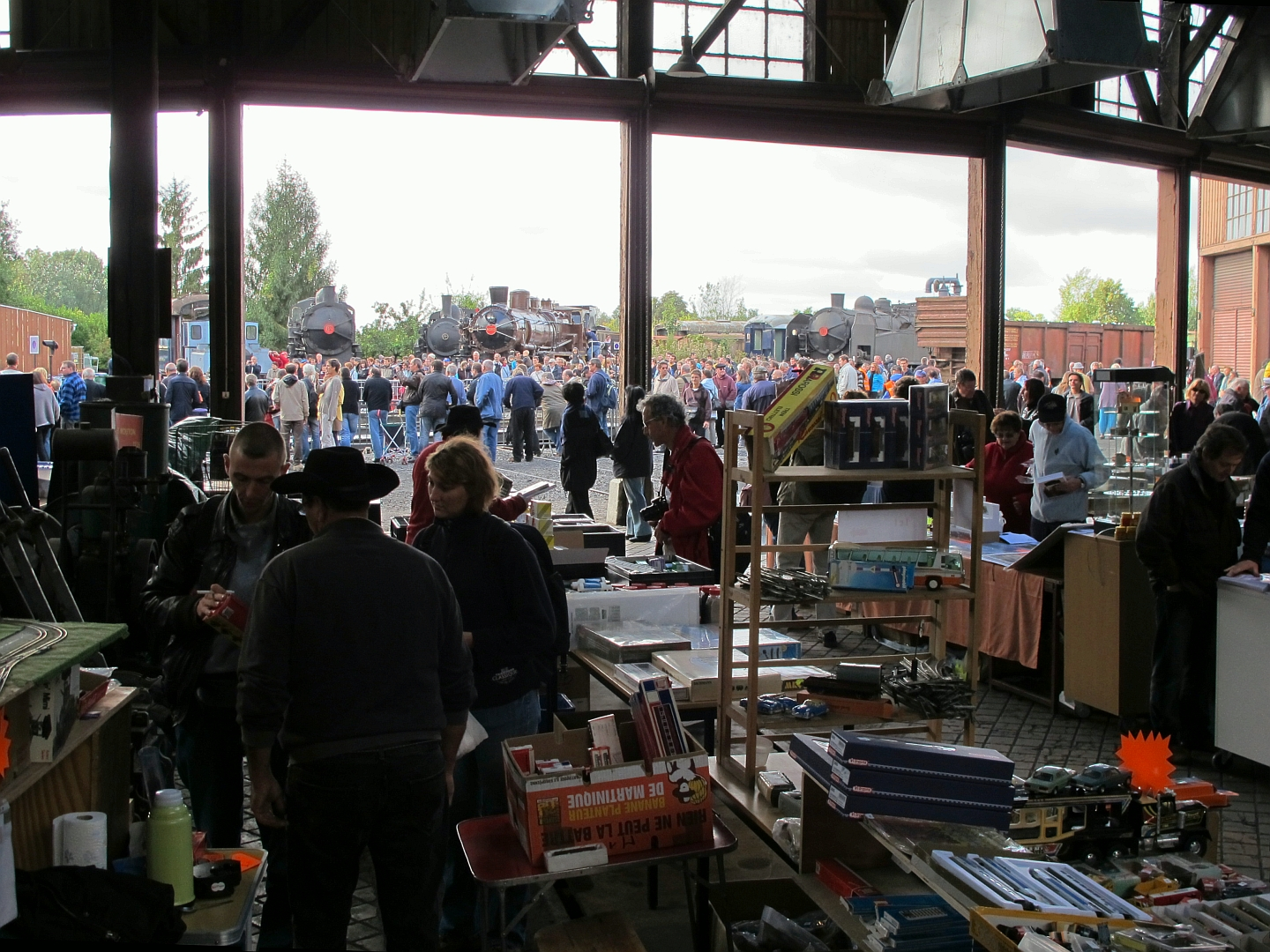
- Interactive fullscreen map
- Established: November 8, 1968; 57 years ago
- Location: Longueville
- Coordinates: 48°30′42″N 3°15′17″E
- Type: Railway museum
- Website: https://www.ajecta.fr/

The Association de jeunes pour l'entretien et la conservation des trains d'autrefois (AJECTA) - Association of Young People for the Maintenance and Preservation of Old Trains - are a French railway heritage organisation based at Longueville depot in Seine-et-Marne. They safeguard and restore railway rolling stock and manage a railway museum on the same site.

== History ==
At the end of the 1960s steam trains were being eliminated from the French railway network. Tourist lines were being formed and a group of passionate young people from the Paris area came together to form AJECTA.

The society was formed in 1968, with the intention of reopening the CFD metre gauge line from Florac to Ste.Cécile-d'Andorge. This project was not successful, so AJECTA turned to standard gauge. They initially investigated taking over the former Esternay depot but instead found the Longueville was available. Spurred by progress being made by other groups they opened negotiations with SNCF.

By 1971, AJECTA had entered into a shared agreement to use the depot site. With progress being made more members were attracted to the organisation. Their first locomotives, 040-TA-137 and 130-B-476 were delivered in July 1971 and on the 14th 040-TA-137 was steamed for the first time.

== Musée vivant du chemin de fer ==
AJECTA first moved into the former Compagnie des chemins de fer de l'Est depot buildings in 1971. Over time their display of equipment and artefacts has expanded and the depot became a museum. It has benefited from the phased restoration work on the roundhouse, supported in particular by the French Fondation du patrimoine.

From their first acquisitions of 130 B 476 and 040 TA 137 in 1971 through to 241 P 30 which arrived in 2019, the Longueville living railway museum has assembled the largest collection of standard gauge steam locomotives that a French railway association has been able to assemble. Alongside the 14 steam locomotives they have over 100 items of other rolling stock.

== Collection ==
=== Steam locomotives ===
Original railway	Number and name	Type or class	Builder	Works number	Built	Wheels	Notes	Image
Cie du Nord, Sucrerie de Vaumoise	No. 4.853	040	Société J. F. Cail & Cie		1866	0-8-0	Static display Classé MH (1988)	
CFE Gudmont-Rimaucourt, later Sucrerie de Nangis			Ernest Goüin & Cie	3032	1887	0-6-0T	Out of service	
Cimenterie de Dannes Camiers	No. 2 bis		Cockerill	1930	1896	0-4-0T	Operational	
Cie du Nord, SNCF	3.628; 230 D 116	230 Nord 3.513 à 3.662	Henschel		1911	4-6-0	Static display Classé MH (2021)	
Cie de l'Est, SNCF, CFTA	141 TB 407		ANF Blanc-Misseron		1913		Operational Classé MH (1988)	
État, SNCF	140 C 231	État 140	North British		1916	2-8-0	Operational Classé MH (2003)	
Tréfilerie de Fourchambault	No. 105		Corpet-Louvet	1548	1918	0-4-0T	Static Display	
Mines de La Houve, later Port de Givet	No. 3467		Schneider		1920	0-6-0T	Static Display	
État, later SNCF	040 TA 137				1922	0-4-0T	Static Display	
État, SNCF, CFTA	141 TC 19		Fives-Lille		1922		Static display Classé MH (1990)	
Cie de l'Est, SNCF, CFTA	130 B 348		Ateliers d'Epernay		1922	2-6-0	Static Display	
Cie de l'Est, SNCF, CFTA	130 B 476		Ateliers d'Epernay		1922	2-6-0	Static Display Classé MH (1988)	
USATC	4383; 030 TU 22		Davenport	2532	1943	0-6-0T	Out of service	
SNCF	241 P 30 (et son tender 34-P-272)		Schneider in Creusot		1951		Under cosmetic restoration. Exported to Switzerland 1972 and returned to France June 2019.	

=== Diesel locomotives and locotracteurs ===
Original railway	Number and name	Type or class	Builder	Works number	Built	Wheels	Notes	Image
Usine Schneider-Westinghouse (SW) de Champagne-sur-Seine.	AE 104		Schneider	No. 485	1928			
Port de Givet	T 106		Baudet, Donon et Roussel	No. 548	1956			
Centrale thermique de Porcheville	T 931		CAFL / CEM		1955			
SNCF	Y 2507	SNCF Class Y 2400	Decauville		1969	0-4-0DM	Operational. Acquired March 1994	
SNCF	Y 6571	SNCF Class Y 6400	De Dietrich		1957	Bo	Operational. Acquired 13 August 1991	Y 6571
SNCF	BB 63855	SNCF Class BB 63500	Brissonneau and Lotz		1964	Bo-Bo	Out of service. Passed to AJECTA 1 January 2010, engine failure in 2019.	
SNCF	A1A A1A 68506	SNCF Class A1AA1A 68500	CAFL / CEM / Fives-Lille-Cail		1965	A1A'A1A'	Under restoration. Acquired 15 September 2003	

=== Electric locomotive ===
Original railway	Number and name	Type or class	Builder	Works number	Built	Wheels	Notes	Image
SNCF	BB 12114	SNCF Class BB 12000	SFAC - SW - Jeumont,		1960	BoBo	Static display. Preserved April 1999. Transferred from Cité du train - Patrimoine SNCF Jan 2024.	
