= List of tourist railways in France =

List of tourist railways in France contains all railways in France oriented towards tourists organized by rail gauge.

== Standard gauge (open) ==
- Chemin de fer touristique de la vallée de l'Aa
- Train touristique de l'Albret
- Chemin de fer touristique de la Brévenne
- Tour du Cantal en train
- Chemins de fer du Centre-Bretagne
- Train touristique du centre-Var
- Chemin de fer Charente-Limousine
- Chemin de fer touristique du Cotentin
- Train touristique Étretat-Pays de Caux
- Chemin de fer de la vallée de l'Eure
- Chemin de fer du Haut Forez
- Gentiane express
- Train touristique de Guîtres à Marcenais
- Chemin de fer touristique du Haut Quercy
- Train des mouettes
- Chemin de fer touristique Pontarlier-Vallorbe
- Train touristique de Puisaye-Forterre
- Chemin de fer touristique du Rhin
- Chemin de fer touristique de la Sarthe
- Train à vapeur thouarsais
- Cercle Ferroviaire des Territoires de Sologne et Touraine
- Chemin de fer touristique du sud des Ardennes
- Train Thur Doller Alsace
- Chemin de fer touristique de la Traconne
- La Vapeur du Trieux
- Ligne de Vaivre à Gray
- Chemin de fer de la Vendée
- Chemin de fer touristique du Vermandois
- Train Vienne-Vézère-Vapeur

== Narrow gauge (open) ==
- Chemin de fer d'Abreschviller
- Chemin de fer touristique d'Anse
- Petit train d'Artouste
- Chemin de fer de la Baie de Somme
- Train du Bas-Berry
- Train à vapeur du Beauvaisis
- Chemin de fer du Blanc-Argent
- Chemin de fer de Bon-Repos
- Chemin de fer touristique de la vallée de la Canner
- Tramway du Cap-Ferret
- Train du pays Cathare et du Fenouillèdes
- Ligne de Cerdagne
- Train à vapeur des Cévennes
- Chemin de fer des Chanteraines
- Train touristique du Cotentin
- Chemins de fer du Creusot
- Tramway touristique de la vallée de la Deûle
- Panoramique des Dômes
- Froissy Dompierre Light Railway
- Chemin de fer du Haut-Rhône
- P'tit train de la Haute Somme
- Train touristique des Lavières
- Train touristique du Livradois-Forez
- Tramway du Mont-Blanc
- Chemin de fer du Montenvers
- Chemin de fer de La Mure
- Chemin de Fer de Semur en Vallon
- Chemin de fer de la vallée de l'Ouche
- Petit Train du Parc Thermal
- Chemin de fer du Val de Passey
- Tramway de Pithiviers à Toury
- Chemins de fer de Provence
- Chemin de fer de la Rhune
- Chemin de fer de Rillé
- Le p'tit train de Saint-Trojan
- Compagnie du chemin de fer de Semur-en-Vallon
- Tacot des Lacs
- Chemin de Fer Touristique du Tarn
- Velay Express
- Chemin de fer touristique du fort de Villey-le-Sec
- Chemin de fer du Vivarais
- Chemin de Fer Historique de la Voie Sacrée
- Le P'tit train de l'Yonne

== Museums ==
- AJECTA
- Train à vapeur d'Auvergne
- Association des chemins de fer des Côtes-du-Nord
- MTVS
- Train touristique du musée de la mine de Noyant-d'Allier
- Matériel Ferroviaire Patrimoine National
- Musée des transports de Pithiviers
- Pacific Vapeur Club
- Quercyrail
- Train historique de Toulouse
