= 1887 in rail transport =

This article lists events related to rail transport that occurred in 1887.

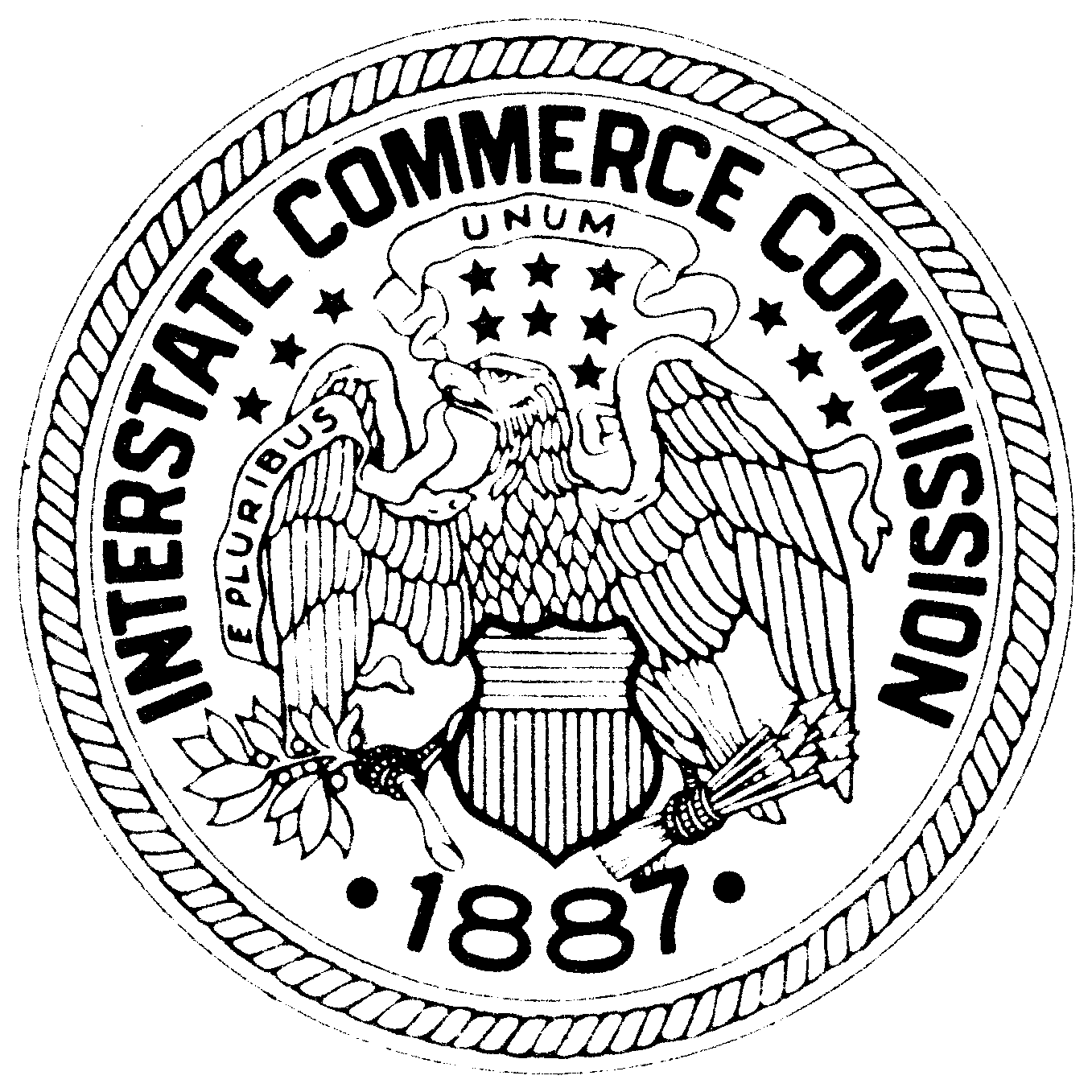
Seal of the U.S. Interstate Commerce Commission, an independent agency from 1887 to 1995, which monitored railroads to ensure that they complied with the Interstate Commerce Act of 1887.

== Events ==
=== January events ===
- January 28 – Jay Gould purchases the Little Rock, Mississippi River and Texas Railway at foreclosure then deeds it to the St. Louis, Iron Mountain and Southern Railroad.

=== February events ===
- February 4 – The Interstate Commerce Act in the United States is signed into law, creating the Interstate Commerce Commission to regulate the prices for hauling freight on American railroads.

=== April events ===
- April 20 – The North British Railway's Tay Bridge across the Firth of Tay in Scotland, reconstructed after its collapse in 1879, is reopened and then shortly closed thereafter.
- April 26 – At 11:00 am a silver spike is driven in a ceremony in Indian Territory connecting the Kansas and Texas branches of the Atchison, Topeka and Santa Fe Railroad. The town of Purcell, Oklahoma, rises at the location, named in honor of ATSF railroad director Edward Benton (E.B.) Purcell, of Manhattan, Kansas.

=== May events ===
- May 20 – Atchison, Topeka and Santa Fe Railway consolidates eight of its subsidiary railroads in California into the California Central Railway.
- May 31 – The first Atchison, Topeka and Santa Fe Railway train over the newly constructed San Bernardino and Los Angeles Railroad line arrives in Los Angeles.

=== June events ===
- June – The Péchot-Bourdon locomotive is patented in France.
- June 9 – Construction of the first railway in Taiwan, between Keelung and Taipei began.
- June 20 – The Great Indian Peninsula Railway officially opens Victoria Terminus in Bombay.

=== July events ===
- July 13 – The Chateaugay Railway, a predecessor of the Delaware and Hudson Railway, is incorporated.
- July 20 – The Youngstown, Lawrence and Pittsburg Railroad and the Ashtabula, Niles and Youngstown Railroad, both in Ohio, are merged to form the Pittsburg, Youngstown and Ashtabula Railroad (a Pennsylvania Railroad subsidiary).

=== October events ===
- October 11
  - St. Louis Southwestern Railway predecessor Paragould and Buffalo Island Railway, in Arkansas, is incorporated.
  - The New York and Northern Railway (a predecessor name for the New York and Putnam Railroad) emerges from reorganization after foreclosure the previous July.

=== November events ===
- November 10 – Canada Atlantic Railway becomes the first Canadian railway to use steam from a train's locomotive to heat the passenger cars instead of coal or wood stoves in each car.
- November 13 – The Union Pacific Railroad, Central Pacific Railroad, and Chicago and North Western Railway introduce the Overland Flyer passenger train between Chicago and San Francisco.

=== December events ===
- December 31 – Spokane International Railroad begins operations.

=== Unknown date events ===
- Rebuilding of Gare Saint-Lazare terminus of the Chemins de fer de l'Ouest in Paris is completed.
- Rebuilding of New London Union Station of the Central Vermont Railway in New London, Connecticut, is completed to the design of Henry Hobson Richardson.
- Colorado Midland completes construction of the Hagerman Tunnel.
- Tapa–Tartu railway in Estonia is extended to Valga where it connects to the Riga–Pskov line.
- The first battery rail car is used on the Royal Bavarian State Railways.
- Reuben Wells is appointed as shop superintendent of American steam locomotive manufacturing company Rogers Locomotive and Machine Works.
- Stuyvesant Fish becomes president of the Illinois Central.

== Births ==
=== March births ===
- March 9 – Nathaniel Lamson Howard, president of Chicago Great Western Railway 1925–1929 (d. 1949).

=== September births ===
- September 5 – Charles Fairburn, Chief Mechanical Engineer of the London, Midland and Scottish Railway 1944–1945 (d. 1945).

== Deaths ==
=== April deaths ===
- April 19 – Alexander Mitchell, president of Chicago, Milwaukee and St. Paul Railway 1864–1887 (b. 1817).
- April 20 – Horatio G. Brooks, founder of Brooks Locomotive Works (b. 1828).

=== July deaths ===
- July 4 – Anson P. Morrill, president of Maine Central Railroad 1864–1866 and 1873–1875 (b. 1803).

=== August deaths ===
- August 14 – Aaron Augustus Sargent, American journalist, lawyer and politician; authored the first Pacific Railroad Act (b. 1827)
