= Hagerman Pass =

Mountain pass in Colorado, USA

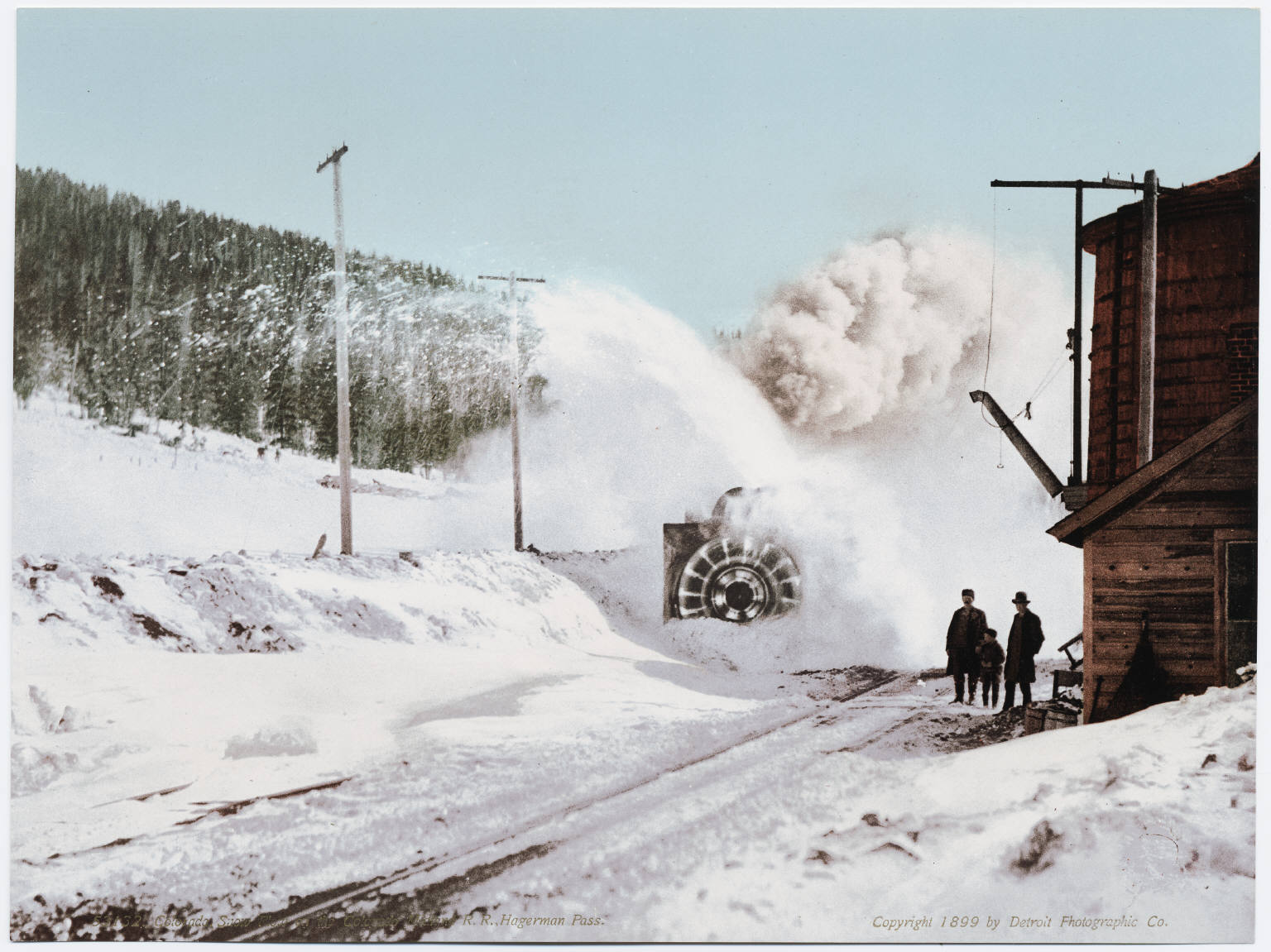
- A train in Hagerman Pass, 1899
- Interactive map of Hagerman Pass
- Elevation: 11,925 ft (3,635 m)
- Traversed by: Unpaved road

Third Approach
- Location: Lake–Pitkin county border, Colorado, U.S.
- Range: Sawatch Range
- Coordinates: 39°15′54″N 106°29′02″W
- Topo map: USGS Homestake Reservoir

Hagerman Pass, elevation 11,925 ft (3,635 m), is a high mountain pass that crosses the continental divide in the Rocky Mountains of central Colorado in the United States. The pass traverses the Sawatch Range west of Leadville, connecting the headwaters of the Arkansas River on the east with the upper valley of the Fryingpan River above Basalt, in the basin of the Colorado River.

The pass was named for James J. Hagerman, builder of the Colorado Midland Railroad. The Colorado Midland railroad crossed the continental divide through one of two tunnels (initially the Hagerman Tunnel (1887), later the Busk-Ivanhoe Tunnel (1893) at lower altitude) near the top of Hagerman pass. The latter tunnel now serves as a water diversion tunnel draining Ivanhoe Lake on the west side of the pass into the Arkansas River basin.

In 1909, the Shoshone Transmission Line was built to connect a generating station near Glenwood Springs with Leadville and Denver. This historic electric transmission line has been modernized several times and is still in use.

The pass is traversed by an unimproved road that is passable only with four-wheel drive vehicles, bicycles, ATVs, or on foot. Two-wheel drive vehicles will find it difficult due to some stream crossings and rocky sections. It is open from approximately late May through the arrival of the first heavy snow in mid or late autumn. The road has occasionally been blocked by fallen trees.

== Climate ==
Climate data for Hagerman Pass 39.2652 N, 106.4828 W, Elevation: 11,929 ft (3,636 m) (1991–2020 normals)
| Month | Jan | Feb | Mar | Apr | May | Jun | Jul | Aug | Sep | Oct | Nov | Dec | Year |
|---|---|---|---|---|---|---|---|---|---|---|---|---|---|
| Mean daily maximum °F (°C) | 24.2 (−4.3) | 25.4 (−3.7) | 32.8 (0.4) | 39.5 (4.2) | 47.7 (8.7) | 58.6 (14.8) | 64.2 (17.9) | 61.9 (16.6) | 55.5 (13.1) | 44.0 (6.7) | 31.7 (−0.2) | 23.7 (−4.6) | 42.4 (5.8) |
| Daily mean °F (°C) | 13.4 (−10.3) | 14.2 (−9.9) | 20.2 (−6.6) | 26.4 (−3.1) | 35.0 (1.7) | 45.0 (7.2) | 51.1 (10.6) | 49.3 (9.6) | 42.8 (6.0) | 32.3 (0.2) | 21.1 (−6.1) | 13.5 (−10.3) | 30.4 (−0.9) |
| Mean daily minimum °F (°C) | 2.7 (−16.3) | 2.9 (−16.2) | 7.5 (−13.6) | 13.2 (−10.4) | 22.3 (−5.4) | 31.4 (−0.3) | 37.9 (3.3) | 36.8 (2.7) | 30.0 (−1.1) | 20.6 (−6.3) | 10.4 (−12.0) | 3.3 (−15.9) | 18.3 (−7.6) |
| Average precipitation inches (mm) | 3.70 (94) | 3.31 (84) | 3.40 (86) | 4.24 (108) | 3.30 (84) | 1.47 (37) | 1.91 (49) | 1.96 (50) | 2.51 (64) | 2.84 (72) | 3.47 (88) | 2.96 (75) | 35.07 (891) |
Source: PRISM Climate Group
