= J. J. Hagerman =

American businessman (1838–1909)

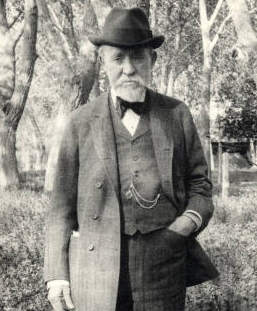
- J. J. Hagerman, late in life
- Born: James John Hagerman; March 23, 1838 near Port Hope, Upper Canada
- Died: September 13, 1909 (aged 71); Milan, Italy
- Education: University of Michigan
- Occupation: industrialist

James John Hagerman (March 23, 1838 – September 13, 1909) was an American industrialist who owned mines, railroads and corporate farms in the American West in the late 19th and early 20th centuries. He was one of the most influential men in territorial New Mexico.

== Early life ==
J. J. Hagerman was born March 23, 1838, near Port Hope, Upper Canada. His parents were James and Margaret (Crawford) Hagerman, immigrants of Scandinavian descent. The family moved to Newport, Michigan, in 1843. The family became naturalized United States citizens in 1848.

Hagerman went to the University of Michigan in 1857. While in college, Hagerman took a job as a clerk with the Milwaukee Iron Company, a manufacturer of railroad ties. He continued working there after graduation in 1861, and by 1863 had so impressed the company's owners that he was made business manager of the firm.

Hagerman married Anna Osborne in 1867. The couple had two sons, Percy and Herbert.

J. J. Hagerman contracted pulmonary tuberculosis in 1873. Although he recovered, his health was greatly weakened for the remainder of his life.

As the country recovered from the Panic of 1873, Hagerman anticipated the increased need for iron ore. When the Menominee Mining Company was organized in 1877, Hagerman became an investor in and president of the firm. Using his knowledge of iron deposits gained while working for the Milwaukee Iron Co., Hagerman enabled the firm to become highly successful. The company's first successful iron operation was the Norway Mine. Hagerman built the nearby town of Norway, Michigan, to provide housing and services for the company's employees.

Hagerman's health deteriorated in 1881, and he moved to Switzerland. The family soon left for Italy, and purchased a residence in Milan.

== Colorado ventures ==
With Hagerman's health somewhat restored, and he and his family returned to the U.S. in 1884. He moved to Colorado Springs, Colorado, hoping that the dry air and high altitude would continue to improve his health. (See Tuberculosis treatment in Colorado Springs).

Hagerman built the Hagerman Mansion and quickly became involved in local business. He built an office building and became a major stockholder in the First National Bank.

=== Colorado Midland Railway ===
Hagerman's new-found interest, however, was in railroads. In June 1885, Hagerman gained control of the Colorado Midland Railway, which ran from Colorado Springs to Buena Vista. Hagerman sought to expand the railroad to Aspen and Grand Junction, and possibly west to Utah. He bored the Hagerman Tunnel through the Sawatch Mountains, and completed the line to Grand Junction in 1888. Hagerman also used lucrative coal mines to not only power his railroad but also to sell coke to the Leadville smelters. In 1890, Hagerman sold the railroad to the Atchison, Topeka and Santa Fe Railway.

=== Mollie Gibson mine ===
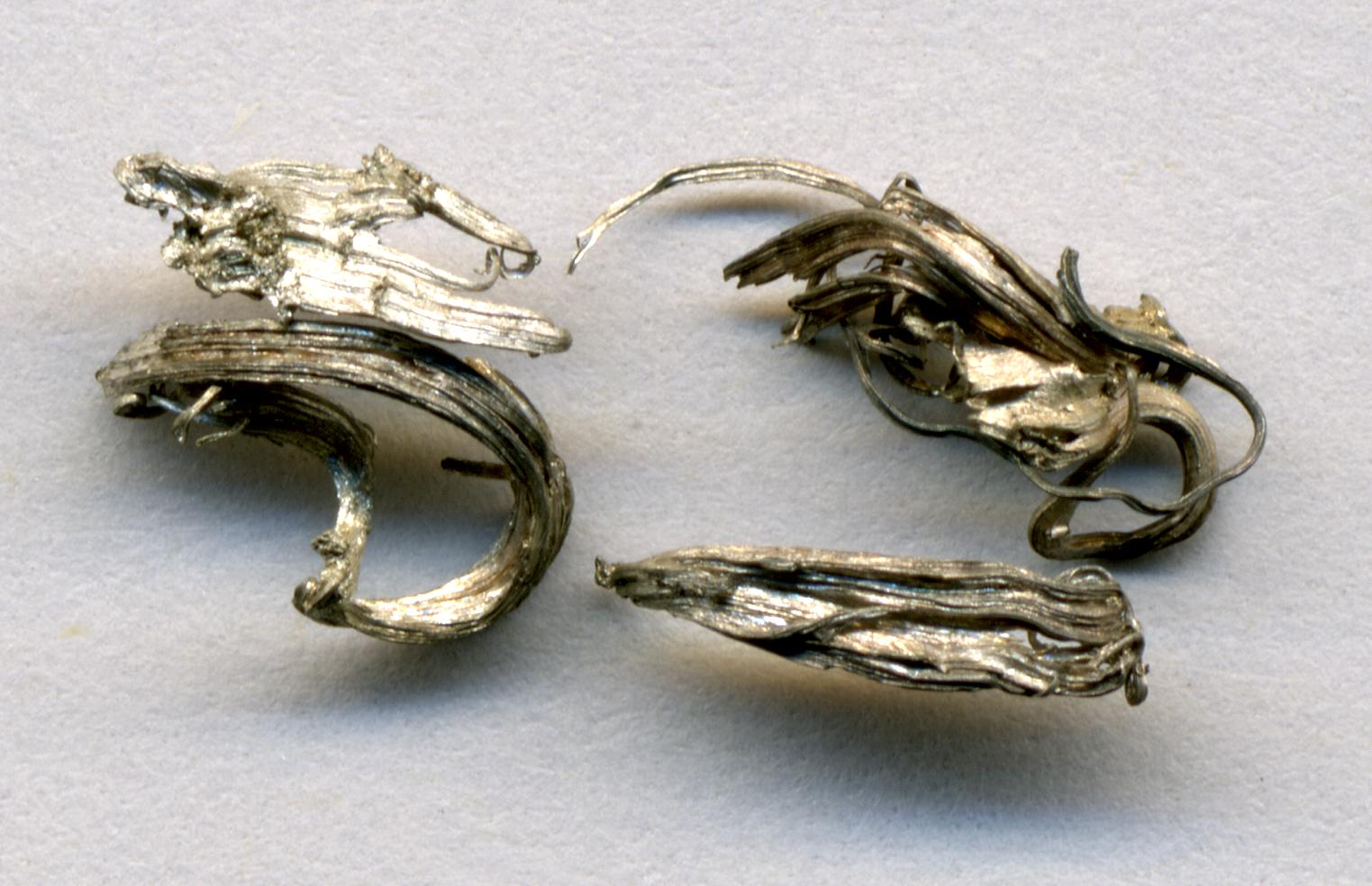
Silver wire (~3-5 mm each) from the Mollie Gibson Mine

A miner at heart, Hagerman was not about to be left out of the silver boom hitting the region. H.B. Gillespie, a mine owner in the region who had been involved in several major silver strikes, owned the Mollie Gibson mine, near Aspen. A major silver vein had been discovered in the mine, but Gillespie was convinced that the vein also ran under a number of other, nearby mines. Seeking capital to purchase these properties before news of the strike got out, Gillespie contacted Hagerman, who agreed to invest heavily in the new company. In 1890, the Mollie Gibson Mining & Milling Company was organized with Gillespie as manager and Hagerman as president. The company quickly purchased the Lone Pine, Silver King and Sargent mines and invested heavily in the Emma and other smaller mines. The company announced its silver strike on December 9, 1890. The combined Mollie Gibson mine became the richest silver mine in the world until that time.

Still suffering from the effects of tuberculosis, Hagerman moved to New Mexico in 1892. But he retained his Colorado holdings, and took an active hand in managing his interests there.

The Panic of 1893 and repeal of the Sherman Silver Purchase Act caused the value of silver to collapse. But the price of gold remained unaffected, and the gold mining industry was still strong. A major gold strike near Cripple Creek, Colorado, led Hagerman to become involved in gold mining.

=== Isabella gold mine and the Cripple Creek strike ===
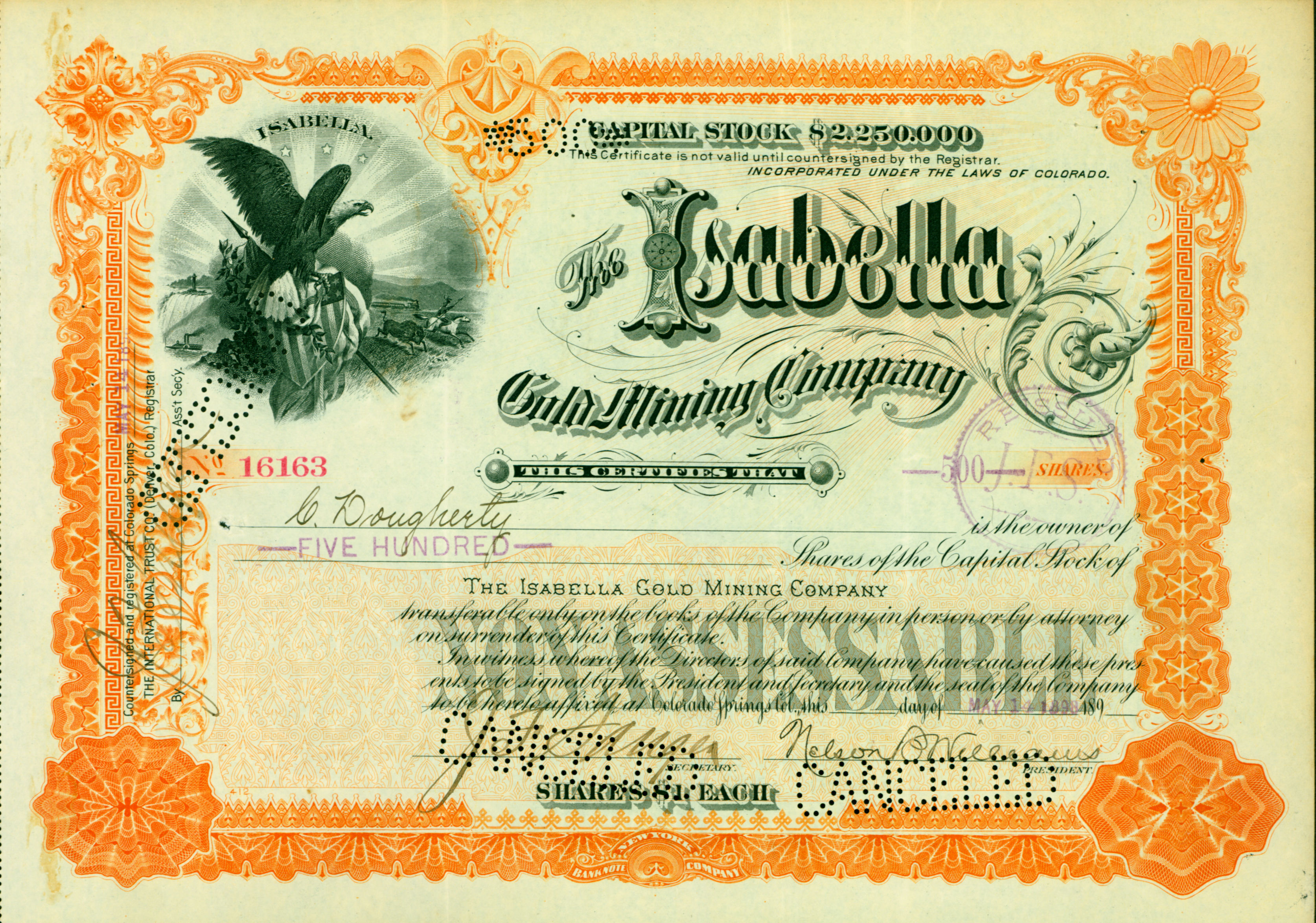
Share of the Isabella Gold Mining Company, issued May 14, 1898

Hagerman was approached by the owners of the Buena Vista mine, who were convinced that properties adjacent to their claim also contained gold. Following the pattern established in Aspen, Hagerman and his partners purchased 22 adjoining properties and formed the Isabella Gold Mining Company. The mine became a major success.

Hagerman was one of three mine owners to precipitate the Cripple Creek miners' strike of 1894. The mine owners, who employed about a third of the miners in the area, extended the work-day to 10 hours. At the time, this was the best pay for miners anywhere in the United States. The workers, represented by the Western Federation of Miners, struck. Although some smaller mining companies capitulated immediately, some owners raised a paramilitary force under the legal protection of the local sheriff. After a tense and somewhat violent standoff, the governor sent in the state militia to protect the miners. Hagerman was nominated by the other mine owners to handle the conflict and agreed to return to the eight-hour day. It was seen by some as a major victory for the union.

In 1898, Hagerman sold his stake in the Isabella Gold Mining Company and turned his remaining Colorado interests over to his son, Percy.

== New Mexico ventures ==
J. J. Hagerman took up residence in New Mexico in 1892. Hagerman had purchased John Chisum's Jingle Bob Ranch (now known as the Old South Spring Ranch) near Roswell in Chaves County. He built extensively on the ranch, and founded the nearby town of Hagerman to accommodate his family's needs and his financial interests.

Hagerman quickly decided to build rail and irrigation concerns in the region to enlarge his holdings.

In 1895 Hagerman donated the flat land atop North Hill in Roswell to New Mexico Military Institute, allowing the school to reopen in Fall 1898.

=== Pecos Valley Railroad ===
Prior to his move to New Mexico, in 1890 Hagerman incorporated the Pecos Valley Railroad to construct a railroad from Pecos, Texas, to Eddy (now Carlsbad), New Mexico, along the Pecos River. Hagerman wanted his line to connect with the Texas and Pacific Railway to improve local access to markets. The Pecos Valley Railroad was completed in 1890.

The discovery of a major artesian aquifer in the area in 1891 led Hagerman to extend his railroad. Hagerman reorganized the company and formed the Pecos Valley and Northeastern Railroad. Work began on extending the line toward Amarillo, Texas. The line reached Roswell and Portales in 1894, and connected to the Panhandle and Santa Fe Railroad at Texico. The line opened in 1899.

=== Irrigation projects ===
Hagerman also sought to create farmland out of the New Mexican desert, and transport this produce on his railroad. In early 1890, Hagerman formed the Pecos Irrigation and Improvement Company. On July 1, 1890, this company absorbed the assets of the Pecos Irrigation and Investment Company, revising its charter in order to turn it into a land holding enterprise. Through the new company, Hagerman slowly assumed control of private irrigation project throughout the Pecos Valley.

Hagerman's irrigation company began designing an irrigation system for the entire Pecos Valley. The company built the Avalon Dam on the Pecos River in 1891, creating a six-mile (10 km)-long reservoir. The Avalon Dam's rockfill structure with impervious earthfill facing was the first of its type to be used for irrigation in the United States. It was 45 feet (14 m) high and 1,070 feet (330 m) long at its crest. An irrigation canal paralleling the Pecos River was also built. The canal crossed over the Pecos three miles (4.8 km) south of the dam by a massive 475-foot (145 m) long, 25-foot (7.6 m) wide wooden flume built in 1890. Hagerman's company began building a second dam, the Mcmillan Dam, in 1892. It was nine miles (14 km) upstream from the Avalon site.

In August 1893, flooding washed out the Avalon Dam and the flume across the Pecos River, and damaged the Mcmillan Dam. Despite the economic depression which had hit the nation, Hagerman poured money into reconstruction and repair of the structures, completing the dams in 1894. Similar to the Avalon structure, the McMillan Dam was a rockfill dam, 1,835 feet (559 m) long and 56 feet (17 m) high. The Mcmillan Dam served as a water storage facility, while the Avalon Dam served as a water distribution center for the irrigation system. The Avalon Dam, meanwhile, was raised by five feet and extended by 65 feet (20 m). The flume was also rebuilt.

The irrigation project, however, began to slowly collapse. Hagerman's local business partners sold their interests in the Pecos Irrigation and Improvement Company in 1894. Experiments in growing a number of crops in the region had not met with much success. The company began to hemorrhage money, Hagerman's interest in the project began to wane, and additional financial support was not forthcoming. The company declared bankruptcy in 1898. Another flood washed out the wooden flume the same day. The company was sold to the Pecos Irrigation Company on August 17, 1900. That same year, Hagerman moved from his ranch into the town of Roswell.

== Death ==
J. J. Hagerman's son, Herbert James Hagerman moved to New Mexico shortly thereafter. He worked the Hagerman ranch while his father lived in Roswell. Herbert was named territorial governor of New Mexico in 1906.

Hagerman's health failed toward the end of 1900. He returned to Italy, and died in Milan on September 13, 1909.

J. J. Hagerman is considered one of the most important men in New Mexico history. Along with John Chisum, Charles Eddy and Robert Tansill, Hagerman deeply influenced development of the Carlsbad area. The development of railroads and irrigation in the region would not have occurred nearly as quickly without his financial backing and business acumen. He founded and built up towns and cities, donated large plots of land for public and educational use, and in general is considered one of the 'founders' of modern New Mexico.
