= Hagerman Mansion =

Historic house in Colorado, United States

- U.S. National Register of Historic Places
- Colorado State Register of Historic Properties No. 5EP.548
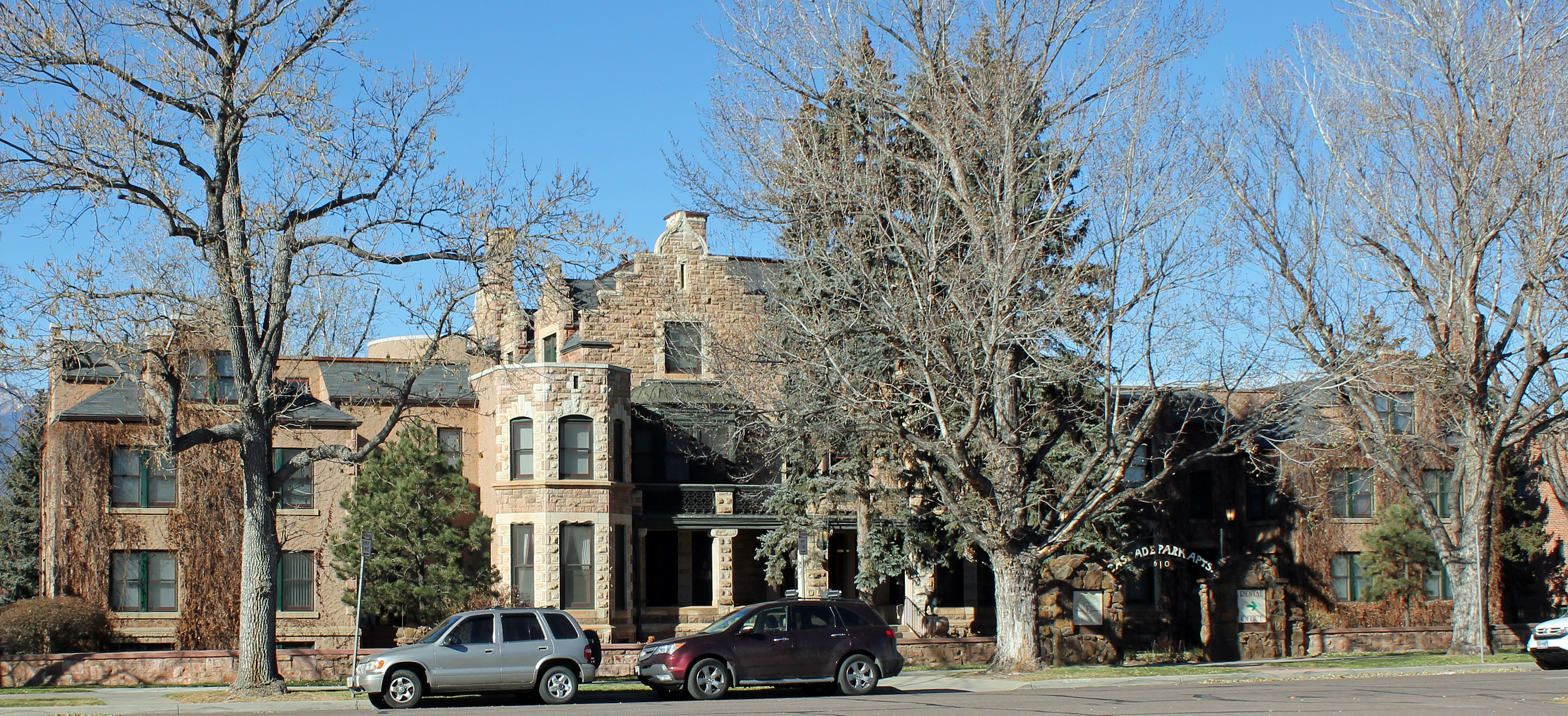

- Location within Colorado
- Location: 610 N. Cascade Avenue
- Coordinates: 38°50′36″N 104°49′32″W
- Built: 1885
- Built by: James John Hagerman
- NRHP reference No.: 84000831
- CSRHP No.: 5EP.548
- Added to NRHP: September 20, 1984

The Hagerman Mansion is a historic house located at 610 North Cascade Avenue in Colorado Springs, Colorado.

== Description and history ==
Built by James John Hagerman in 1885. It was converted into luxury apartments in 1927.

It was added to the National Register of Historic Places on September 20, 1984.
