= Busk–Ivanhoe Tunnel =

Coordinates: 39°15′19″N 106°28′57″W

Busk-Ivanhoe Tunnel
- Interactive map of Busk-Ivanhoe Tunnel

Overview
- Line: Colorado Midland Railroad
- Location: Hagerman Pass, Lake / Pitkin counties, Colorado
- Status: closed to traffic, used as a water tunnel

Operation
- Opened: 1893
- Closed: 1943
- Character: Aqueduct

Technical
- Track length: 9,394 feet (2,863 m)
- Max elevation: 10,953 feet (3,338 m)

Busk–Ivanhoe Tunnel was a 9,394 ft (2,863 m) long railroad tunnel at an elevation of 10,953 ft (3,338 m) in Colorado. It was built by the Busk Tunnel Railway Company for the Colorado Midland Railroad in 1891 as a replacement for the Hagerman Tunnel at a lower, more direct route.

The tunnel was briefly abandoned following Colorado Midland's 1897 bankruptcy, but returned to use a few years later.

It was converted to auto traffic in 1922 as the Carlton Tunnel, a toll tunnel carrying then-State Highway 104, closing in 1942 when the state discontinued maintenance of the road. The tunnel collapsed in 1945.

Starting in 1921, while it was still a highway tunnel, the tunnel was also used as a water diversion tunnel, moving water from Ivanhoe Lake in the Colorado River Basin to Busk Creek in the Arkansas River Basin. After the tunnel collapse, the Highline Canal Company purchased the tunnel, repairing it at a cost of $50,000. The water was originally used for irrigation of agricultural lands in the Arkansas Valley in Southeastern Colorado. The Board of Water Works of Pueblo, Colorado bought half of the water rights in 1971, and the City of Aurora bought most of the remaining rights in 1988.
