= Chemin de fer touristique d'Anse =

CFT Anse - Voie de 38
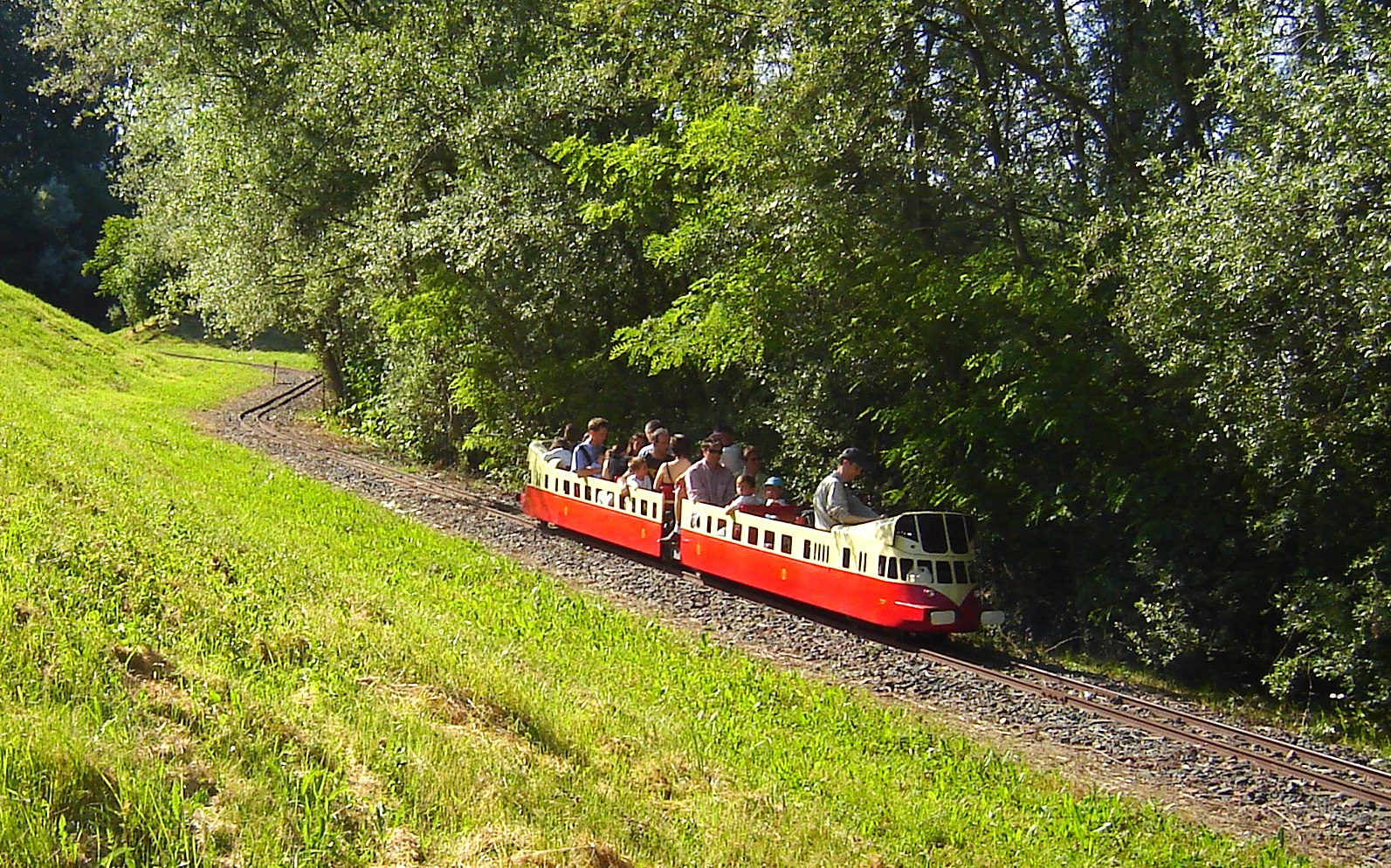
- X131 passing through the hills

Overview
- Locale: France
- Termini: Anse pont; Anse Plage
- Website: http://www.cftanse.fr

History
- Opened: 1968

Technical
- Track gauge: 15 in (381 mm)

The Chemin de fer Touristique d'Anse (also known as Voie de 38) is managed by a French association. It is located in the city center of Anse, in the Rhône department in the Auvergne-Rhône-Alpes region.

It offers journeys of approximately 45 minutes on trains running on a 15 in (381 mm) narrow gauge track. Trains run from April to October, Saturdays, Sundays and some public holidays. The Anse SNCF station is located near the starting point.

== History ==
It was in 1968 that André Chaumeil and Guy Mathan implemented their idea of creating a model train that could carry passengers. They chose the English 1/4 scale, which is the common scale between real train and model making. They built a machine inspired by the SNCF Locomotor Y9201, with the engine of a Renault Dauphine, and a wagon serving as the driver's seat. This first train called “Yoyo” is presented at Francheville on a 300-metre (330 yd) long track installed in the property of a friend of the manufacturers. The following year the route was moved to Trévoux on the banks of the Saône, with a simple verbal agreement from the mayor, its length doubled. That same year 1969, the designers and their friends founded the "Association of Model Railroads on track of 15 in (381 mm) gauge. In 1971, the new mayor refused to renew the agreement and therefore the line had to be moved.

== Association CFT Anse ==
The CFT Anse, is an association law 1901. Its 60 members build, maintain and drive the trains. They do not hesitate to visit the depot and present the material. The depot-workshop is located at 560 route de Saint Bernard in Anse.

=== Line from Anse-Pont to Anse-Plage ===
The rails meander from the heart of the town of Anse to the Colombier lake, where there is a beach and small paths along the Saône. The departure is carried out in main station at Anse-Pont, then the train runs along the Azergues, passes under the bridge SNCF then under that of the highway. After two blasts of the horn, he crossed the access road to the Portes du Beaujolais campsite via a barrier-free level crossing. The rails now thread between small green hills, then the train goes down and it is the passage of the tunnel; after this, he begins the long straight line towards the lake and its beach. A turntable at each end of the line allow locomotives to be turned around. The machinery depot has also been erected in May 2016, for the operation of the locomotives.

=== 1/4 scale trains ===
The trains are approximately 1/4 scale reproductions of real rolling stock: three railcars, one X 4900 (blue and white), one ABV (red and cream) and a TAR, the ancestor of the TGV (metallic gray). These 3 low-bed or tricaisses railcars are motorized with Citroën 2CV engines, with the 2CV mechanical gearbox; a BB type diesel locomotive, motorized with a 2,000 cc (120 cu in)} turbo diesel engine, hydraulic gearbox; a type 131 steam locomotive with separate tender was put into service in the spring of 2016. It was officially named "La Fernande" on September 4, 2016; a Y 9200 type 2-axle shunting tractor, currently powered by a Citroën 2CV engine; three covered passenger cars and three large open wagons; and various Railway track#Maintenanceservice cars: dumpers, two long flat wagons, three ballast tanks and three sedans.

The tourist railway

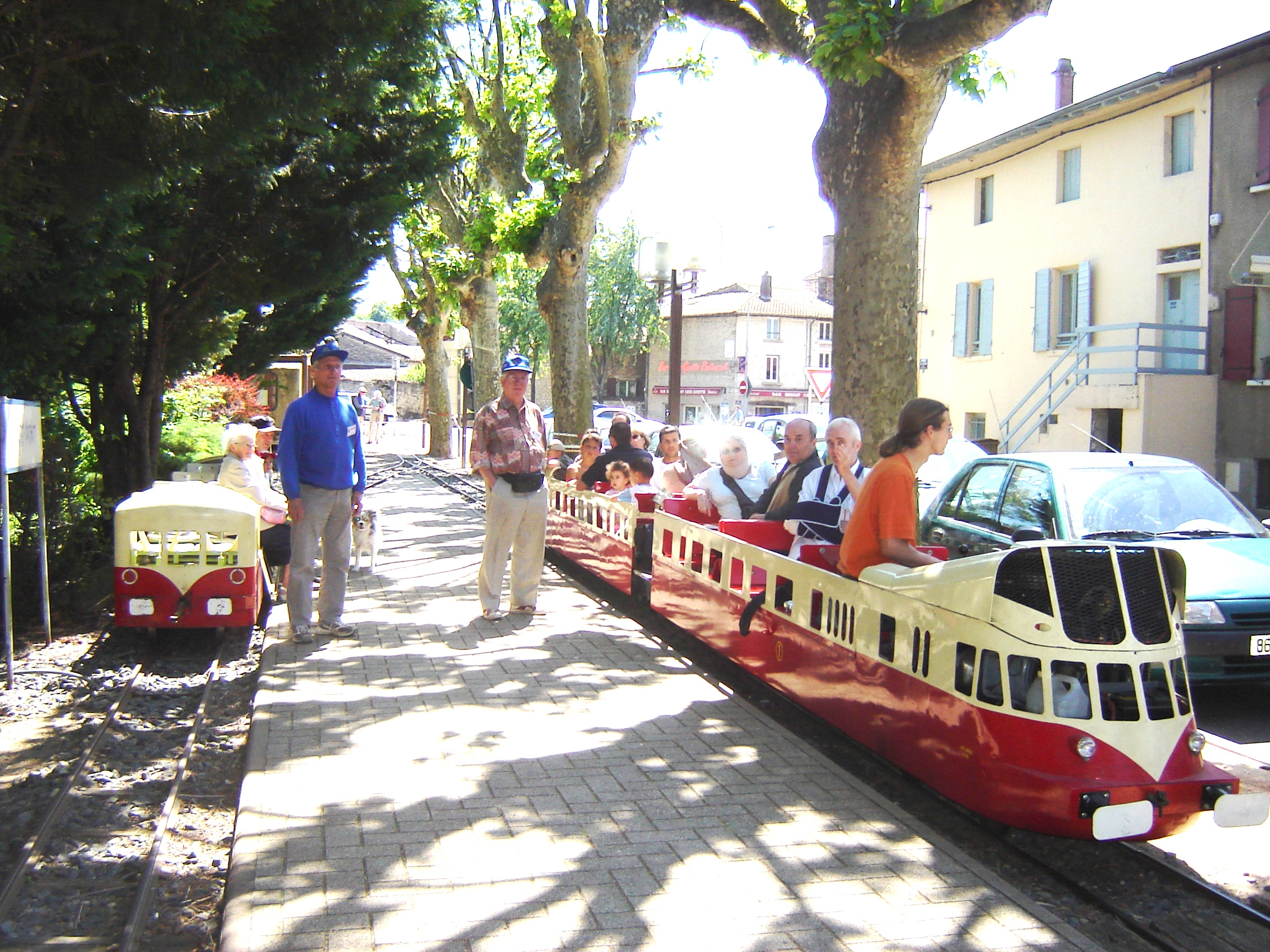
Main station Anse Pont.

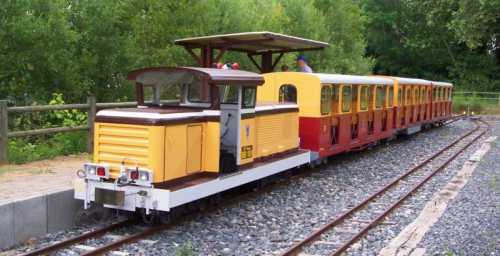
Anse Plage station

== Member of UNECTO ==
The CFT Anse is a member of the Union of Tourist Railways and Museum Operators

== See also ==
=== Related Articles ===
- List of tourist railways in France
- Union of Tourist Railways and Museum Operators
