= 1957 in rail transport =

This article lists events related to rail transport that occurred in 1957.

== Events ==
=== January ===
- January 1 – The Chicago and North Western Railway leases the Chicago, St. Paul, Minneapolis and Omaha Railway (the Omaha Road).
- January 12 – Operations of the Atchison, Topeka & Santa Fe Railway's Super Chief and El Capitan passenger trains are combined during off-peak seasons.
- January 22 – Last day of steam locomotive operations on the Southern Pacific.

=== February ===
- February 7 – Southern Pacific 4-6-2 #2472 (now preserved) is retired from revenue service.

=== March ===
- March 17 – The Milwaukee Road operates its last steam locomotive.
- March 21 – Deutsche Bundesbahn puts in operation its first E 40 locomotive.
- March 29 – The New York, Ontario & Western Railway is abandoned, the largest single railroad abandonment in the United States (541 mi (871 km)).
- March 29 – The Central Vermont Railway dieselized.

=== April ===
- April 7 – New York City trolleys run for the last time.

=== May ===
- May 7 – The Flying Yankee trainset is retired from revenue service on the Boston & Maine and Maine Central railroads.
- May 17 – Canadian National opens a new track alignment between Toronto and Montreal to make way for construction of the St Lawrence Seaway.
- May 24 – The Pacific Electric Bellflower Line ceases operation.

=== June ===
- June 2 – First Trans Europ Express diesel trains run in Europe.
- June 6 – Pere Marquette Railroad steam locomotive 2-8-4 number 1225 is given to Michigan State University for display on campus.

=== July ===
- July 3 – The Chicago Aurora and Elgin Railroad abruptly ceases to carry passengers at 12:13pm.
- July 11 – Southern Pacific's Colton Cutoff around Los Angeles is opened to traffic.
- July 27 – The Musquodoboit Railway ends steam locomotive operations with a round trip between Dartmouth and Upper Upper Musquodoboit, Nova Scotia, behind Canadian National number 3409.

=== August ===
- August 27 – The Atchison, Topeka & Santa Fe Railway retires its last steam locomotive.

=== September ===
- September 1 – 175 die in Jamaica's worst railway disaster.
- September 7 – The Pennsylvania Railroad discontinues the Morning Steeler passenger train between Pittsburgh and Cleveland.
- September 28 – Newtown Tram Depot in Sydney is closed.

=== October ===
- October 6 – The Chicago "L" Stock Yards branch serving Union Stock Yards is closed.
- October 21 – Two trains collide in Turkey; 95 die.
- October 31 – Canadian National receives authorization to operate the former New York Central Railroad (NYC) lines in Ottawa to reach industries that were originally served by NYC.

=== November ===
- November 1 – Class I railroads report they roster 27,108 diesel and 2,697 steam locomotives. An additional 721 steam locomotives are in storage.
- November 15 – A first section of Nagoya Municipal Subway, Nagoya Station to Sakae Station route start operation in Aichi Prefecture, Japan.

=== Unknown date ===
- The WDM-1 locomotives, which were imported from ALCO, became the first mainline diesel locomotives of Indian Railways.
- William N. Deramus III becomes president of the Missouri–Kansas–Texas Railroad.
- Estación Federico Lacroze in Buenos Aires, Argentina, opens.
- The California State Legislature establishes the five-county San Francisco Bay Area Rapid Transit District.
- Pandrol clip patented by Norwegian railway engineer Per Pande Rolfsen.

== Deaths ==
=== March deaths ===
- March 9 – Robert Whitelegg, locomotive superintendent for London, Tilbury and Southend Railway 1910-1912, and for Glasgow & South Western Railway 1918-1923, general manager of Beyer, Peacock & Company 1923-1929, dies (b. 1871).

=== July deaths ===
- July 13 - Sim Webb, Casey Jones' fireman on the famous run (born 1874).
