= Colorado Midland Railway =

Railway

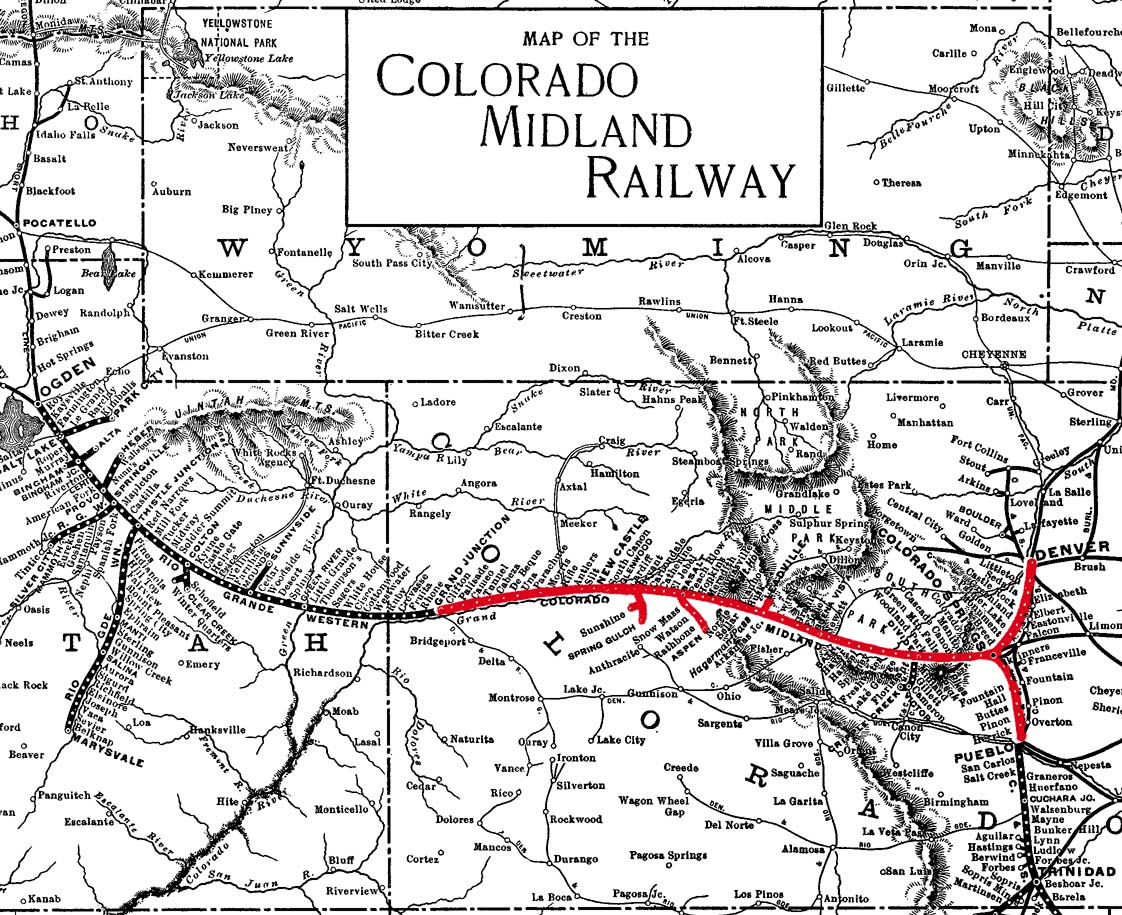
- ca. 1900 map of the Colorado Midland Railway

Overview
- Reporting mark: CM
- Locale: Colorado
- Dates of operation: 1883–1918

Technical
- Track gauge: 4 ft 8 1/2 in (1,435 mm) standard gauge

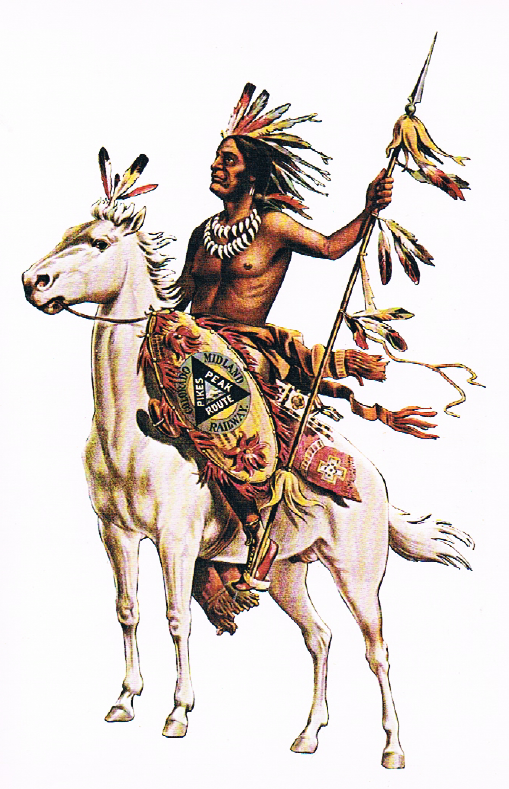
Colorado Midland Railway Ute Chief Advertisement 1910

The Colorado Midland Railway (reporting mark CM), incorporated in 1883, was the first standard gauge railroad built over the Continental Divide in Colorado. It ran from Colorado Springs to Leadville and through the divide at Hagerman Pass to Glenwood Springs and Grand Junction. The sections of the railroad were constructed from east to west; the following table illustrates the proper sequence.

Constructed Section	Start	Finish Date
Manitou to Woodland	July 16, 1886	March 4, 1887
Woodland to Florrisant	July 31, 1886	March 23, 1887
Florissant to Spinney	August 1, 1886	April 9, 1887
Spinney to Hartsel	September 27, 1887	April 24, 1887
Hartsel to Hill Top	September 1, 1886	May 6, 1887
Hill Top to Leadville	September 21, 1886	August 29, 1887
Leadville to Nast	May 17, 1886	September 23, 1887
Nast to Reudi	August 7, 1886	September 27, 1887
Reudi to Basalt	April 19, 1886	October 18, 1887
Basalt to Glenwood Springs	April 22, 1886	December 18, 1887

== History ==
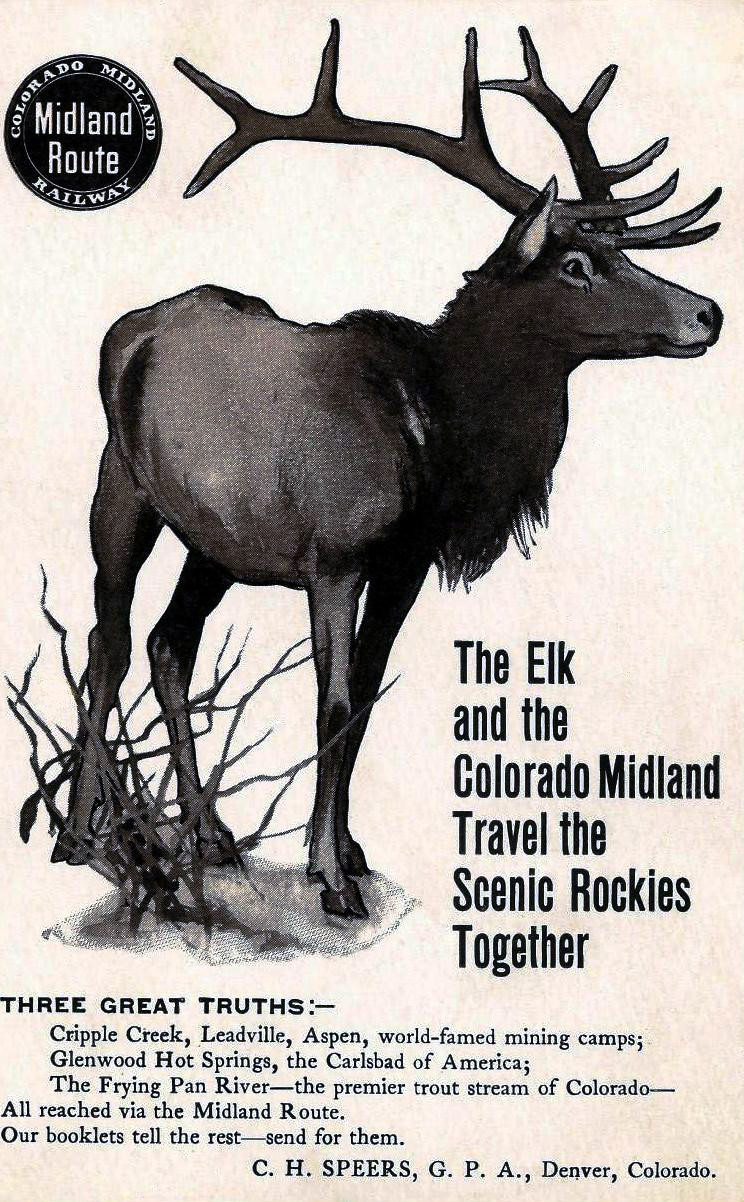
Circa early 1900s postcard ad for the line.

John J. Hagerman gained control of the Colorado Midland Railway Company in June 1885. In September 1890, Hagerman sold the railroad to the Atchison, Topeka and Santa Fe Railway, which operated the railroad as a subsidiary and changed the name to the Colorado Midland Railroad.

The Colorado Midland Railway’s advertising frequently drew on imagery associated with Colorado history. One such emblem, depicting a Ute man on horseback, referencing Ute Pass, a route historically used by the Ute people between South Park and the Manitou Springs area. The emblem was used by the railroad from its early years until about 1910.

For a short time the railroad was consolidated with the Aspen Short Line (1893-1897). Following the Panic of 1893, the Santa Fe railroad failed and both it and the Colorado Midland went into receivership. During this time, a crash in the price of silver also led to economic decline in the mining towns served by the railway.

After the company was sold through the bankruptcy court on May 4, 1897, a new company known as the Colorado Midland Railway took over operation of the railroad. It then came under the joint control of the Colorado and Southern Railway and the Denver and Rio Grande Railroad in 1900. It again declared bankruptcy April 21, 1917, and was sold at auction to Albert E. Carlton of Colorado Springs. Carlton attempted to revive the railroad's fortunes, but his stewardship of the road coincided with the entry of the United States into the First World War. After the inauguration of the United States Railroad Administration in late 1917, the government managers redirected much of the trans-Colorado traffic that was previously carried by other railroads onto the Midland, which was ill-equipped to deal with the sudden upturn in business. The traffic overwhelmed the railroad, and when it became apparent that the Midland was incapable of dealing with the volume of business, the government redirected all of it elsewhere. Business dropped off precipitately, and Carleton was forced to apply for permission to abandon operations. He received it, and the Colorado Midland Railway ceased operations in 1918. The company had defaulted on mortgage bond payments due in January and July and went into receivership. On August 3, 1918, Judge Sheafor of the district court in Colorado Springs denied attempts by the State Public Utilities Commission, the Attorney General’s representative, and counsel for Park County residents to delay the bankruptcy, and ordered A. E. Carlton to cease operations and sell the assets at fair market value. Segments of the railroad were then sold to the Midland Terminal Railway; the rest of the line, mostly west of the Midland Terminal connection at Divide, was abandoned. The line was scrapped in the early 1920s.

Much of the line’s grade was incorporated into the modern day U.S. Route 24 in Colorado, in particular the section from Colorado Springs to Buena Vista.

== Topography and operations ==
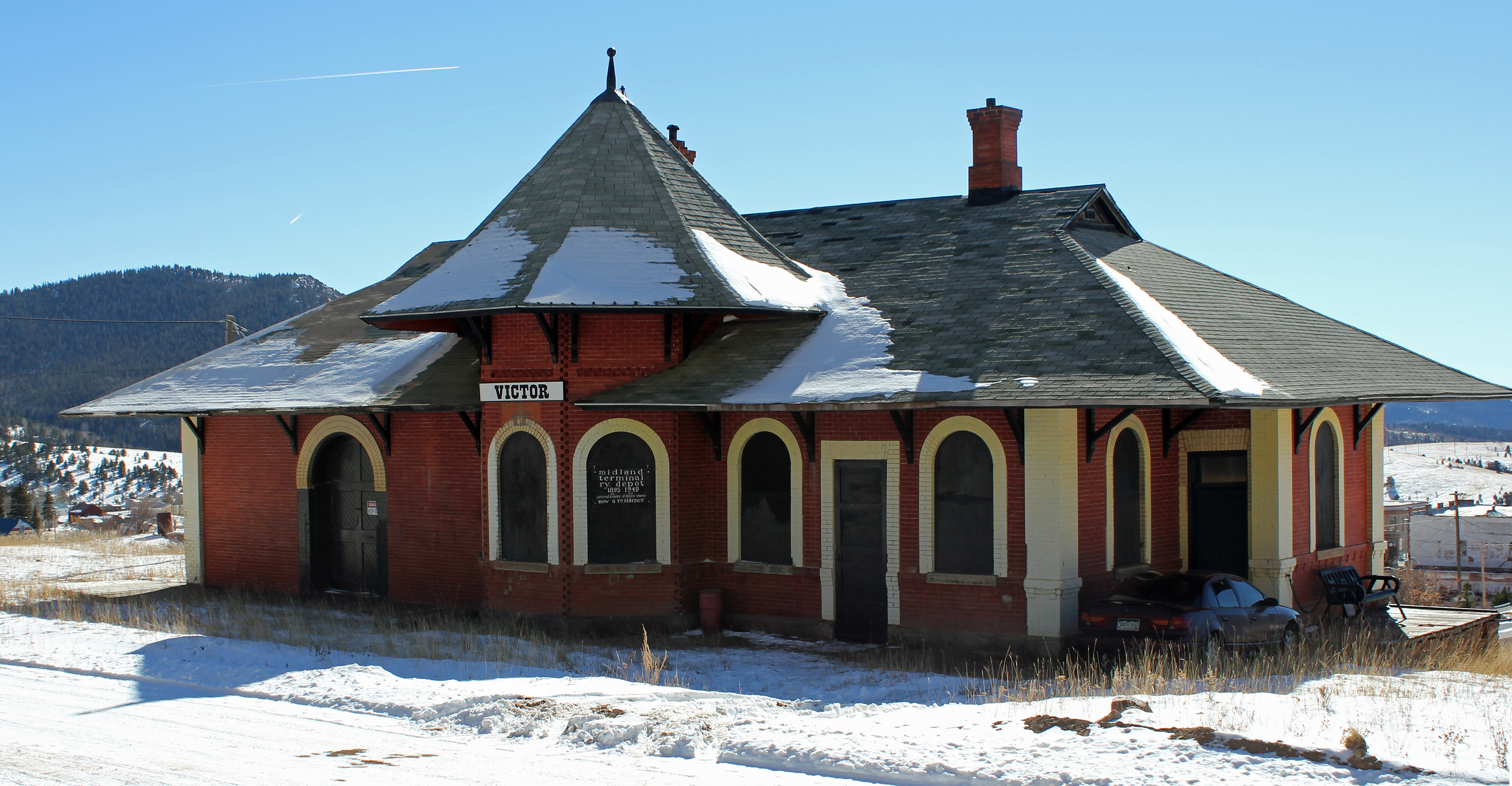
Midland Terminal Railroad Depot, Victor, Colorado

The Midland (as it was colloquially known) was an extraordinarily difficult railroad to operate, in large part because it had very little level track. In crossing Colorado, the line made three summits – at Hayden Divide, west of Colorado Springs, at Trout Creek Pass, and at Hagerman Pass on the Continental Divide. The Hagerman Tunnel was completed in 1887. In 1891, it was replaced by the Busk-Ivanhoe Tunnel which was at a lower altitude. This shortened the line and made the grade easier, but the approaches to these summits were severe: eastbound trains faced an ascent of about twenty miles of three percent grades in the climb from Basalt to the western portal of the tunnel at Ivanhoe; westbound trains climbing out of the Arkansas River Valley faced a shorter but still difficult climb of 3.24%. The ascent from Colorado Springs to Divide was also severe, with several stretches of 4% grade and significant curvature.

The portion of the line from Leadville to Hagerman Pass provided the setting for some of the finest railroad imagery ever taken. Especially noteworthy was the work of W. H. Jackson, particularly the photos circa 1890 showing the rise over five levels and the massive wood trestle leading to the final tier.

Even after the boring of the Busk-Ivanhoe Tunnel, much of this trackage was above nine thousand feet, in a district of Colorado where the snow often does not melt entirely until June. The railroad was difficult to operate at the best of times, and in winter it was often nearly impossible: the 1899 blizzard closed the line over Hagerman Pass for 77 days and cost the company more than $73,000 (approx $2 million in 2013).

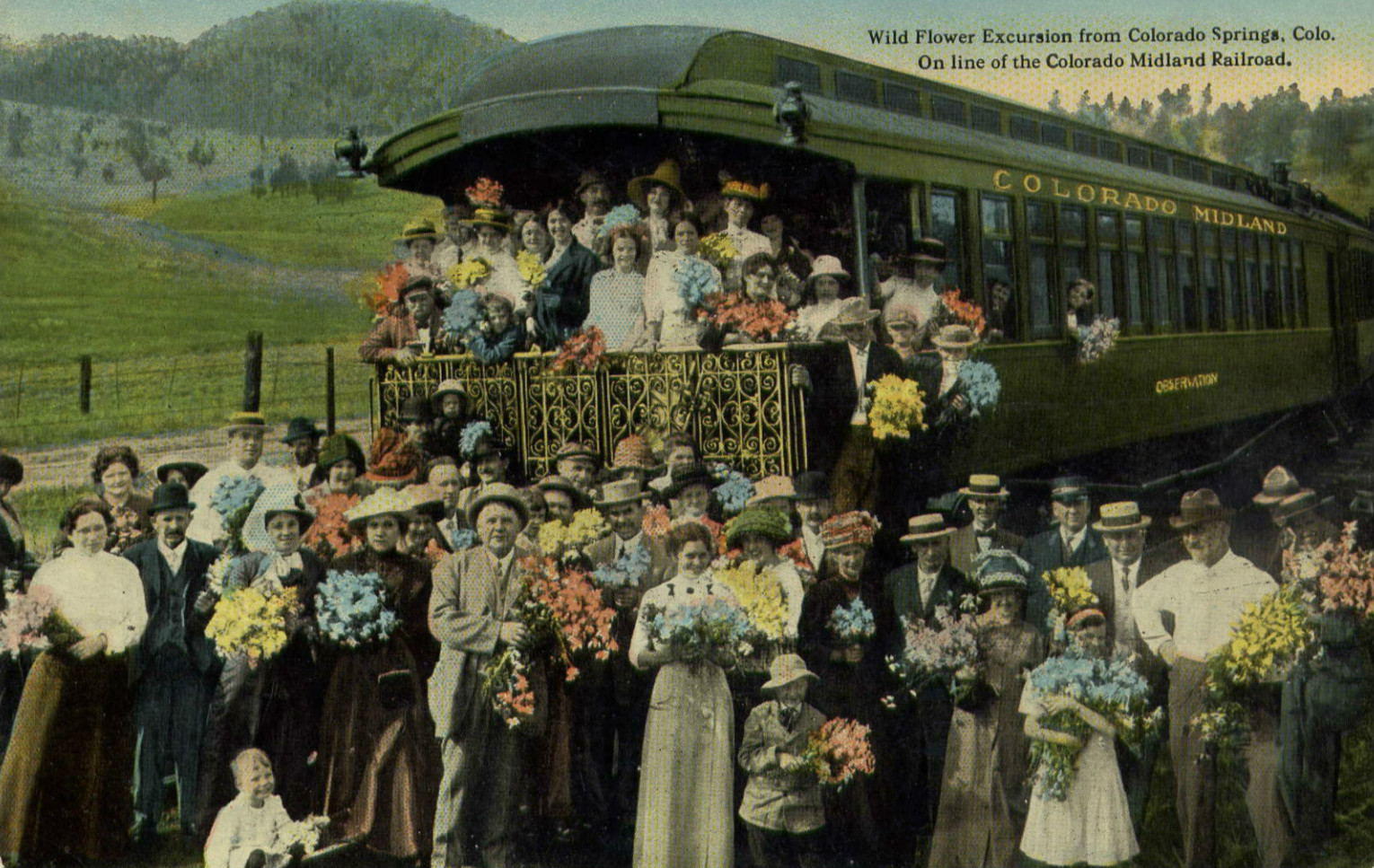
Wild flower excursion from Colorado Springs, 1917.

As great a problem as topography was, the route and terminals posed a still greater one. The line was originally projected to connect Colorado Springs, Leadville, and Salt Lake City, Utah, but it eventually stopped at Grand Junction, Colorado. If the line had been extended to Salt Lake City it would have had access to connections with the Union Pacific and Southern Pacific at Ogden, but at Grand Junction, it connected only with the Denver & Rio Grande, its principal competitor for traffic at Leadville and Colorado Springs. While the Midland had no choice but to turn over westbound traffic to the D&RGW at Grand Junction, the competing line had no such incentive; it could move eastbound traffic over its own line to any spot the Midland served. When A.E. Carleton bought the CM, he planned to remedy this situation by extending the railroad across Utah to Salt Lake City, but he was unable to do so, relying instead on his business connections to obtain cars consigned for shipment east at Grand Junction.

Ironically, the situation reversed itself abruptly after the government took control of the railroads, and the USRA decided to route all trans-Colorado traffic onto the Midland. The railroad suddenly found itself handling a swelling volume of interchange traffic at Colorado Springs and Grand Junction. The line had neither the motive power nor the physical facilities to deal with this sudden change, and yards and even on-line sidings rapidly filled with cars waiting movement to one of the terminals. After an investigation, the government reversed its decision, redirecting through traffic to neighboring lines that were more capable of handling it; this was a wise decision, but the business generated by the road's on-line customers was not sufficient to keep it profitable without through traffic, and Carleton was compelled to seek permission from a court to abandon service in the summer of 1918.

== Equipment ==
At the time of its construction, the Midland was among the best-appointed roads in the United States. Ten of the locomotives it purchased in 1886 and 1887 (the Class 115 2-8-0s) were among the largest and most powerful of their type in the United States. Unfortunately, the Midland's cash situation militated against capital replacement, and most of the locomotives purchased in the road's first decade were still on the property when it closed in 1918. The Midland purchased its last locomotives, the Class 175 2-8-0s, in 1907; after that, the purchase of new power fell behind ordinary operations and maintenance expenses on the company's priority list, and was postponed in part because of concerns about the ability of the roadbed and track to support heavier equipment. At the outbreak of the First World War, the road's chief mechanical officer proposed the immediate construction of a new class of engines to handle the surging traffic, but the state of the road's physical plant (which urgently needed both maintenance and upgrading) was such that he limited his proposal to a copy of the D&RGW's C-48 class locomotives, a design that was thirteen years old and approaching obsolescence.

Locomotives
Numbers	Class	Builder	SN	Type	Built
1-3	Class 115	Schenectady Locomotive Works	2225-2227	2-8-0	1886
4-10	Class 115	Schenectady Locomotive Works	2228-2234	2-8-0	1887
11-13	Class 102	Schenectady Locomotive Works	2235-2236,2417	4-6-0	1887
14-22	Class 104	Schenectady Locomotive Works	2418,2239-2246	4-6-0	1887
23-25	Class 93	Schenectady Locomotive Works	2309-2311	4-6-0	1887
26-28	Class 102	Schenectady Locomotive Works	2419-2421	4-6-0	1888
29-38	Class 102	Baldwin Locomotive Works	9206,9209,9208,9210,9215,9217,9298,9300,9302	4-6-0	1888
39-44	Class 102	Schenectady Locomotive Works	2925-2930	4-6-0	1889
45-48	Class 102	Schenectady Locomotive Works	3261-3264	4-6-0	1890
49-53	Class 136	Baldwin Locomotive Works	15130-15134	2-8-0	1897
100-102	Class 91	Schenectady Locomotive Works	2309-2311	0-6-0	1887
201-205	Class 159	Baldwin Locomotive Works	18631-18632,18646=18648	2-8-0	1897
301-306	Class 175	Baldwin Locomotive Works	32124-32127,32151-32152	2-8-0	1907
