= 1951 in rail transport =

This article lists events related to rail transport that occurred in 1951.

== Events ==
=== January ===
- January – Fairbanks-Morse and Canadian Locomotive Company introduce the H-16-66 diesel locomotive.
- January 10 – Two Southern Pacific trainmen are killed at Wendel, California, when their engine hits a flat car, killing them instantly; the engine then travels in reverse for 8 miles before derailing with the dead men inside.
- January 11 – The San Diego and Arizona Eastern Railway discontinues passenger train service.
- January 20 – Canadian Pacific Railway's eastbound The Dominion passenger train hits a truck at a level crossing in Ottawa; most of the train remains on the rails, but the engineer is fatally burned in the derailment.
- January 31 – The last daily narrow gauge passenger train in the United States, the San Juan Express, is retired by the Denver and Rio Grande Western Railroad.

=== February ===
- February 6 – The Woodbridge train wreck, The Broker, a Pennsylvania Railroad passenger train derails near Woodbridge Township, New Jersey killing 85 people and injuring over 500 more.
- February 25 – The Milwaukee-Dearborn subway (3.85 miles/6.0 km), Chicago's second subway route, is placed in operation by the CTA. With stations at Division, Chicago, Grand, Lake Transfer, Washington, Monroe, Jackson, and LaSalle.

=== March ===
- March 16 – The Doncaster rail crash in England kills 14.

=== April ===
- April 14 – Southern Railway (India) created as the first zone of Indian Railways by merger of South Indian Railway, Madras and Southern Mahratta Railway and Mysore State Railway.
- April 20 – In Tokyo, Japan, construction begins on the Marunouchi Line between Ikebukuro and Shinjuku.
- April 24 – Sakuragichō train fire in Japan kills 106.
- April 30 – Huntly rail bridge bombing in New Zealand: a bridge is dynamited to disrupt coal supplies during an industrial dispute.

=== May ===
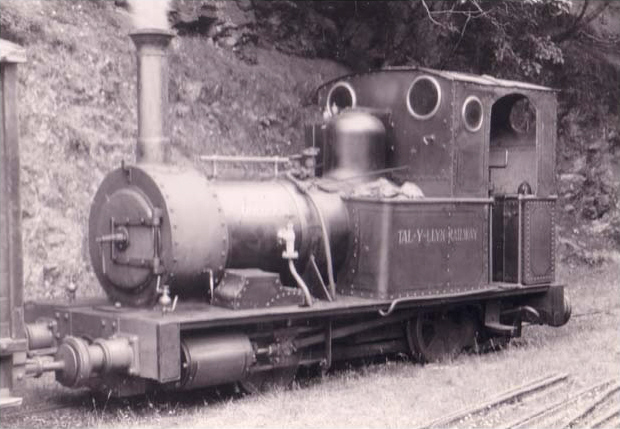
Talyllyn Railway No. 2 Dolgoch at Abergynolwyn in 1951

- May 3 – General Motors Electro-Motive Division produces its first six-axle freight diesel locomotive, an SD7. It tours as demonstrator number 990 before being sold to the Southern Pacific Railroad, which numbers it 1518. It is preserved at the Illinois Railway Museum.
- May 10 – SNCF introduces an experimental 50 Hz electrification scheme, initially at 20 kV, on the railway between Aix-les-Bains and La Roche-sur-Foron in south-eastern France.
- May 14 – Talyllyn Railway (Wales) reopened by Talyllyn Railway Preservation Society, generally reckoned to be the first such voluntary body to operate a railway.

=== June ===
- June 3 – The Great Northern Railway revamps its Chicago–Pacific Northwest service: the Empire Builder receives new equipment, while its old equipment equips a new passenger train, the Western Star.
- June 7 – A commuter train collides with a truck carrying gasoline at a level crossing at Nova Iguaçu in northwestern Rio de Janeiro, Brazil, killing at least 54.

=== July ===
- July 22 – At Tatranská Lomnica, Czechoslovakia, in the Tatra Mountains, two ČSD passenger cars collide; 19 are killed.

=== August ===
- The direction on station Finlyandsky Rail Terminal to Zelenogorsk station in Saint Petersburg Railway Division of the Oktyabrskaya Railway, Russia has been electrified. In 1 hour and 30 minutes electric power dispatcher gave command to bring the current in the contact network. In 1 hour 50 minutes en route to a trial trip off the first electric train.
- August 23 – The Cangkring (near Cirebon, Indonesia) train station is destroyed by fire.
- August 24 – GM1, the first mainline diesel-electric locomotive built in Australia, begins road trials prior to entering service with Commonwealth Railways on September 20. The locomotive, built by Clyde Engineering of Granville, New South Wales, is adapted by Fred Shea from the EMD F7 design with A1A-A1A bogie configuration.
- August 26 – Railroad operations across Canada are standardized with the introduction of the Uniform Code of Operating Rules.
- August 28 – The last mainline train leaves Berlin, Germany's, Lehrter Bahnhof headed for the Wustermark and Nauen.

=== September ===
- September 6 – Lehigh Valley Transit Company announces replacement of its Philadelphia Division operations by buses effective the next day.
- September 12 – Baldwin-Lima-Hamilton Corporation brings its last railroad locomotive out of the Lima, Ohio, factory, a 2,500 horsepower (1,900 kW) transfer diesel, Pennsylvania Railroad number 5683.
- September 21 – A rail crash in Weedon in England kills 15 people.
- September 30 – Rail service ends on the Pacific Electric Pasadena Short Line and Monrovia–Glendora Line.

=== October ===
- October 1 – The former Blane Valley Railway line, now operated by British Railways, is closed to passenger traffic.
- October 26 – Quebec Railway Light and Power Company sells its Montmorency division, 26 miles (42 km) of track between Quebec City and St. Joachim, to Canadian National Railway.

=== November ===
- November 5 – Western Railway (India) created as a zone of Indian Railways by merger of the Bombay, Baroda, and Central India Railway with the Saurashtra, Rajputana and Jaipur railways; Central Railway created by merger of the Great Indian Peninsular Railway with local state railways.
- November 21 – The isolated Ramal Ferro Industrial Eva Perón (RFIEP) 750 mm gauge railway opens in the southern Patagonian Desert of Argentina to carry coal from Río Turbio for shipping from Río Gallegos, Santa Cruz, originally using Henschel 2-8-2 steam locomotives of 1922 for the main haul.

=== December ===
- December 17 – The Rock Island Railroad converts all of its Chicago-area commuter trains to diesel locomotive power. Seventeen new units replace the 23 Pacific type steam locomotives previously used.
- December 31 – Common-carrier rail service on Cyprus ends.

=== Unknown date ===
- Southern Pacific Railroad subsidiary Sud Pacifico de Mexico is sold to the Mexican government.
- Train service ends on Ferrocarril Mexicano's narrow gauge Córdoba branch.
- The New York, New Haven and Hartford Railroad's streamlined Comet passenger trainset (built in 1935) is retired from revenue service and scrapped.
- Armand Mercier steps down from the presidency of the Southern Pacific Company, parent company of the Southern Pacific Railroad.
- Earnest E. Norris is succeeded by Harry A. deButts as president of the Southern Railway.

== Deaths ==
=== March deaths ===
- March 2 - Edgar Alcock, general manager and chairman of Hunslet Engine Company (born 1877).

=== July deaths ===
- July 10 - Charles E. Johnston, president of Kansas City Southern Railway 1928-1938 (born 1881).
