= SNCF Class BB 63500 =

SNCF BB 63500
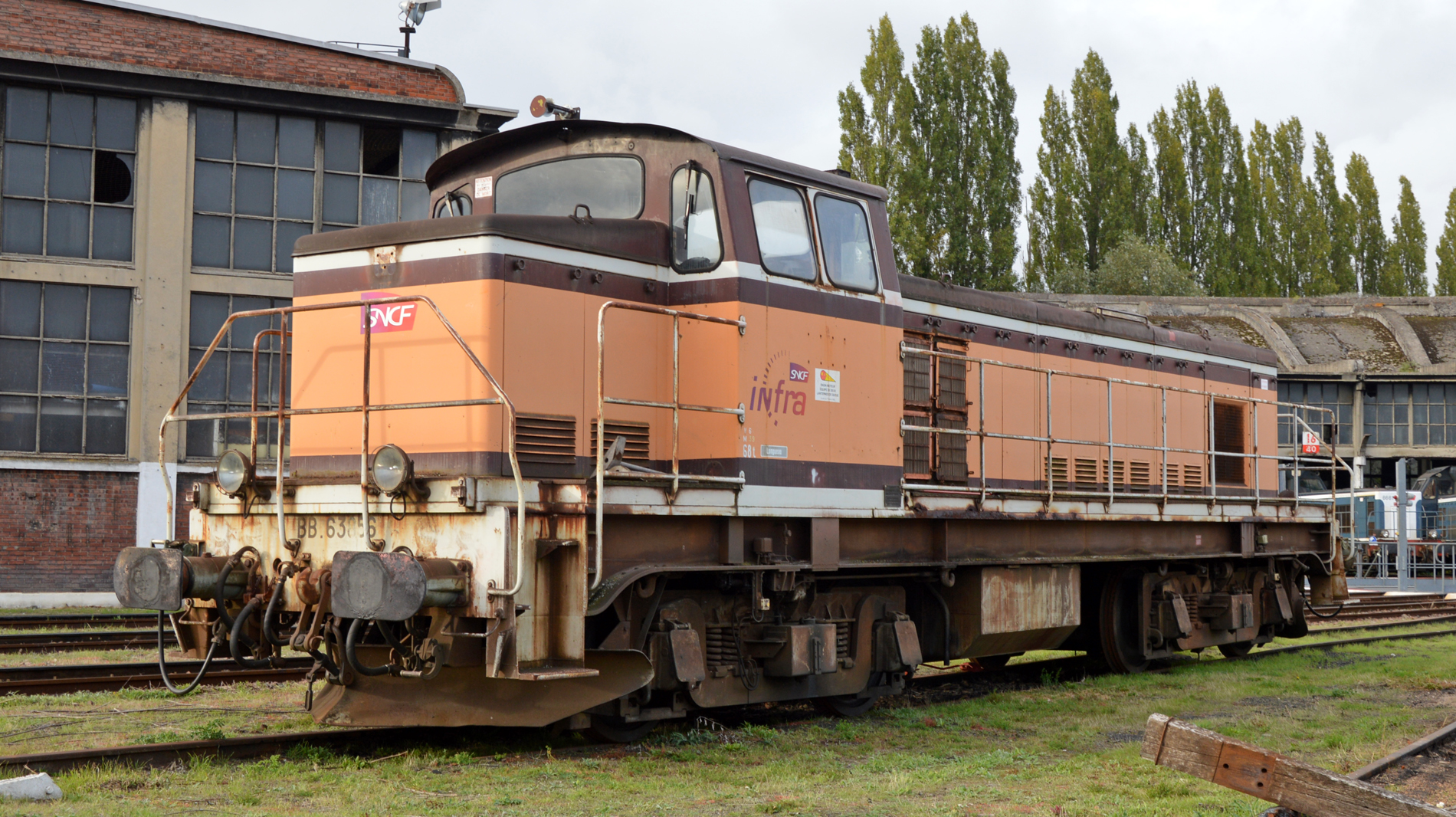
- BB 63856 at Longueau in 2019
Type and origin
- Power type: Diesel-electric
- Builder: Brissonneau et Lotz
- Build date: 1956–1971
- Total produced: 580
Specifications
- Configuration
  - AAR: Bo–Bo
  - Commonwealth: Bo-Bo
- Gauge: 1,435 mm (4 ft 8 1/2 in) standard gauge
- Bogies: 2
- Wheel diameter: 1,050 mm (41 in)
- Length: 14.68 m (48.2 ft)
- Loco weight: 64–68 t (63–67 long tons; 71–75 short tons)
- Fuel type: Diesel
- Prime mover: MGO V12SH
Performance figures
- Maximum speed: 80 km/h (50 mph)
- Power output: 605 kW (811 hp)
- Tractive effort: 167 kN (38,000 lb_{f})
Career
- Operators: SNCF
- Number in class: 580
- Numbers: 63501–64080
- Nicknames: 2 CV du rail

The SNCF Class BB 63500 are a class of centre cab diesel locomotives built for SNCF between 1956 and 1971 by Brissonneau & Lotz. They are a slightly more powerful version of the BB 63400. A total of 580 locomotives were built. Four units, numbers BB 63896, BB 63901, BB 63902 and BB 63906, were equipped with electric train heating and based at La Plaine for operating trip workings of passenger trains between Paris Gare du Nord and Paris Gare de Lyon round the Petit Ceinture. Three batches, numbered BB 63721–BB 63750, BB 63811–BB 63855 and BB 63981–BB 64020, totalling 115 locomotives, were equipped for multiple working.

== Current Use ==
Between 1998 and 1992, a number of locomotives were rebuilt into "master and slave" units. The 25 pairs are designated as class 464800, and are operated by SNCF Logistics.

Though large numbers have been withdrawn in recent years, the survivors are operated by SNCF Infra, 27 locomotives with the prefix 6 added to their numbers, 16 by SNCF Intercités, with the prefix 1 added to their numbers, 3 by SNCF TER, with the prefix 5 added to their numbers, and 3 by SNCF CMR. The last three, BB 63624, BB 64061 and BB 64066, are dedicated to the movement of withdrawn vehicles.

== Preservation ==
BB 63529 is at the Chemin de Fer Charente-Limousine

BB 63813 is at the Chemin de fer de la vallée de l'Eure

BB 63816 and BB 63924 were acquired by the Tourist Railway of Haut-Quercy.

BB 63852 is on the Aa Valley Tourist Railway (CFTVA).

040 DE 895 (ex BB 63895) is preserved at the Train à Vapeur en Limousin.
