= 1943 in rail transport =

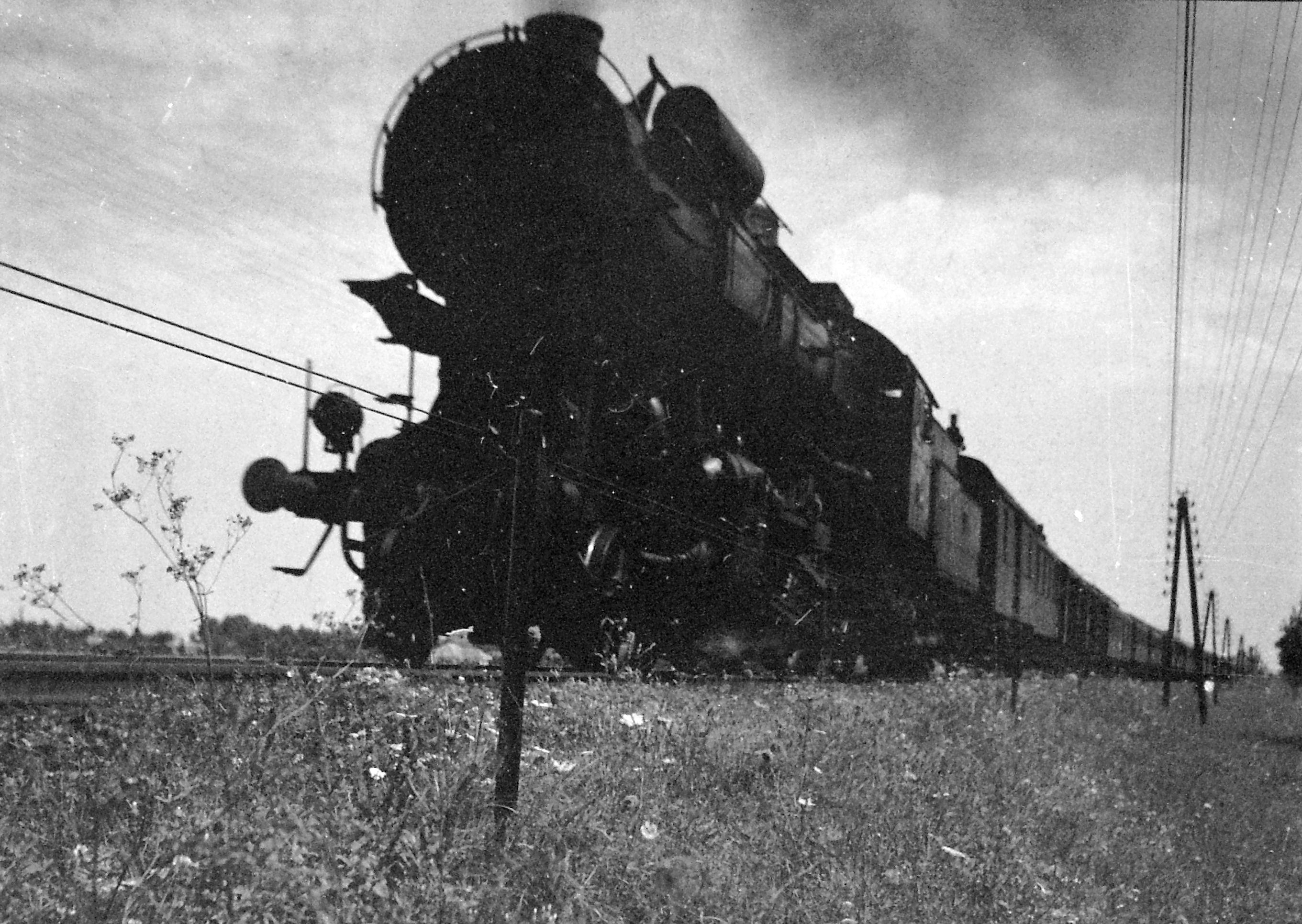
A Hungarian steam locomotive in 1943.

This article lists events related to rail transport that occurred in 1943.

== Events ==
=== January events ===
- January 1 – First Hunslet Austerity 0-6-0ST steamed, earliest of 377 built for war service to British Ministry of Supply order.
- January 16 – First WD Austerity 2-8-0 handed over to British Ministry of Supply, earliest of 935 built for war service.

=== April events ===
- April 2 – Yaga Station in 5-chōme, Yaga, Higashi-ku, Hiroshima, Hiroshima Prefecture, Japan, reopens.

=== May events ===
- May 5 – Pullman, retooled from passenger car construction to work for World War II, launches its first ship built for the Navy, a PCE (patrol craft).
- After a year of revenue service, Union Pacific Railroad's M-10002 streamliner trainset is removed from service; its power car is separated from its unpowered cars and the components are reused elsewhere.

=== June events ===
- June 4 – Hyde railway accident, New Zealand: Train derails at speed in a curved cutting, 21 killed, 47 injured.
- June 21 – British saboteurs blow up the strategically significant railway viaduct at Asopos in Greece.

=== July events ===
- July 14 – Canadian National Railway opens Central Station in Montreal.

=== August events ===
- August 25 – Denver, South Park and Pacific Railroad operates its last regular narrow gauge train on the section between Leadville and Climax.
- August 30 – The Lackawanna Limited wreck at Wayland, New York causes 29 deaths and injures 114 others.

=== September events ===
- September 6 – Frankford Junction train wreck, Seventy-nine people are killed when the Pennsylvania Railroad's Congressional Limited derails due to a burned out journal at Frankford Junction, Pennsylvania.

=== October events ===
- October 4 - The last Maine narrow gauge (the Monson Railroad) discontinues service.
- October 17
  - Chicago's first rapid transit subway route, State Street subway (4.9 miles/7.9 km), opens for passenger service. with stations at North/Clybourn, Clark/Division, Chicago, Grand, Washington, Monroe, Jackson, Harrison, and Roosevelt. It contains one of the world's longest underground station platform – 3,300 feet (1,000 m) long.
  - Completion of the Burma Railway between Bangkok, Thailand and Rangoon, Burma (now Myanmar) (415 km (258 mi)) by the Empire of Japan to support its forces in the Burma campaign using the forced labour of Asian civilians and Allied Prisoners of war.

=== November events ===
- November 11 – Shin-Koyasu Station on what is now JR East's Keihin-Tōhoku Line in Kanagawa-ku, Yokohama, Japan, is opened.

=== December events ===
- December 16 – Two Atlantic Coast Line passenger trains collide after a broken rail derails the first one, putting it in the path of the second. Seventy-one people are killed, most of them U.S. troops.
- The first troop sleepers enter service on U.S. railroads.

=== Unknown date events ===
- The Anton Anderson Memorial Tunnel, the longest combined rail/highway tunnel in North America, opens for railroad service.
- After a few years of only producing diesel engines for the United States Navy during World War II, General Motors Electro-Motive Division returns to manufacturing railroad locomotives.
- The last PRR GG1 to be built is completed.
- Electrification between Limoges and Montauban on the SNCF in Vichy France completes an electrified rail route from Paris to the Mediterranean.

== Births ==
=== September births ===
- September 7 – Chris Green, British railway manager.

== Deaths ==
=== February deaths ===
- February 9 – Walter Kidde, president of New York, Susquehanna and Western Railway 1937–1943 (born 1877).
- February 11 – Stuart R. Knott, president of Kansas City Southern Railway 1900–1905 (born 1859).

=== June deaths ===
- June 2 – John Frank Stevens, chief engineer and general manager of Great Northern Railway, vice president Chicago, Rock Island and Pacific Railroad (born 1853).
