= 1928 in rail transport =

This article lists events related to rail transport that occurred in 1928.

== Events ==
=== January events ===
- January 5 – Bombay, Baroda and Central India Railway opens its Bombay suburban electrified system on 1.5 kV DC.
- January 13 – Henry Clay Hall leaves the Interstate Commerce Commission upon the appointment of his successor.

=== April events ===
- April 10 – Takagimachi Station, in Matsushima, Miyagi, Japan, opens.

=== May events ===
- May 1 – The London and North Eastern Railway's Flying Scotsman steam-hauled express train begins to run non-stop over the 393 miles (632 km) of the British East Coast Main Line from London King's Cross to Edinburgh Waverley using LNER Gresley Class A1 4-6-2s with tenders fitted with gangway connections to permit a crew change en route; 4472 Flying Scotsman takes the first northbound train.

=== June events ===
- June 13 - The first tests are performed with the first rail detector car, invented by Elmer Ambrose Sperry, in Beacon, New York.
- June 27 - Darlington rail crash on the London and North Eastern Railway in England: Two trains collide head-on at Darlington Bank Top railway station in County Durham following a signal passed at danger; 25 killed.
- June 28 - The International Railway (New York–Ontario) switches to one-man crews for its trolleys in Canada.

=== July events ===
- July 10 - Shin-Koiwa Station in Katsushika, Tokyo, Japan, opens.
- July 18 - Official opening of the Pau–Canfranc railway line as a trans-Pyreneen route between France and Spain, and of Canfranc International Railway Station in Aragon.

=== September events ===
- September 1
  - Frontier Mail express passenger service between Colaba Terminus (Bombay) and Peshawar inaugurated by Bombay, Baroda and Central India Railway.
  - The Philadelphia Broad Street Line begins service between City Hall and Olney Avenue.
- September 22 - Canadian Premier John Bracken drives the last spike on Canadian National Railway's line between Flin Flon and Cranberry Portage, Manitoba.
- September 28 - Third class sleeping cars are introduced on those British railways providing such a service.

=== October events ===
- October 13 – Charfield railway disaster: London, Midland and Scottish Railway night mail train crashes into shunting goods train following signal passed at danger at Charfield in the English county of Gloucestershire: 16 killed.
- October 15 – The Loenga–Alnabru Line in Norway introduces electric traction.

=== November events ===
- November 1 - New Keihan Railway Line, Tenjinbashisuji-Rokuchome Station of Osaka to Sanin station of Kyoto route officially completed in Japan (as predecessor of Hankyu Kyoto Line).
- November 15 - Nara Electronic Railway Line, Kyōto Station to Yamato-Saidaiji Station of Nara route officially completed in Japan (as predecessor of Kintetsu Kyoto Line).
- November 28
  - After both the eastbound and westbound passenger trains depart, a fire is discovered in the Grand Trunk Pacific Railway's Wainwright, Alberta, station; due to problems with the local fire truck, the station is completely destroyed in the blaze.
  - In Gunma Prefecture, Japan, the Jomo Electric Railway opens for service connecting Chūō-Maebashi Station and Nishi-Kiryū Station.
- November 29 - The last trains on Pacific Great Eastern Railway's (predecessor of British Columbia Railway) Vancouver-Horseshoe Bay line are run.
- The Merchants Despatch purchases the Northern Refrigerator Car Line (founded by Milwaukee's Cudahy brothers) and its 1,800 cars.

=== December events ===
- December – Great Western Railway of England commences series production at its Swindon Works of ’Hall’ Class 4-6-0 steam locomotives, of which there will eventually be 339.

=== Unknown date events ===
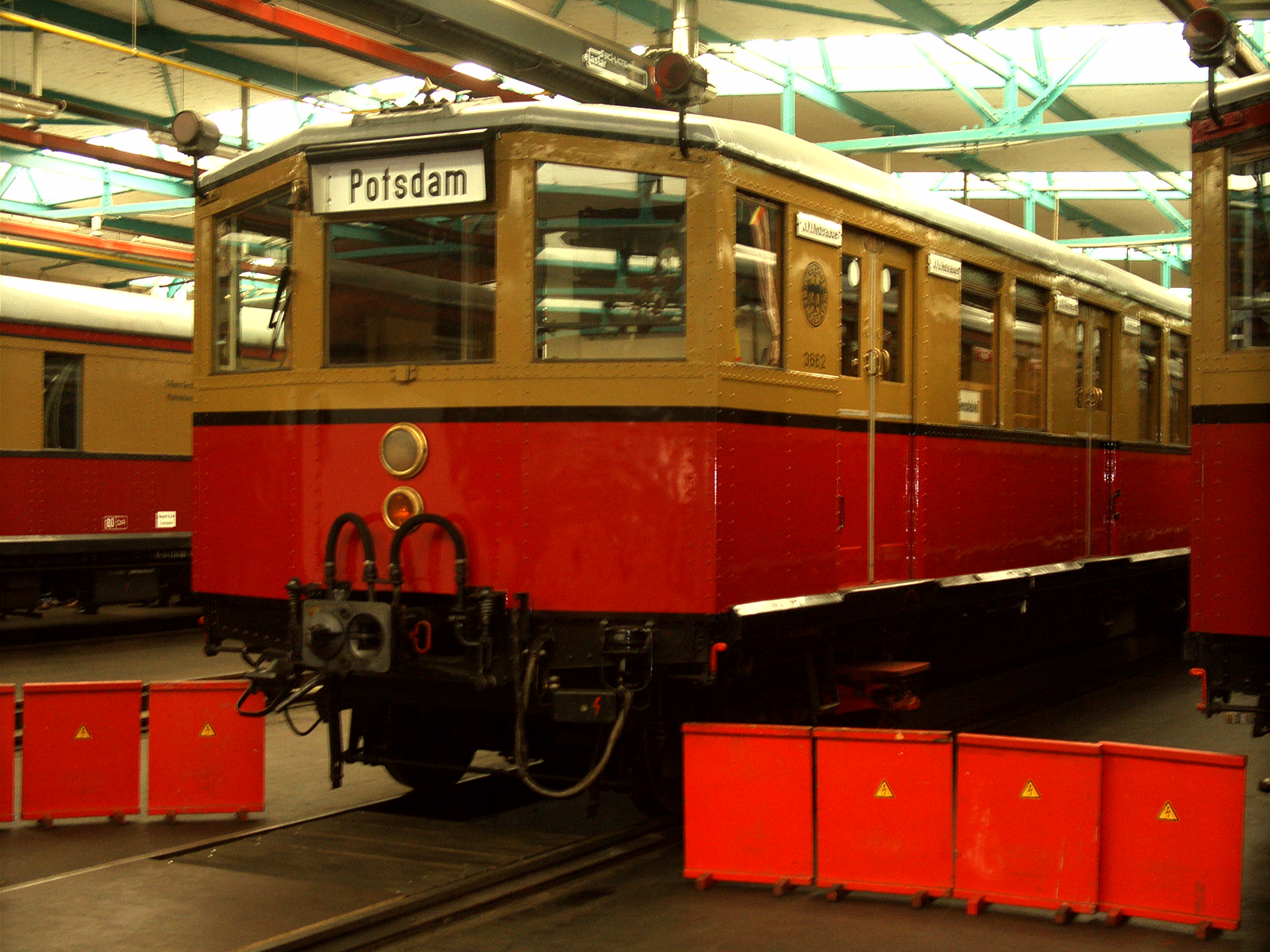
DRG Class ET 165 for Berlin S-Bahn

- The Chicago, Milwaukee, and St. Paul, a predecessor of the Milwaukee Road, changes its name to Chicago, Milwaukee, St. Paul & Pacific after a reorganization.
- William Sproule steps down from the presidency of the Southern Pacific Company, the parent company of the Southern Pacific Railroad. The position remains open until 1929.
- Hale Holden succeeds Henry deForest as Chairman of the Executive Committee for the Southern Pacific Company, the parent company of the Southern Pacific Railroad.
- The Boston, Revere Beach and Lynn Railroad, in Massachusetts, converts from steam locomotive power to electric power, adding motors, electrical equipment and controls to its passenger cars.
- The Atlantic Coast Line Railroad completes the last section of the Perry Cutoff, creating a more direct route between Chicago and Florida's west coast.
- The last new Pennsylvania Railroad class K4 Pacific is built.
- Deutsche Reichsbahn-Gesellschaft Class ET 165 "Stadtbahn" electric multiple units for Berlin S-Bahn introduced; the class will remain in commuter service into the 1990s.
- The Atchison, Topeka and Santa Fe Railway acquires the Kansas City, Mexico and Orient Railway.

== Births ==
=== March births ===
- March 14 – Richard Marsh, Baron Marsh, chairman of British Rail 1971–1976, is born (d. 2011).

=== October births ===
- October 3 – Edward L. Moyers, president of MidSouth Rail and Illinois Central Railroad, chairman and CEO of Southern Pacific Railroad, "Railroader of the Year" for 1995, is born (d. 2006).

== Deaths ==
=== April deaths ===
- April 5 - Chauncey Depew, president of New York Central Railroad (born 1834).

=== July deaths ===
- July 8 – Howard Elliott, president of Northern Pacific Railway 1903–1913, president of New York, New Haven and Hartford Railroad beginning in 1913, dies (b. 1860).
- July 30 - Job A. Edson, president of Kansas City Southern Railway 1905-1918 and 1920–1927, dies (born 1854).
