= 1922 in rail transport =

This article lists events related to rail transport that occurred in 1922.

== Events ==
=== May events ===
- May 17 – The Arkansas Short Line Railroad, a predecessor of St. Louis Southwestern Railway, is incorporated.

=== July events ===
- July 1 – The Great Railroad Strike of 1922 begins in the United States, coinciding with a reduction in railroad shop wages by seven cents per day mandated by the Railroad Labor Board. Continues until September 1.

=== August events ===
- August 31 – H. L. Hamilton and Paul Turner form a company called Electro-Motive Engineering (later to become General Motors Electro-Motive Division) in Cleveland, Ohio.

=== October events ===
- October – International Union of Railways (UIC) established in Paris to promote co-operation and standardisation.
- October 22 – Stuttgart Hauptbahnhof (first stage) opened in Germany.

=== November events ===
- The first Willamette locomotive is built for Coos Bay Lumber Company of Marshfield, Oregon.
- July 26 – The Drammen Line in Norway takes electric traction into use between Oslo West Station and Brakerøya.

=== December events ===
- December 9 – Chemins de fer de Paris à Lyon et à la Méditerranée resumes the Calais-Mediterranée Express, now known as Le Train Bleu because of its Wagons-Lits cars, between Calais Gare Maritime and Menton on the French Riviera.

=== Unknown date events ===
- The New York Central acquires the Cleveland, Cincinnati, Chicago and St. Louis Railroad (the Big Four Railroad).
- Sir Henry Thornton succeeds David Blyth Hanna as president of Canadian National Railway.
- George Hughes succeeds H. P. M. Beames as Chief Mechanical Engineer of the London and North Western Railway.

== Births ==
=== February births ===
- February 27 – Robert B. Claytor, president of Norfolk and Western Railway (died 1993)

=== March births ===
- March 22 – Livio Dante Porta, Argentinian steam locomotive mechanical engineer (died 2003)

=== July births ===
- July 20 – Alan Stephenson Boyd, first United States Secretary of Transportation 1966–1969, president of Illinois Central Railroad 1969-1972, president of Amtrak (died 2020)

== See also ==
- List of rail accidents (1920–1929)
