= 1866 in rail transport =

This article lists events related to rail transport that occurred in 1866.

== Events ==
=== February events ===
- February 14 – The Piedmont Railroad in the United States completes a 4-day change of gauge from standard to 5 ft (1524 mm) gauge in connection with the Richmond and Danville Railroad.

=== April events ===
- April 29 – Ancona–Orte railway (Società per le strade ferrate romane) completed across the Apennine Mountains of the Kingdom of Italy.

=== May events ===
- May 20 – Naples–Salerno railway completed throughout to Salerno in Italy.

=== June events ===
- June 3 – First section of Ionian Railway in Italy opens from Reggio Calabria to Lazzaro.
- June 20 – The Great Southern and Western Railway of Ireland introduces the first of its Class 101 0-6-0 goods locomotive from its Inchicore Works, Dublin. This will become by far the most numerous of any class of locomotive to run in Ireland, with 111 built up to 1903, and almost half the class will still be in road service as Class J15 when Córas Iompair Éireann abandons steam at the end of 1962.

=== July events ===
- July 2 – Cholsey and Wallingford Railway in England opens.
- July 27 – The Atlantic and Pacific Railroad in the United States is chartered by a special act of Congress.
- July 30 – The Great North of Scotland Railway gained full ownership of the Morayshire Railway.

=== August events ===
- August 11 – The Kansas Pacific Railway tracks reach Manhattan, Kansas, where westward progress stalls while a bridge is built across the Big Blue River.
- August 28 – The Danville, Urbana, Bloomington and Pekin Railroad, in Illinois, is incorporated.
- August 29 – The first demonstration runs are held on the Mount Washington Cog Railway, in New Hampshire, as Peppersass, the road's first steam locomotive, hauls a platform of passengers up a 0.1-mile (161 m) section of track.

=== September events ===
- September 1
  - Construction of the Randsfjorden Line in Norway is completed to Vikersund.
  - The South Eastern Railway of England opens its Cannon Street station (in the City of London), Cannon Street Railway Bridge and Dartford Loop Line.
- September 7 – On the death of Matthias W. Baldwin, Matthew Baird becomes the sole proprietor of Baldwin Locomotive Works.
- September 11 – Bristol and Exeter Railway opens the Chard and Taunton Railway to passenger service as a branch line of the B&ER.

=== November events ===
- November 7 – The Ruse-Varna line, the first railway in Bulgaria, officially opens.
- November – Construction on the Kansas Pacific Railway reaches Junction City, Kansas, from Kansas City.

=== December events ===
- December – Florence–Rome railway (Società delle Ferrovie Livornesi) completes its route via Perugia in Italy.
- December 15 – Brescia–Cremona railway opens in Italy.
- Probable date – The Talyllyn Railway at Tywyn in Wales begins to carry passengers officially.

=== Unknown date events ===
- The first 2-8-0 with a leading truck is built by the Baldwin Locomotive Works for the Lehigh and Mahanoy Railroad (United States).
- The John Bull, eventually to become the oldest operable steam locomotive in the world, is retired from active service on the Camden and Amboy Railroad.

== Births ==
=== January births ===
- January 31 – William Wallace Atterbury, president of the Pennsylvania Railroad 1925–1935 (d. 1935)

== Deaths ==
=== September deaths ===
- September 7 – Matthias W. Baldwin, American steam locomotive manufacturer and founder of Baldwin Locomotive Works (b. 1795).

=== Unknown date deaths ===
- Holmes Hinkley, American steam locomotive manufacturer (b. 1793).
