= 1965 in rail transport =

This article lists events related to rail transport that occurred in 1965.

== Events ==
=== January events ===
- January 3 – Boston & Maine Railroad ends passenger service to Portland, Maine. Maine is without rail passenger connections to the remainder of the United States until Amtrak initiates Downeaster service between Portland and Boston in December 2001.
- January 4 – British Railways adopts a new corporate identity including the name British Rail and the 'double arrow' symbol.
- January 17 – Riverview station, in Waltham, Massachusetts, on the Boston & Maine Railroad closes.

The bold lines show what were thought in 1965 to be British Rail's only future trunk routes; many of the assumptions did not come to pass.

=== February events ===
- February – The British Railways Board publishes The Development of the Major Trunk Routes (sometimes known as the "second Beeching Report", although Richard Beeching had little input) which identifies routes to be targeted for development particularly for freight traffic.
- February 27 – Last wholly steam-worked standard gauge United States common carrier (freight) railroad, the Buffalo Creek & Gauley Railroad in West Virginia, ceases commercial operation, with 2-8-0 locomotive #4.

=== March events ===
- March 20 – At least 17 stations and two lines closed in Airedale and Wharfedale in West Yorkshire, England, as a result of the Beeching cuts.

=== May events ===
- May – John W. Barriger III succeeds William N. Deramus III as president of the Missouri–Kansas–Texas Railroad.
- May 31 – Richard Beeching steps down from the chairmanship of the British Railways Board, partly due to opposition within the Government to his views on transport in general.

=== June events ===
- June 14 – The 24-hour clock is introduced in all British Rail timetables.

=== October events ===
- October 15 – Meijō Line opened in Japan.
- October 31 – Canadian National Railway inaugurates Rapido passenger train service between Montreal and Toronto.

=== November events ===
- November 15 – The first commercial Freightliner service operates, on the West Coast Main Line between London and Glasgow.
- November 22 – Full electric operation of the British Rail West Coast Main Line between London Euston and Crewe.
- November 27 – Cessation of steam operation on the Western Region of British Railways.
- November – British Rail operates the first commercial Merry-go-round trains carrying coal between collieries and electricity generating stations.

=== December events ===
- December – General Electric introduces the GE U28C.
- December 9 – Căile Ferate Române, the national railway system of Romania, opens its first electrified segment using the existing Braşov-Predeal line.
- December 24 – Cessation of steam operation on the East Coast Main Line in England.
- December 31 – The last day of operation for the original Bergen Tramway in Bergen, Norway.

=== Unknown date events ===
- All rail transport in Libya ceases.
- Southern Pacific's bid for control of the Western Pacific is rejected by the Interstate Commerce Commission.
- First production class M62 locomotives (C-C diesel-electric) are turned out of Voroshilovgrad Locomotive Factory in Ukraine; 3,273 will be built for freight service in Eastern Bloc countries.
- The steam generators on Chicago, Rock Island & Pacific Railroad's EMC AB6 diesel locomotives are replaced with head-end power (HEP) units and the locomotives re-enter service, now on commuter trains in Chicago.

== Deaths ==
=== September deaths ===
- September 27 – William Stanier, Chief Mechanical Engineer of the London, Midland & Scottish Railway 1932–1944 (b. 1876).
