= 1916 in rail transport =

This article lists events related to rail transport that occurred in 1916.

== Events ==
=== January events ===
- January 15 - First through Berlin-Istanbul train.

=== February events ===
- February 4 - The Manila Railway Company (1906), Limited of London and the Manila Railroad Company corporation of New Jersey are merged by the Insular Government of the Philippine Islands to become the state-owned Manila Railroad Company.

=== April events ===
- April
  - Murman Railway in Russia completed from Petrograd to the city that becomes Murmansk (central section not completed until November). The intermediate station at Kola lies at 68° 52′ 58″ N, the world's most northerly station at this date.
  - Motor Rail deliver the first of over 900 petrol engined 60 cm narrow gauge railway locomotives for the British War Department Light Railways on the Western Front (World War I); substantially the same design is in production until the 1980s.
- April 13 - Oris Paxton Van Sweringen and his younger brother Mantis James Van Sweringen purchase a 75% controlling interest in the Nickel Plate Road from William Kissam Vanderbilt for $8.5 million.

=== May events ===
- May 6 - Rome and Fiuggi Rail Road opens for service.

=== July events ===
- July 16 - Much of the Southern Railway's mainline in North and South Carolina is damaged or destroyed by flooding.

=== August events ===
- August 24 - After a bankruptcy, the St. Louis and San Francisco Railroad is reorganized as the St. Louis - San Francisco Railway (often called the "Frisco").
- August 24 - Due to several serious accidents caused by broken red lenses in its signals, the New York Central Railroad discontinues white lights as indications to proceed. The new color is green.

=== September events ===
- September 11 - The almost-completed Quebec Bridge collapses for the second time.
- September 30 - Construction is completed on the Hell Gate Bridge in New York City.

=== October events ===
- October 5 - Opening of Amur River line completes through rail communication on Trans-Siberian Railway.

=== November events ===
- November 16 - The two-storey station opened by the California Southern Railroad in San Bernardino, California, is destroyed by fire.
- November 24 - German sleeping and dining car operator Mitropa is founded.

=== December events ===
- December 1 - In the Herceghalom rail crash in Hungary, a side collision occurs between an express train and a shunting passenger train, killing 69.

=== Unknown date events ===
- Early Summer - The Fairbourne Railway, in Wales, is converted from a horse-drawn tramway into a 15 in (381 mm) gauge steam railway.
- The Pennsylvania Railroad adopts the motto "the Standard Railroad of the World".
- The Pennsylvania Railroad's first I1s 2-10-0 "Decapod" locomotive is completed and first A5s 0-4-0 and B6sb switching locomotives enter service.
- Joel Coffin purchases Lima Locomotive Corporation; the company is renamed Lima Locomotive Works.
- The first all-steel fish car is built for use on American railroads.
- Underground Electric Railways Company of London, operator of the London Underground, adopts Johnston (typeface) as part of its corporate identity.
- In the USA all-railroad mileage peaks at 254,251 miles (409,177 km) with the most of lines located in the east part of country.

== Births ==
=== April births ===
- April 15 - Benjamin Biaggini, president of the Southern Pacific Company (U.S.) 1964–1976 (died 2005).

=== September births ===
- September 10 - Michael Cobb, British railway historian (died 2010).

== Deaths ==
=== March deaths ===
- March 18 - Karl Gölsdorf, Austrian steam locomotive designer (born 1861).

=== April deaths ===
- April 19 - Ephraim Shay, American inventor of the Shay locomotive (born 1839).

=== May deaths ===
- May 12 - Fred T. Perris, Chief Engineer of the California Southern Railroad (born 1836).
- May 29 - James J. Hill, American financier who gained control of the Great Northern Railway and the Northern Pacific Railway (born 1838).
