= Chemin de fer de la vallée de l'Eure =

Heritage railway in France

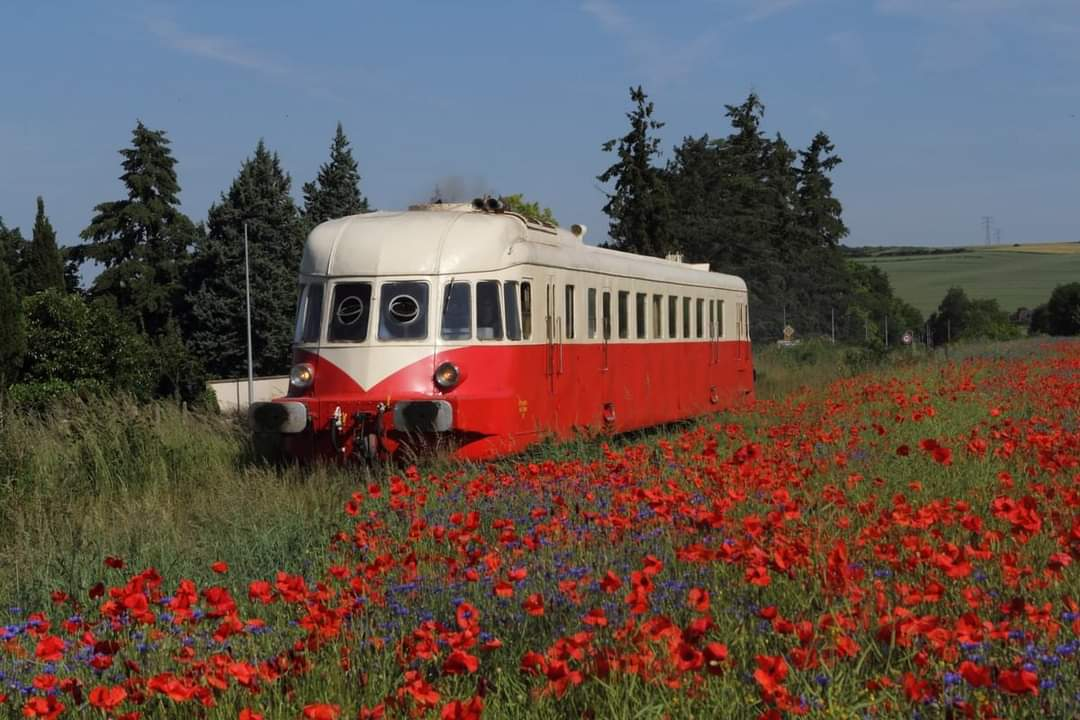
- Autorail X 3601
- Locale: Eure
- Coordinates: 49.01413°N 1.38791°E

Commercial operations
- Built by: Compagnie du chemin de fer de Rouen à Orléans
- Original gauge: 4 ft 8 1/2 in (1,435 mm)

Preserved operations
- Stations: 3
- Preserved gauge: 4 ft 8 1/2 in (1,435 mm)

Commercial history
- Closed to passengers: 1950
- Closed: 1989

Preservation history
- 1993: Reopen

The Chemin de fer de la vallée de l'Eure (English: Eure Valley Railway) is a tourist railway operated by an enthusiast association on a section of the old railway line from Orléans to Rouen, between their base at Pacy-sur-Eure and Breuilpont or Pacy-sur-Eure and Cocherel.

== Rolling stock ==
=== Steam locomotives ===
Original railway	Number and name	Type or class	Builder	Works number	Built	Wheels	Notes	Image
Société de Eclairage, Chauffage et de Force Motrice, Gennevilliers	No. 2 « L'Avenir »	150 PS Bt	Orenstein & Koppel	1494	1904	0-4-0T		
HBL de Petite-Rosselle	« L’Espérance »		Škoda	1087	1940	0-4-0T		

=== Diesel locomotives ===
Original railway	Number and name	Type or class	Builder	Works number	Built	Wheels	Notes	Image
SNCF	63813	SNCF Class BB 63500	Brissonneau et Lotz		1962	Bo-BoDE		
EDF	8082		Whitcomb, USA		1948	B-B		

=== Diesel shunters ===
Original railway	Number and name	Type or class	Builder	Works number	Built	Wheels	Notes	Image
SNCF	Y 7813	Y 7400	Moyse		1971	BDM		
SNCF	Y DE 20001	A6M 324 R	Deutz	39660	1943	0-4-0DH	Out of service, Property of T. Moncomble	
SNCF	Y DE 20003	WR 200 B 14	Jung	9583	1942	0-4-0DH	Under restoration, Property of T. Moncomble	
SNCF	Y 6570	Y 6400			1957			
SNCF	Y 2461	Y 2400	Decauville		1965	BDM	Property of A. Mionnet	
SNCF, Moulin Neuf	Y 11251	Y 11200	Valermi	1251	1953	Bo-DE	Rebuilt from a Crochat locotracteur in 1918	
PLM		RLCB	Berliet				Remotorised with an Alsthom Agrom engine. Property of A. Zanelli	
PLM		RLD 35B	Berliet		1935		Property of A. Zanelli	
Sud-Aviation	200037	TE.801	Decauville				Property of A. Mionnet, used as weed killing vehicle.	
Armée camp de Chemilly-sur-Yonne	A000079		Crochat, later converted by Établissements industriels B. Richard					
Paper mill in Vernon		4V40	Baudet, Donon et Roussel	199	1930			

=== Autorails ===
Original railway	Number and name	Type or class	Builder	Works number	Built	Wheels	Notes	Image
SNCF	X 5506	X 5500	Renault			1A-2	Property of AJECTA	
SNCF	X 5509	X 5500	Renault			1A-2	Under restoration	
SNCF	X 3601	X 3600	Renault			B-2	Property of AJECTA	
SNCF	X 4046	X 3800 "Picasso"	ANF			B-2	re-motorised with Renault V12 517G, Property of Autorail Lorraine Champagne Ardenne)	

=== Draisines ===
Original railway	Number and name	Type or class	Builder	Works number	Built	Wheels	Notes	Image
			Billard	673	1933			
SNCF	DU49	4M-035	Billard					
RATP	X-113		SMISO					

=== Passenger carriages ===
- 18849 - Alsace-Lorraine C5tfp 18849 axle car with end platforms built 1914
- 37434, 37440 and 37443 - modernized Ouest coaches, type B6t (Property of A. Mionnet)
- 2 ex-SNCF USI coaches converted into bar-restaurants
- 42907, OCEM Payi postal coach from 1932. (Property COPEF)
- 50 87 00-37 125-7 OCEM Paz. (COPEF Property)
- 39570 Ouest metallized luggage van Dqdmp 39570 (Property of A. Mionnet)
- 19431 Est axle van Dqd from 1908 converted into a "Digital Wagon" (Ajecta Property)
- 2 baladeuses built from old covered wagons

=== Wagons ===
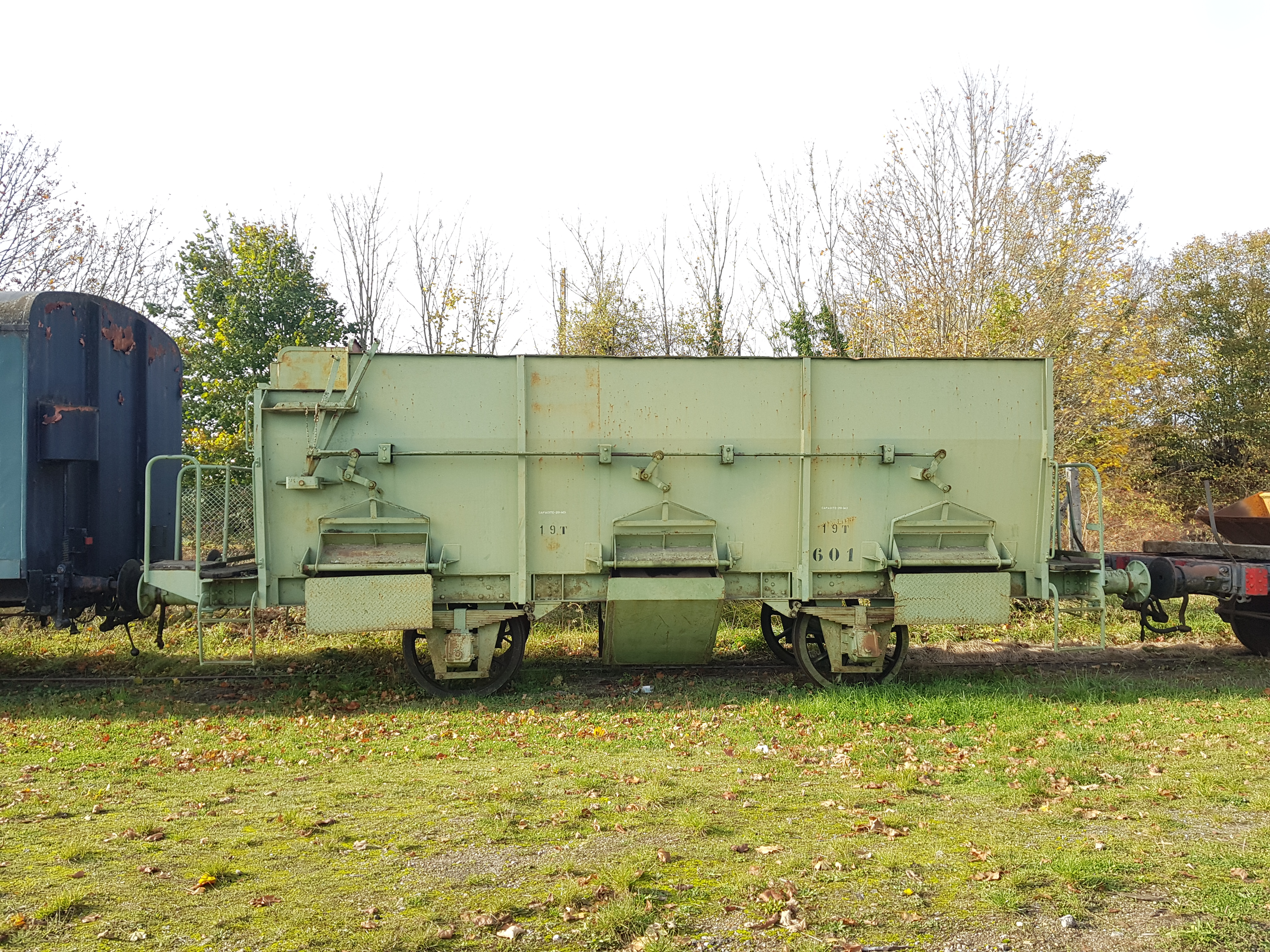
Chemins de fer de l'Ouest ballast wagon

- 1 Saltley box wagon on an Est chassis
- 1 Saltley box wagon on a Saltley chassis
- 1 German bogie flat wagon
- 1 USA bogie flat wagon ex USATC
- 1 USATC bogie flatcar
- 1 USA 18 ex-SNCF emergency boxcar
- 2 Standard boxcars
- 1 German boxcar
- 1 OCEM tank car
- 1 Ouest ballast wagon
