= Hagerman Tunnel =

Coordinates: 39°15′14″N 106°29′13″W

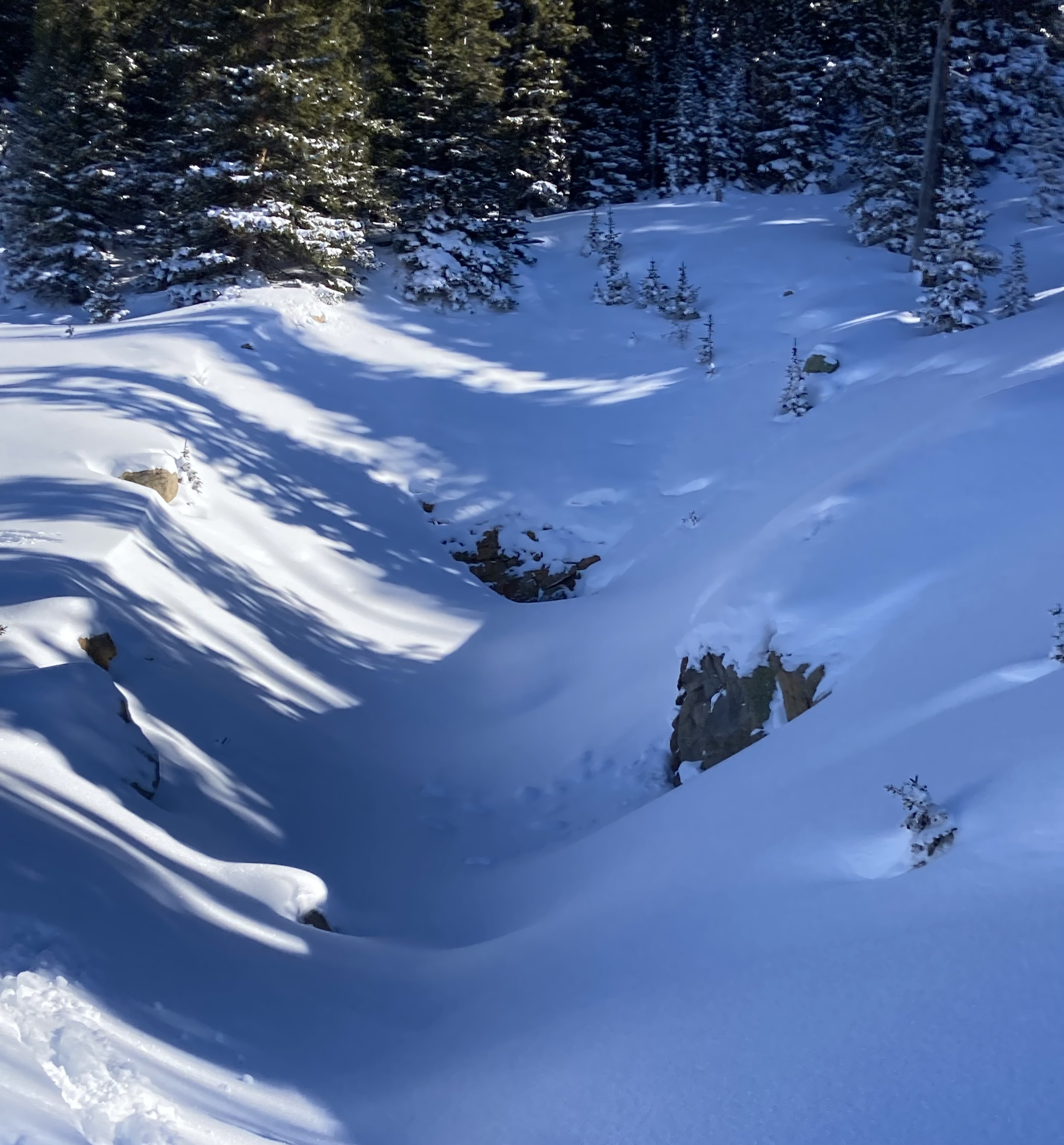
- Location of the Hagerman Tunnel's west portal, 2023
- Interactive map of Hagerman Tunnel

Overview
- Line: Colorado Midland Railroad
- Location: Hagerman Pass, Lake / Pitkin counties, Colorado, USA

Operation
- Opened: 1883
- Closed: 1899

Technical
- Track length: 2,161 feet (659 m)
- Max elevation: 11,528 feet (3,514 m)

The Hagerman Tunnel was a 2,161 ft (659 m) railroad tunnel crossing the Continental Divide in Colorado at an altitude of 11,528 ft (3,514 m).

Constructed in 1887 by the Colorado Midland Railroad and named for Midland officer James John Hagerman, it was replaced by the Busk-Ivanhoe Tunnel in 1893. There was a 1,084 ft (330 m) wooden trestle built on the eastern approach to the tunnel. At the time of its construction it was one of the highest tunnels ever built.

Following Colorado Midland's 1897 bankruptcy, the tunnel saw use again, but traffic returned to the Busk-Ivanhoe tunnel a few years later.

== Present Day ==
The railroad grade on the east side of the Hagerman Tunnel is now open to the public for hiking or biking in the summer. The 5.5 mile round-trip provides views of the eastern portals of both the Busk-Ivanhoe and Hagerman tunnels, as well as the trestle leading to the Hagerman tunnel.
