= Samuel Marsh (railroad executive) =

American businessman

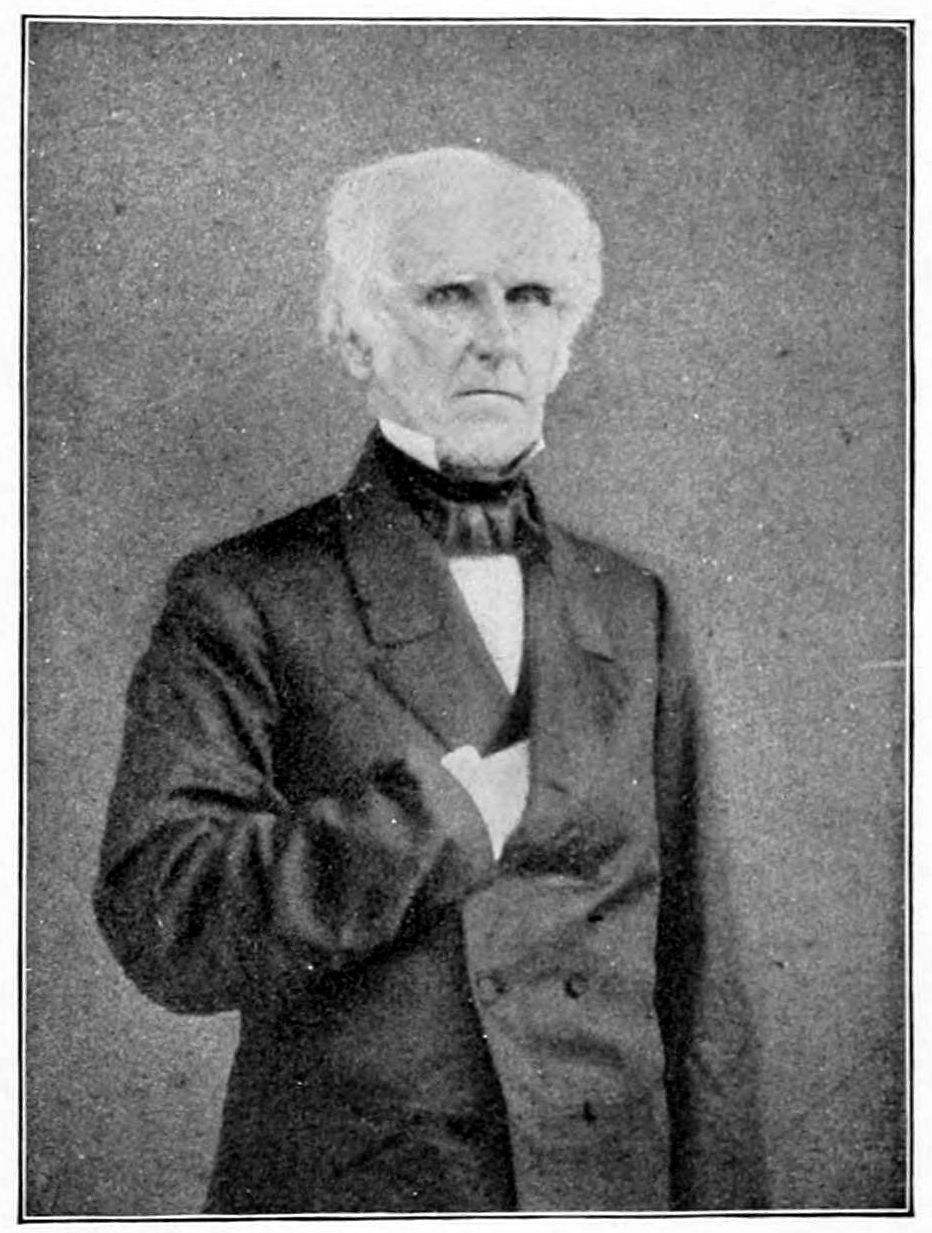
- Born: 1786
- Died: 1872 (aged 85–86)
- Occupation: railroad executive
- Known for: president of Erie Railroad

Samuel Marsh (1786–1872) was an American businessman and president of the Erie Railroad from 1859 to 1861.

== Biography ==
Samuel Marsh was born in 1786, at Haverhill, Massachusetts, and died in 1872, at the Astor House, New York, at which place he had resided a greater portion of his long and useful life. His New England ancestry, a long-lived and estimable family, traced back through the landing of the Pilgrims in 1638, becomes in the twelfth century, not Marsh, but de Marisco, with Marsh quaintly written as a parenthetical alternative in the manuscripts.

Samuel Marsh came to New York during the War of 1812, and from that time made the metropolis his home. After the cessation of hostilities with Great Britain, he travelled long in Europe for the purpose of completing his business education and familiarizing himself with the usages of European trade. In 1819 he established the New York Dyeing and Printing Company, with factories on Staten Island, and was its president until his death.

The development of the canals of the United States greatly interested him, and in the early part of the century, in connection with Erastus Corning, Horatio Seymour, and others, he projected a canal system by which the waters of the Great Lakes and the Mississippi River were to be connected. The name of the enterprise was the Fox River Improvement Company. Many millions of dollars have been expended on it. The project greatly aided the material growth of the State of Wisconsin, although as yet the canal is not available for vessels of deep-water draught.

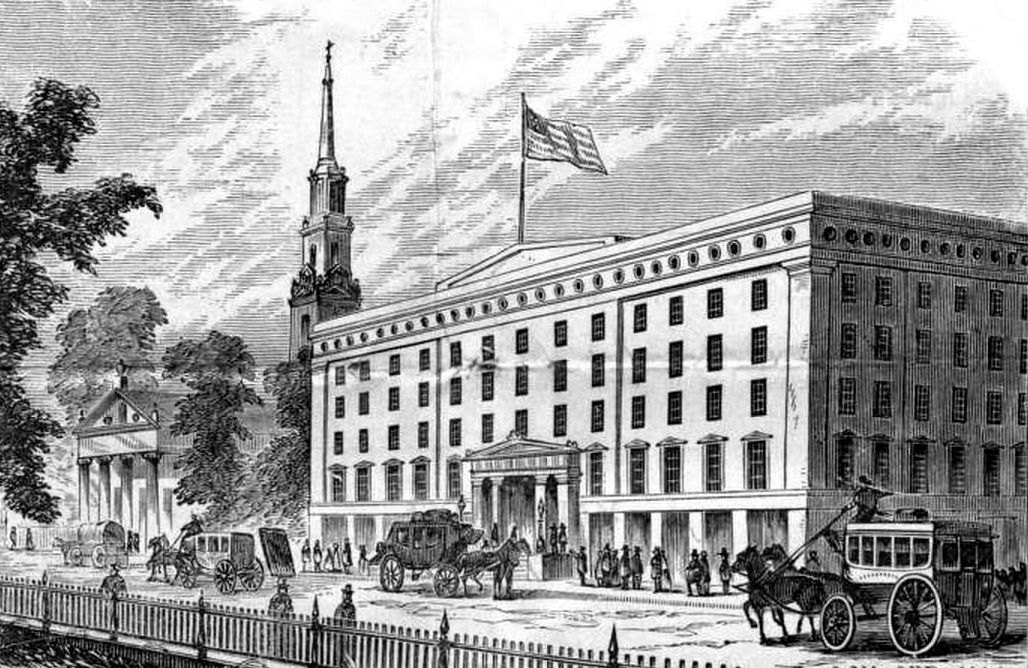
Astor House, New York City 1862

Marsh was among the pioneers of railways in America. He was one of the twenty gentlemen who met in 1845, at the New York Hotel, on the invitation of Benjamin Loder, and united in a subscription amounting to three millions of dollars, which was intended to complete the construction of the Erie. From 1846 until 1865, Mr. Marsh was vice-president of the Erie Railroad, his incumbency of that position being occasionally interrupted by his being called upon to assume the duties of president ad interim. He invariably declined to permanently assume the office of president of the corporation.

Up until his death in 1872, Marsh engaged with Moses Taylor and John I. Blair in constructing railroads across the United States. In his tenure he also advised his nephew, Nathaniel Marshabout his duties as secretary, receiver, and president of Erie.

== Work ==
=== New York Dyeing and Printing Company ===
In 1819 Samuel Marsh established the New York Dyeing and Printing Company, with factories on Staten Island. Around 1824 it passed into the hands of a Joint Stock Company, who, soon after obtaining their charter, added to the dyeing business, heretofore carried on alone, that of the printing. In the 1850s the New York Dyeing and Printing Company located at Factoryville in Staten Island was one of the largest establishments of that country, in which the dyeing and printing of silk and cotton goods is carried on. An 1854 article in The New York Times described:

The buildings are extensive, covering upwards of four acres. The printing shop is a large four-story frame building. Some dress patterns, and some woolen and cotton goods are printed in this department, but the staple article is silk handkerchiefs, which are to be seen in every variety, and of the most durable styles. Some two thousand pieces were printed in one season, two years ago. During the busy season of the year, now at hand, fifty printers are employed in the building, each having a boy or girl who tears for him. The adult workmen are paid by piece-work, and can earn from 14 shillings to $2 per day. There are three modes of printing, by blocks, cylinders and stereotype plates, all of which are practiced there. There is a separate department called the "Print-cutters' shop", in which the blocks used in the printing are all made. Some of these blocks are cut at very considerable expense. We observed also two designers busily at work here...

By 1860 the company employing over 200 people and eight steam engines annually producing over five million yard of cotton muslin. Beside this company, Samuel Marsh had founded related firms such as "The New York India Rubber Cloth Company,". This company was founded in 1835 in cooperation with Nathan Barrett and some other persons associated with them, for the purpose of manufacturing water-proof cloth and other articles incident thereto. It was located in the town of Castletown, county of Richmond.

=== Acting President in New York and Erie Railroad Company ===
Although Samuel Marsh was the official head of the New York and Erie Railroad Company from 1859 to 1862 – being the last President of the old Company – the direction of its affairs was his merely in a formal way, as the company was in the custody of the court, and Nathaniel Marsh, as Receiver, was the officer and agent of the court to manage and direct the business of the company until the legal requirements of the situation might be met, and the property handed back to the possession of its owners. President Marsh's office was simply an advisory one, and while his ideas, and those of the Board, might have been acted upon, and in many instances were, by the Receiver, the latter was in no way bound to follow any such instruction or advice.

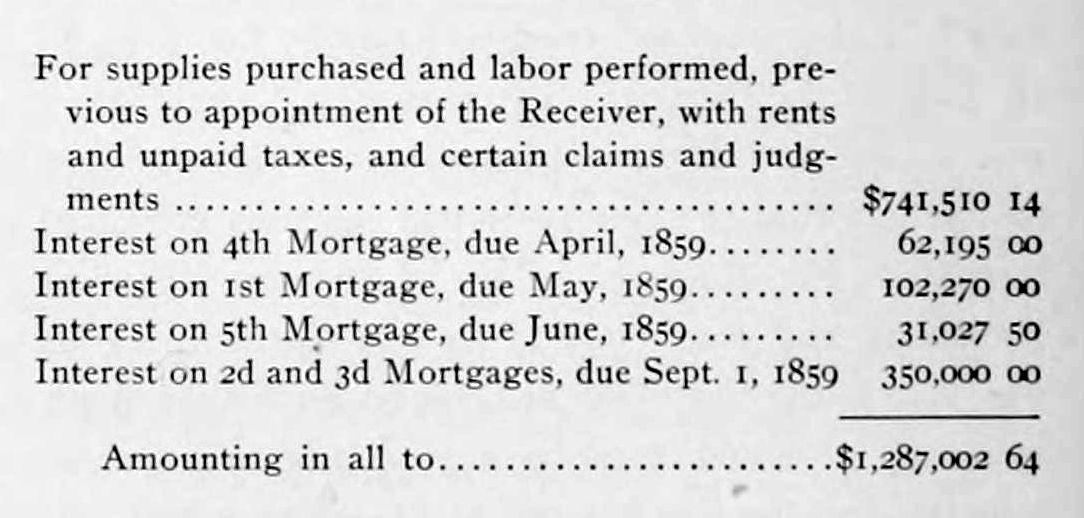
Erie Railroad, payment plan, 1859

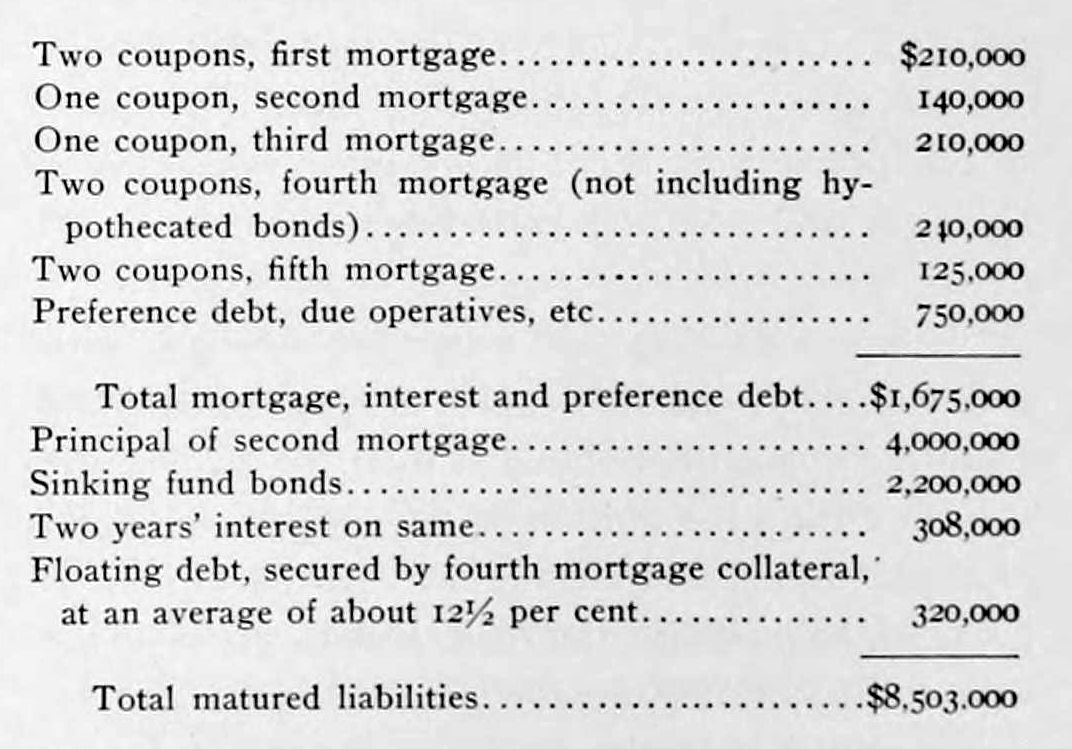
Erie, total matured liabilities, 1859

A man of less experience in Erie matters, however, might have been of much hindrance to the Receiver in the management of the complicated business of the company. Samuel Marsh having been vice-president of the Company several years, had a knowledge that was of much service to the Receiver, and his application of it aided greatly in hastening the development and success of the plans that were devised for Erie's rehabilitation.

Receiver Marsh found a most discouraging outlook when he took charge of the company's property. He subsequently wrote:

The income of the road, owing to the depressed state of business generally, and to other causes (as the Receiver put it), was barely sufficient to defray the current expenses...

Meanwhile, claims for labor and supplies, and judgments rendered before his appointment, and rents and unpaid taxes, were pressing for immediate payment. These claims amounted to more than $700,000. The forbearance of the creditors, and especially of the employees, whose pay was some months in arrears, relieved the Receiver of much embarrassment, and increased earnings enabled him, in the course of four months after his appointment, to discharge all these claims, and pay the current expenses of the road.

The settlement of these claims, and providing for payment of future interest on the mortgage debt out of the earnings of the road, would have continued the road in the hands of a Receiver for years, so an agreement was made between the stockholders and the creditors of the company, by which the conflicting interests among the latter should be submitted to the adjudication of Trustees.

October 22, 1859, a contract was made by the company with J.C. Bancroft Davis and Dudley S. Gregory, who, under its provisions, undertook the task. The plan they proposed was that the unsecured bondholders should exchange their bonds, with four years' accrued interest, for seven per cent, preferred stock, and that the common stockholders should stand, as they then were, subsequent in interest to the creditors of the company.

=== Financial reorganization ===
Henry Varnum Poor (1860) explained in more details, that on the 16th of Aug., 1859, at the suit of the Fourth Mortgage Bondholders for the foreclosure of this mortgage, a Receiver was appointed to take charge of the road and its effects. He was directed to pay, in the first place, all arrearages due employees of the road; also for supplies used in operating it; also all other charges incident to its protection and maintenance, and to hold the net earnings subject to the order of the Court. There were received by him from earnings and other sources, up to 1st Jan., 1860, $2,424,452. The payments in the meantime were as follows:

Payments on account of interest on First Mortgage Bonds... $ 207,270
Payments on account of current expenses, arrearages, etc. $ 2,145,007
Payments on account of judgments against the Company... $ 45,000

Cash on hand January 1st, 1860... $ 27,175

Total... $ 2,424,452

The following proposition has been made for adjusting the affairs of the company: To capitalize the Unsecured Bonds, with the interest due on the same, and for two years in advance, into a Preferred Stock, bearing 7 per cent, interest; the 1st Mortgage bondholders to extend the term for the payment of their coupons to March 1, 1860; the 2d Mortgage to Sept., 1860; the 3d Mortgage to March, 1861; the 4th and 5th Mortgages to Dec. 1st, 1861. In case of foreclosure, the same relations between the different classes of bondholders and stockholders to be preserved.

In the meantime it is expected that the net earnings will discharge the liabilities of the company, the overdue coupons, and supply the means for the completion of the Long Dock, estimated at §500,000.

=== New Erie Railway Company ===
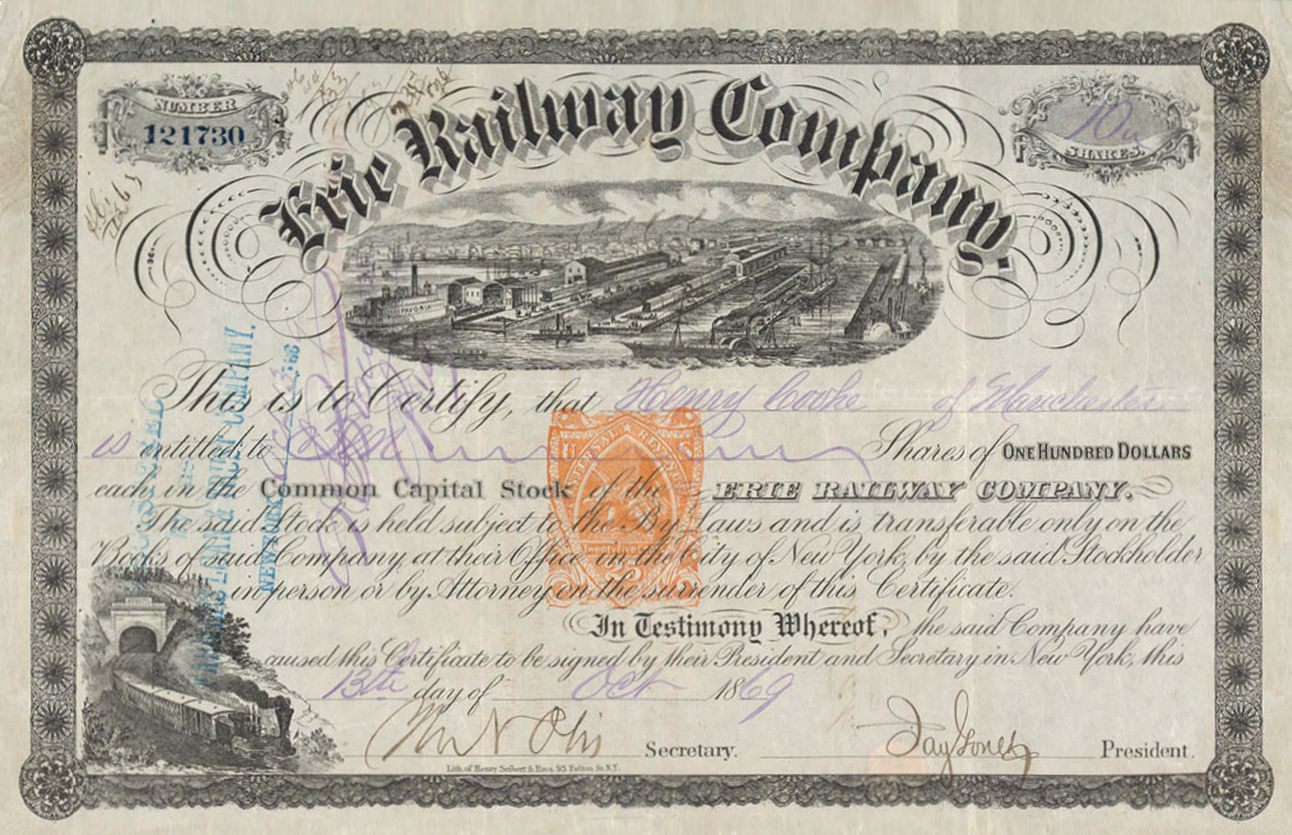
New common capital stock certificate of the Erie Railroad Company, 1860s.

In 1861, William Buck Dana (1829–1910) reports in the Merchants Magazine and Commercial Review reports, that the new corporation of the Erie Railway Company was organized in May 1861 by the election of Nathaniel Marsh as president; Samuel Marsh as vice president; H.N. Otis, Secretary; and Talman J. Waters, Treasurer, and the directors of the late New-York and Erie Company as directors; Mr. Wright, of Binghamton, and Mr. Diven, of Elmira, being substituted for Mr. Conn and Mr. Gelpcke.

The capital, in common shares, to consist of so much of the present $11,550,000 as may be assented to file contract of reorganization before the 29th of July next; and the capital in preferred shares to be so much of the unsecured and judgment debt as shall be assented by the same time, together with the arrearages of interest thereon, the whole estimated at $8,000,000, or the equivalent of about 80,000 preferred shares.

=== Second presidency in 1864 ===
In 1864 following the death of President Nathaniel Marsh, his uncle, Samuel Marsh, then vice-president of the company, was chosen President pro tempore. Samuel Marsh was the head of the New York Dyeing and Bleaching Company, and had been for sixteen years a member of the Erie Directory, during which time he had been vice-president, and President through the Receivership of Nathaniel Marsh. He was the logical successor to the Presidency, and if he had insisted on being chosen, the honor would undoubtedly have been bestowed upon him for the term; but there were influences coming to the fore in Erie affairs just then that preferred another head to the company, and Samuel Marsh declined to be a candidate for the office.

== Publications ==
- Samuel Marsh and Charles Minot "New York and Erie Railroad report" in: Report of the State Engineer and Surveyor on the Railroads of the State of New York. by New York (State). Board of Railroad Commissioners. 1862. p. 174-194

Business positions
Preceded by Charles Moran	President of Erie Railroad; 1859–1861	Succeeded by Nathaniel Marsh
Preceded by Nathaniel Marsh	President of Erie Railroad; 1864	Succeeded by Robert H. Berdell
