= Daniel M. Harkness =

American merchant and businessman

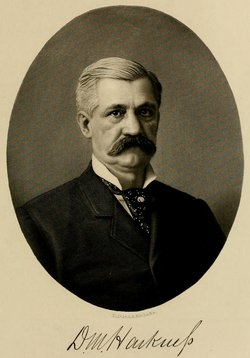
- Born: September 26, 1822; Milan, Ohio; United States
- Died: August 5, 1896 (age 74); Bellevue, Ohio
- Resting place: Bellevue Cemetery, Bellevue, Ohio
- Occupation(s): Business investor, Standard Oil
- Spouse: Isabella Harkness
- Children: 5 children: 3 died in childbirth, daughter Katie died at age 8, and son William L. Harkness died at age 60
- Parent(s): Dr. David M. Harkness and Elizabeth Morrison Caldwell Harkness

Daniel M. Harkness (September 26, 1822 – August 5, 1896) was an American merchant and businessman in Ohio. He played a role in the formation of Standard Oil in Ohio.

His older half-brother Stephen V. Harkness and younger half-brother Henry M. Flagler became two of the original five founding partners of Standard Oil, along with John D. Rockefeller. Daniel Harkness had persuaded Henry Flagler to move to Ohio when young and join him in his uncle's business. There Flagler met Stephen V. Harkness and John D. Rockefeller. Daniel Harkness became a major stockholder in Standard Oil and one of the wealthiest individuals of his day.

== Family ==
Harkness was the son of Dr. David M. Harkness and his second wife, Elizabeth Morrison (Caldwell). His father had been widowed, and had a son Stephen V. Harkness from his first marriage. David died when Daniel was young. Later the widowed Elizabeth Harkness took her two sons and returned to upstate New York. There she married Isaac Flagler, a Presbyterian minister in Hopewell, New York. They had a son, Henry Flagler, Daniel's half-brother.

== Early days & Standard Oil ==
In 1837, Daniel Harkness moved to Bellevue, Ohio from Hopewell, New York to live with his paternal uncle Lamon G. (LG) Harkness. He later moved to Republic, Ohio to work in the Harkness store there. Daniel encouraged his younger half-brother, Henry Flagler, to leave Hopewell and join him in Republic, which Henry did in 1844. The two worked for a while in Republic and then moved to Bellevue to become more involved in the grain and distillery business.

He married his uncle L.G.'s daughter Isabella and Henry married her sister Mary. The two young men both did very well in Bellevue. Henry decided to venture into the salt business in Michigan, but found he did not have sufficient technical knowledge to weather changes in the markets during the Civil War. When Flagler returned from Michigan having lost a substantial salt mine investment, Daniel helped bail him out by lending him money.

Flagler moved to Cleveland in 1866, thinking he would have better opportunity in a larger city, and had an office in the same building as John D. Rockefeller.

Harkness and his family remained primarily in Bellevue, taking over the home that Henry Flagler had built there, known as "The Gingerbread House".

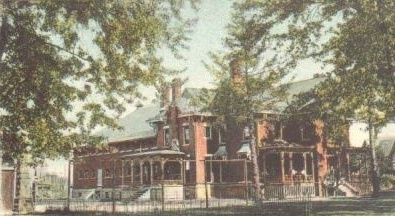
Daniel M. Harkness home in Bellevue, Ohio, originally built by Henry Flagler and later became the Bellevue YMCA

== Personal life ==
Daniel was a regimental quartermaster for the Union in the Civil War from 1861 to 1863. Harkness married Isabella, and they had children together. She died in 1864. Later he donated the funds to build Harkness Memorial First Congregational Church next door to his home in her honor; it was completed in 1887. He stipulated that the church must not have a bell because he did not want to be disturbed by one. The church is still standing in Bellevue to this day.

Harkness was appointed a trustee of Standard Oil. When he died in 1896 his estate, estimated to be $35 million and mostly in Standard Oil stock, was left to his only surviving child, William L. Harkness. This $35 million would equate to approximately $1 billion in 2013.

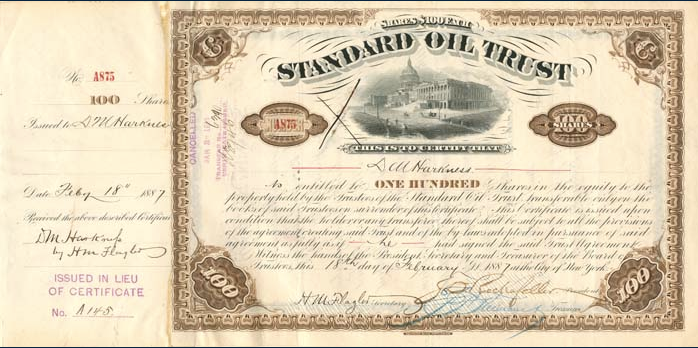
1887 Standard Oil Stock Certificate of Daniel M. Harkness signed by his half-brother Henry Flagler and John D. Rockefeller
