= William L. Harkness =

American businessman and philanthropist (1858–1919)

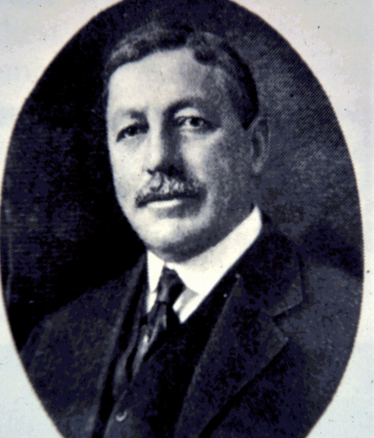
- Born: August 8, 1858; Bellevue, Ohio, U.S.
- Died: May 10, 1919 (aged 60); New Hyde Park, New York, U.S.
- Resting place: Woodlawn Cemetery
- Education: Yale University (Class of 1881)
- Occupations: Business investor, heir
- Spouse: Edith Hale
- Children: Louise Hale Harkness (1898-1978), William Hale Harkness (1900–1954)
- Parent(s): Daniel M. Harkness and Isabella Harkness

William Lamon Harkness (August 8, 1858 – May 10, 1919) was an American businessman and inheritor of a large share of Standard Oil.

== Early life ==
William Lamon Harkness was born in Bellevue, Ohio, the son of Daniel M. Harkness, who was the half-brother of both Henry Flagler and Stephen V. Harkness, both founders of Standard Oil, and his wife Isabella Harkness. Upon his father Daniel's death in 1896, he inherited a large share in Standard Oil, a company in which his father had been an early shareholder. He is also a cousin of noted philanthropist Edward Harkness who also benefitted from his father's involvement with Standard Oil.

He attended Bellevue Public Schools in Bellevue, Ohio and The Brooks Military School in Cleveland. In 1881, Harkness graduated from Yale University.

== Life ==
In 1896, he moved from Cleveland, Ohio to a home at 12 East 53rd Street in Manhattan, New York City. He also owned a country home on Dosoris Island, at Glen Cove on Long Island. In 1913, he contracted James Gamble Rogers to remodel the old house into the residence that he named "The Wings".

A yachtsman and sportsman, he was a member of The Union Club of Cleveland, The Metropolitan Club New York, New York Yacht Club, the Seawanhaka Corinthian Yacht Club and Piping Rock Club.

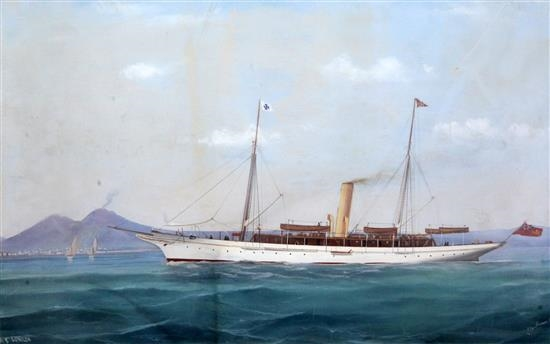
Steam yacht Gunilda

In August 1911, while in command of his steam yacht Gunilda on Lake Superior, he ran her aground, due to his failure in recognising a requirement for a pilot and then compounding the matter by not hiring tugs at the appropriate time. She would sink in days. He put in a claim against the ship's insurer, Lloyd's of London for about $132,000, and received $100,000 compensation.

=== Philanthropy ===
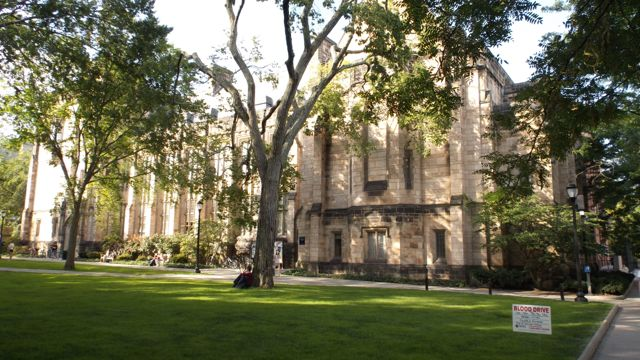
Harkness Hall at Yale University

Shortly before his death, Harkness donated $400,000 to Yale University. The William L. Harkness Hall at Yale University was completed in 1927 as the gift of Mr. W.L. Harkness, B.A. 1881, and his family. It is a Collegiate Gothic building of Aquia sandstone with Ohio sandstone trim and contains offices and lecture & recitation rooms for the French, German, and Music departments. William Adams Delano was the architect.

== Personal life ==
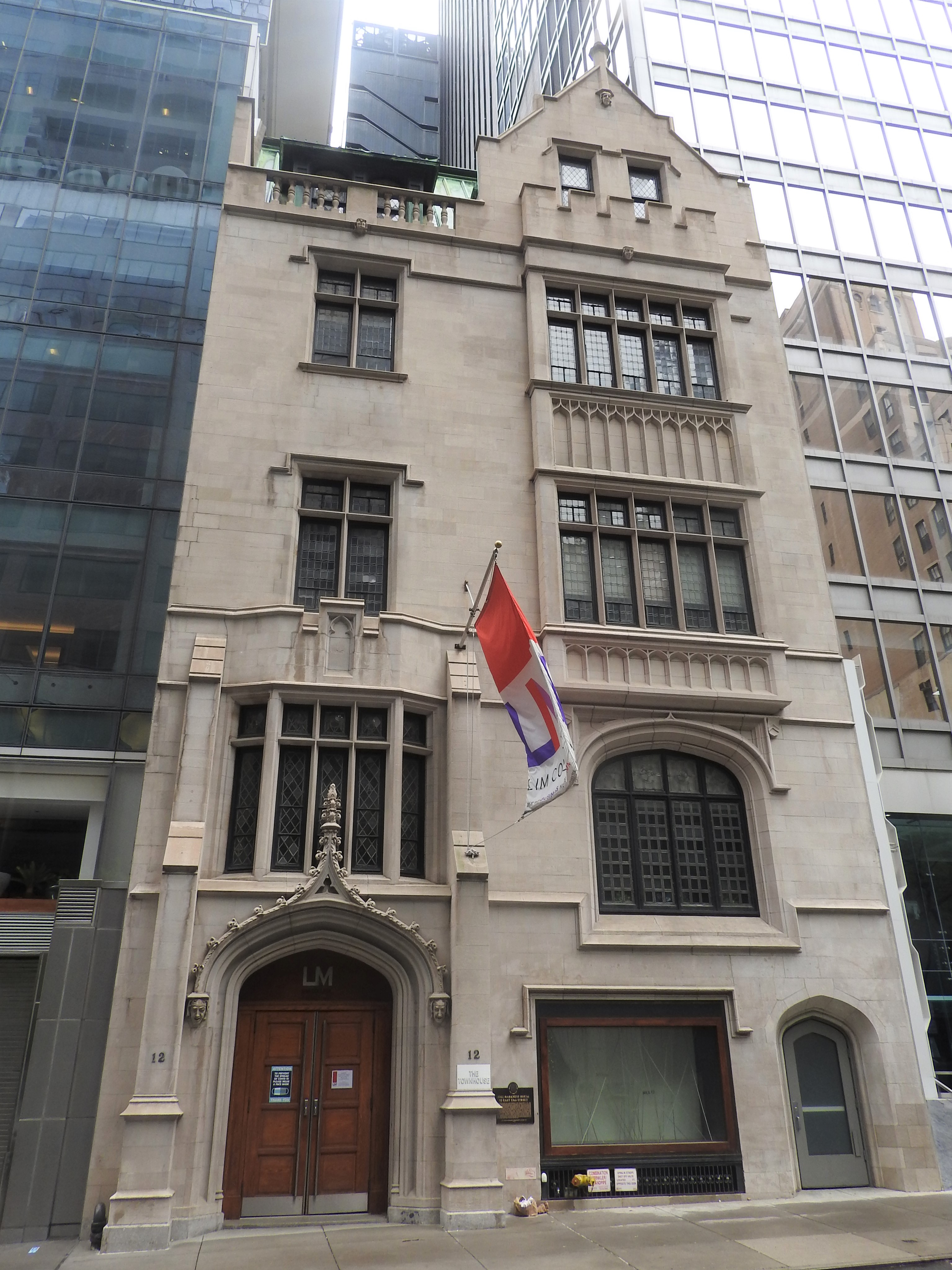
William L. Harkness house at 12 East 53rd Street, Manhattan, New York City

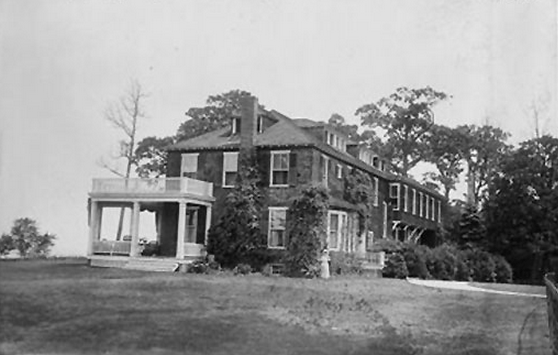
William L. Harkness Estate in Glen Cove, New York, known as The Wings and then Dosoris

Harkness was married to Edith Hale (1863–1947), daughter of Edwin B. Hale, a prominent banker from Cleveland. Together, they were the parents of:

- Louise Hale Harkness (b. 1897), who married David Sinton Ingalls (1899–1985) in 1922. His mother, Jane Taft, was the niece of President William Howard Taft. He was the grandson of railroad executive Melville E. Ingalls, and great-grandson of industrialist David Sinton.
- William Hale Harkness (1900–1954), who married Elisabeth Grant in 1932, and later on October 1, 1947, he married Rebekah Semple West Pierce (1915–1982).

Harkness died in New York City in 1919 and was buried in the Woodlawn Cemetery in The Bronx, New York. He left an estate of $53,439,437, which would be approximately $992 million in 2025 dollars, of which $37,272,254 was stock in Standard Oil. He left half of his estate including his houses at 12 East 53rd Street in New York City and Dosoris at Glen Cove, New York to his wife Edith Hale Harkness. The remaining half was divided between his daughter Louise Hale Harkness and his son William Hale Harkness.

== Sources ==
- Klein, Henry H. Dynastic America and Those Who Own It (1921) reprint 2003 Kessinger Publishing. ISBN 978-0-7661-6729-2
