= Charles Moran (railroad executive) =

American businessman

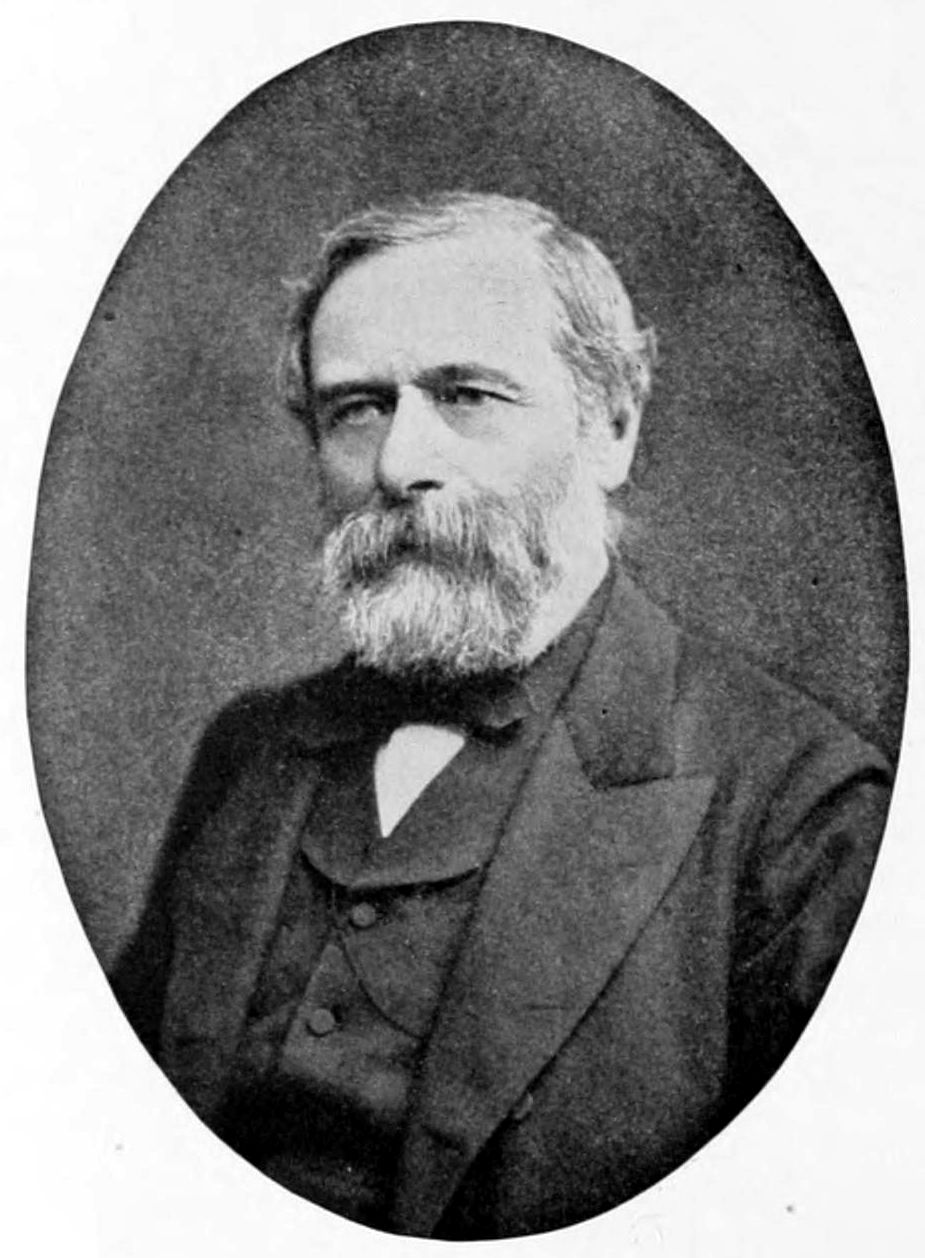
- Born: October 31, 1811; Brussels, Belgium
- Died: July 22, 1895 (aged 83)
- Occupation: executive
- Known for: president of the Erie Railroad

Charles Moran (October 31, 1811 – July 22, 1895) was an American business man and president of the Erie Railroad from 1857 to 1859.

== Biography ==
Charles Moran was born in Brussels, Belgium, in 1811. He came to New York City while a young man and engaged in business, becoming in time senior partner in the dry-goods commission and importing house of Moran and Iselin. This firm was dissolved in 1852, Mr. Moran retiring. He had won an enviable reputation as a careful and successful businessman, and as his bent was toward finance, he founded the New York banking house of Moran Bros. The foreign correspondence of the house was particularly extensive and of high class, which gave Mr. Moran an extraordinary opportunity for the placing of American loans abroad.

His success in this way in 1856, with a large Erie loan, made him a conspicuous figure in railroad financiering and turned the attention of the Erie toward him in a time of emergency and induced it to call him to the management of its critical affairs. He became president of the company on the eve of the great financial upheaval of 1857, the disastrous effects of which hampered his earnest efforts in the herculean tasks he had undertaken, all through his two years of administration. Few men would have faced the obstacles he encountered, much less have attempted to overcome them. Mr. Moran retired from the Erie management, August 1859, and gave his entire attention to his banking business. In the later portion of his life, Moran lived at 12 East 53rd Street in New York City. He continued as senior partner of Moran Bros until his death, July 22, 1895. Charles Moran had two sons, Amedee Depau Moran and D. Comyn Moran, who succeeded him in his banking business.

== Work ==
=== Election as director in 1854 ===
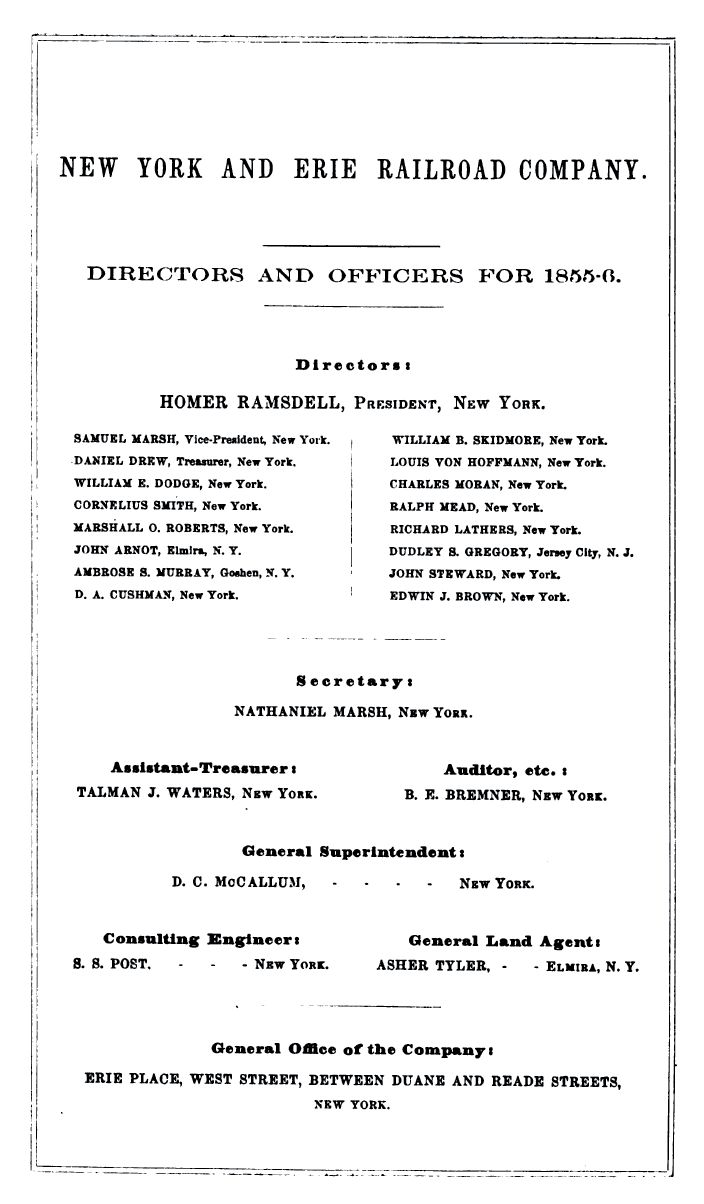
Listing of Erie directors and officers, 1855–56

In 1854, Charles Moran, broker and private banker, and Louis Von Hoffman, private banker, both from New York City, were elected among the 16 directors of the New York and Erie Company. This election was in recognition of the interests of foreign creditors of the company, Moran having placed a large amount of the company's unsecured, or income, bonds in Switzerland and other parts of Europe. Moran soon became one of Homer Ramsdell's confidants.

When in 1854, Ramsdell acquired the land besides water frontage at the Hudson River, where the immense Erie Railroad yards, depots, and ferry would be situated; no one on the board knew except Charles Moran. They thought the matter of new railroads, improvements, and lake steam should not be talked about in the best interests of the company. Work on the terminal facilities at Jersey City was begun in 1856. In June of that year, the Mallory and Co. of Newburgh began putting the tunnel through Bergen Hill, which would be finished under James P. Kirkwood.

=== Selection as president ===
In 1857, misfortune marked Erie, and the company's affairs evidently were once more approaching a crisis. This situation confronted the Erie when Charles Moran returned from Europe in July 1857, where he had gone the previous winter to raise loans. Homer Ramsdell had private enterprises of much magnitude, and the increasing depression in the business affairs of the company, he declared, required that he should give them more of his personal attention, and he announced his determination to resign the presidency of the company. The board of directors had been led to believe that Charles Moran, better than any other person available, could take hold of the company's critical affairs and straighten them out. They notified him of their belief and solicited him to take charge of the management.

He replied that he would undertake the task, with assurances that he could perform it if the company would pay him $25,000 a year for his services. This was as much as the President of the United States was paid and an unheard-of salary for the executive head of any corporation. The board decided, however, that Moran was worth the outlay, and they agreed to his terms. July 18, 1887, William E. Dodge, who was outraged because the company persisted in permitting work to be done on the railroad on Sunday, resigned from the board. Moran was chosen in his place and was elected unanimously as president, with Mr. Ramsdell continuing as a member of the board.

The public press announced that Mr. Moran, upon his election as president of the Erie, was a man of high character and integrity, of vigorous mind, and devoted to the study of political economy, "which was at the foundation of the success of any work of this description; that he had superior administrative ability, and that his election would give great satisfaction to all true friends of the enterprise, both at home and abroad." All this about Mr. Moran was undoubtedly true, but within the next two years, he was to learn by bitter experience that it required something more than devotion "to the study of political economy" to be "at the foundation of the success" of such a work as the New York and Erie Railroad was.

=== Moran's policy changes ===
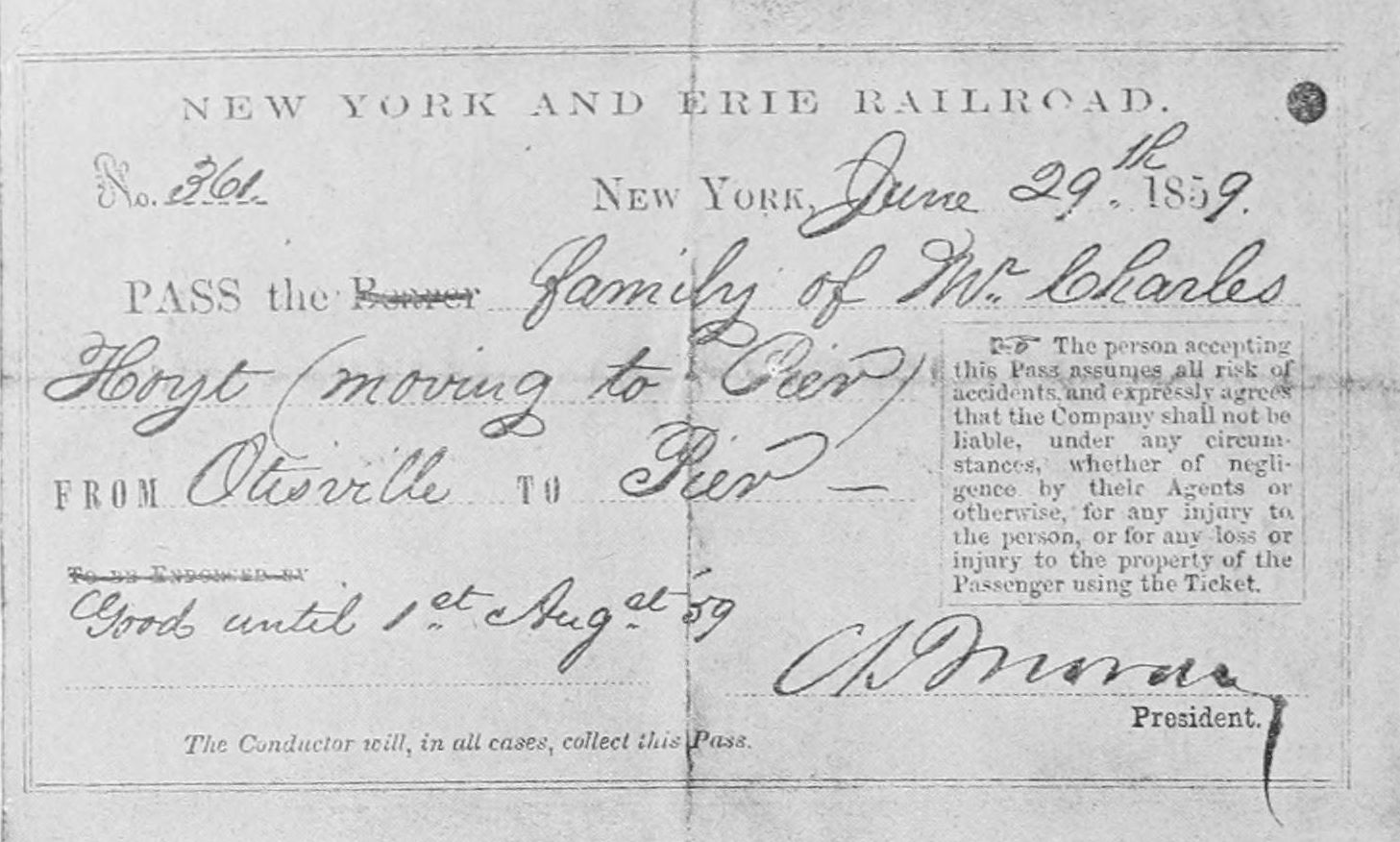
Free Pass by Moran, 1859

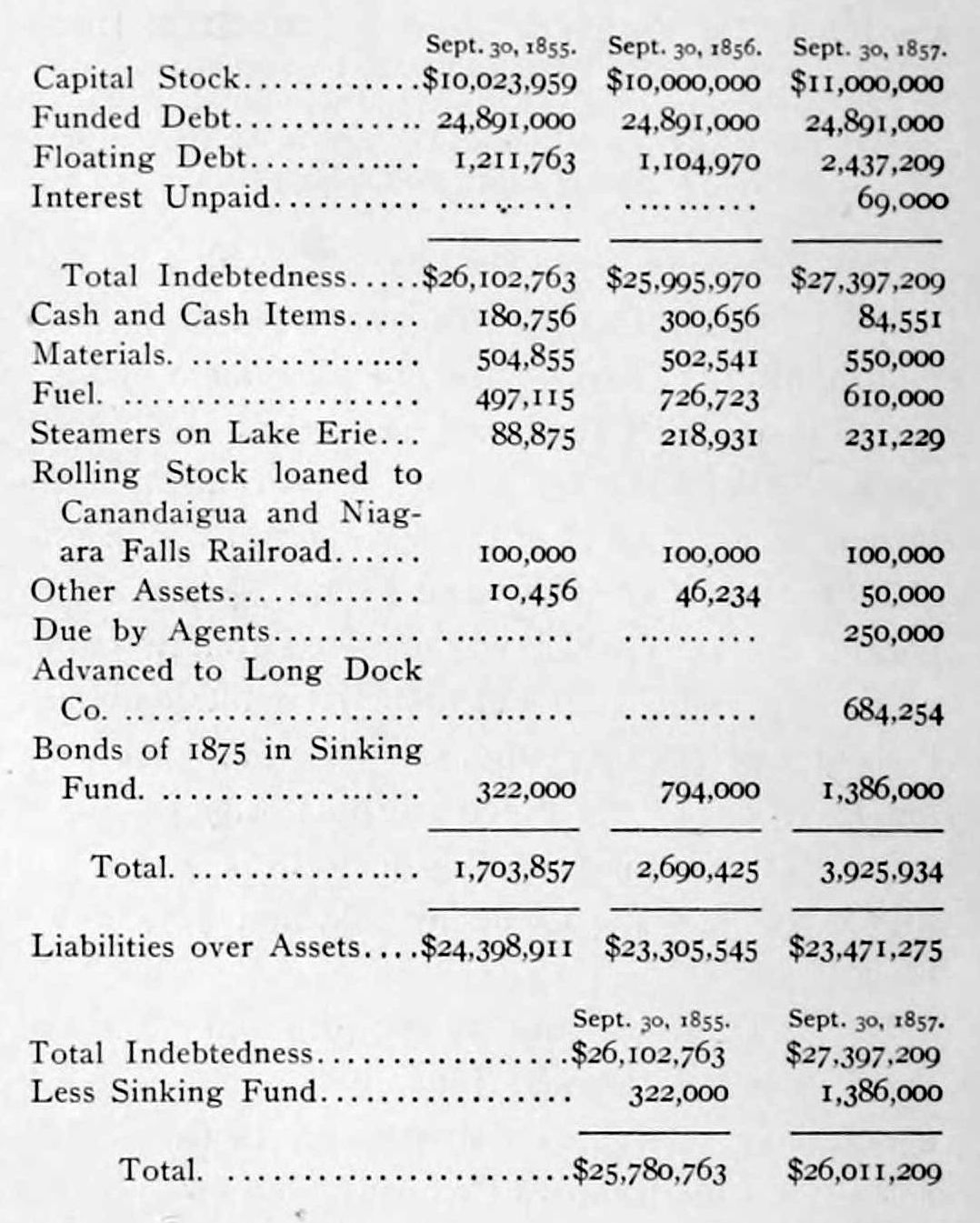
Erie financial conditions, 1857

Early in his incumbency, President Moran demonstrated that his policy was to be radically different in the management of the company's affairs from those of any of his predecessors. One custom had been, as a bid for new business and an inducement to retain old, to issue free passes to drovers who accompanied their cattle to market on the stock trains, and to "freighters", who controlled produce shipments in those days. About 160 persons were receiving these free tickets, and the issuing of them had been regarded as good business policy by all managements up to the Moran control. Moran did not believe it was a sound business principle, and he abolished the free pass system at once. He also dispensed with agencies, runners, advertisements, and all such methods of increasing the company's business.

Money was necessary to carry forward the improvements the company had then in hand, but which were being delayed by lack of funds, so a scheme for a fourth mortgage loan was announced early in August 1857. It was proposed to raise $3,000,000 by creating a stock for $6,000,000, half to be paid in cash and half in the unsecured bonds of the company. The object of the loan was to fund the debt of the company and to obtain means to continue the construction of the Bergen tunnel, the depots, wharves, and other improvements of the Long Dock property. The debt of the company was calculated to be increased by about $1,000,000 with this plan.

It was a discouraging time for negotiating loans, however, even on the most approved security, since it was at the height of the panic of 1857, when banks were failing by the score, and the oldest business houses were trembling on the verge of bankruptcy; President Moran and his associates went to work, though, in earnest to place the new bonds. The unsecured bonds of the company were low in the market being then quoted at about 35 and the terms of the new issue were favorable, but investors ignored it.

A meeting of the stock and bondholders was held at No. 13 Broad Street, New York, September 23, 1857, for the purpose of inducing them to subscribe for the new loan. President Moran made an address which is today a graphic and in some respects an amusing exhibit of the company's situation and tribulations in that critical year. He began by presenting a statement of the financial condition of the company (see image).

=== December 1857 strike ===
The most important difficulty with which the road had to contend, Moran explained in 1857, was the engineers' strike of the fall of 1856:

"... Owing to a policy which occupied itself with minutiae to the exclusion of the main chance, the best set of engineers ever gathered in this country was dispersed. They spread reports all over the country unfavorable to the Erie road; they said it was served by incompetent engineers, by mere boys, and what they said was in part true. The strike was followed by a December and a January change in weather by which the road was blocked by snows, and an inundation in February which destroyed the most important bridges on the line. Constant rains kept the road in a state of liquefaction until July, and the result of all this was that during the first six months of the present fiscal year there had been a diminution of receipts of $534,000, and an increase of expenditure of $482,000, leaving a comparative balance against the Company of $1,016,000. Notwithstanding this loss the road has gone ahead within the last two years between four hundred and five hundred thousand dollars. If, under such unfavorable circumstances as these, such results could be obtained, what would they not be when the large crops of this year came in, and when economical and active management had made the road as productive as possible?"

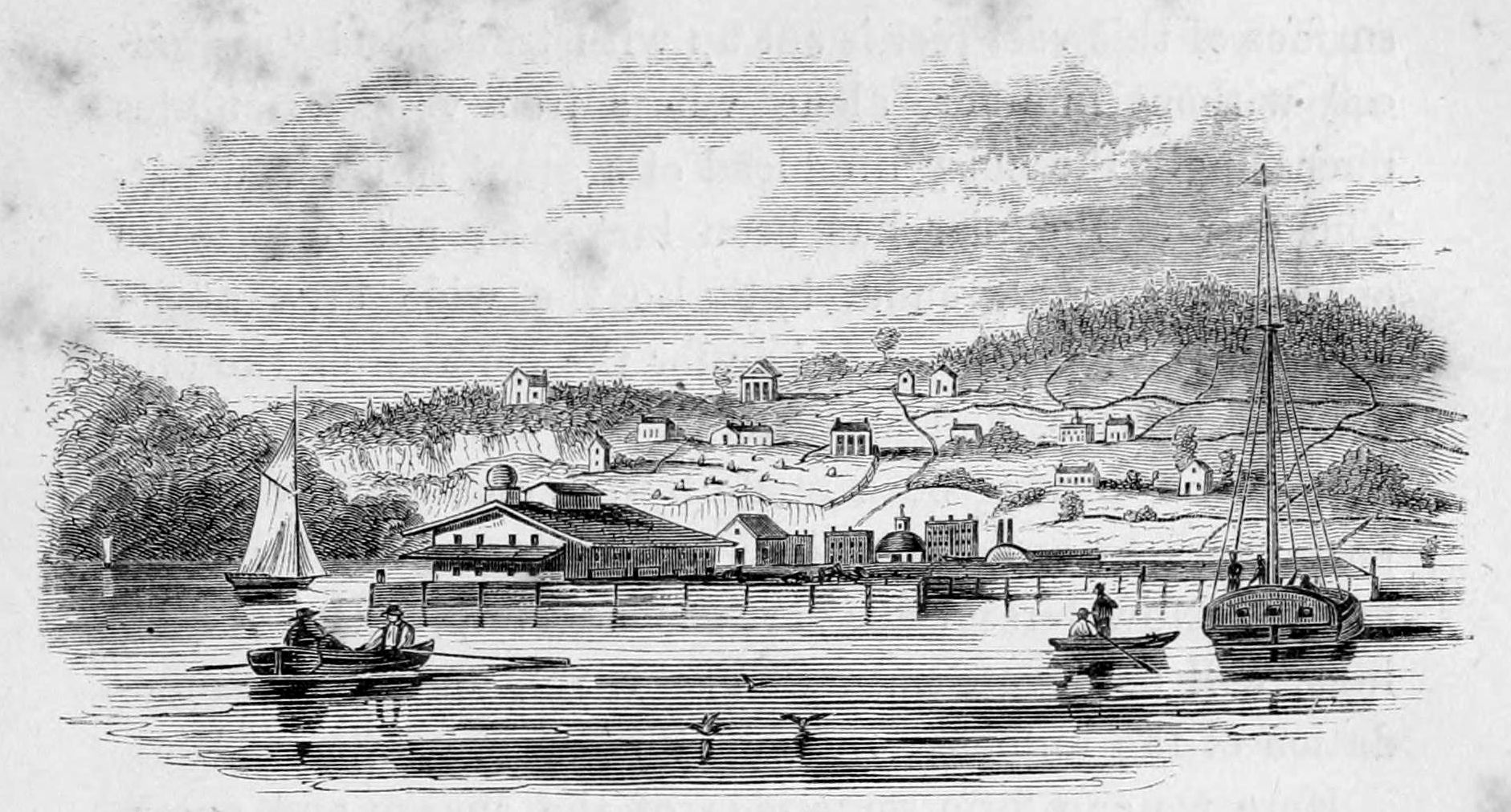
Pier at Piermont and Erie Railroad terminal in the 1850s

By the end of the year on Tuesday, December 1, 1887, by order of President Charles Moran, a reduction of wages and salaries of employees went into effect, owing to the hard times and the critical condition. About 250 laborers were at the pier at Piermont, handling freight. They were divided into night and day gangs, and were known as laborers, checkers, tally clerks, porters, and stowers. Their pay had been $1 per day. It was reduced to 90 cents for 11 hours' work. Six hours were reckoned half a day's work. Steady men could make from $25 to $30 a month at the old wages.

President Moran was getting a salary of $25,000 a year, and it was current all along the railroad that owing to financial straits the company was in, he was taking no chances, but was collecting his salary, pro rata, every day. When his order to reduce wages and salaries was issued, inquiry was made by the men as to whether the president hid submitted to a reduction in his own great stipend. When they learned that he had not, their feelings were bitter, and the laborers at the Piermont docks protested against the cut in their wages and quit work. The brakemen on that division of the railroad joined the laborers, as did the laborers along the division. Traffic came to a standstill. The strike was broken later that week by metropolitan policemen and Piermont guards. These strikes eventually cost the Company $0.5 to 1.0 million.

=== Bankruptcy and resignation ===
The last "Address of the Directors of the New York and Erie Railroad Company to the Stockholders", in early 1859, gave an impression of the depressing situation, stating:

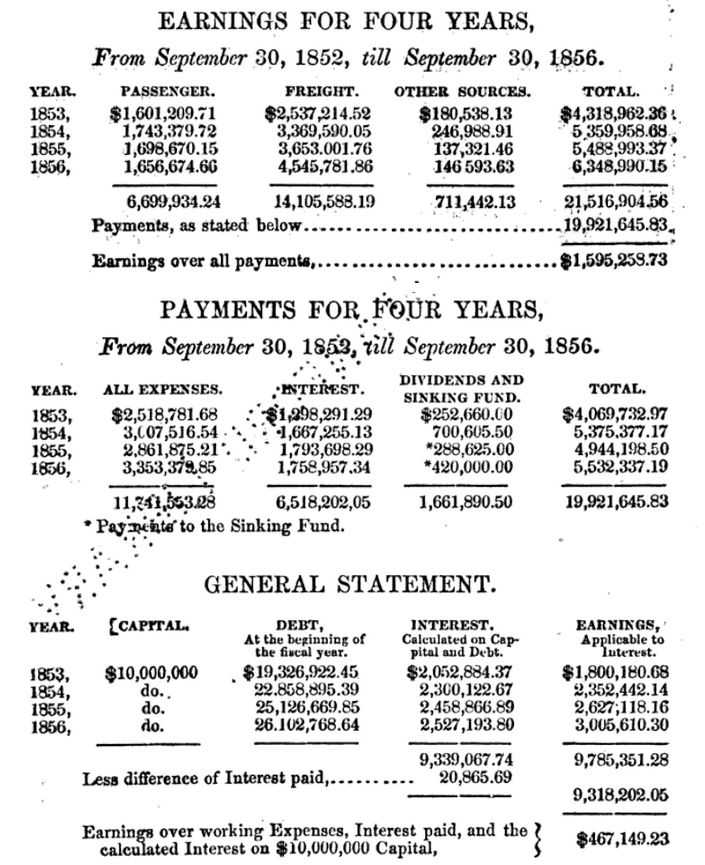
New York and Erie Railroad Company's affairs, 1852–56

"The depression in the market value of the Shares and Bonds of the New York and Erie R. R. Company, increasing from month to month and from week to week, indicates a fear that the whole stock may in a short time be lost, and some of the unsecured debt share the same fate. These fears are not without foundation, but they may by energetic proceedings be removed. It is evidently to the forbearance of the Creditors that the Company owes its continued existence. This lenity must grow out of the belief that there is a real, though at present unavailable, value in the property of the Company, which in time will again become apparent..."

The address further gives an overview of company's development in the 1850s, and continued to stipulate its decline, and its origins:

"...remembering as they may, that for four years, commencing on 1 October 1852, when the trains first ran through from Jersey City to Dunkirk, and ending September 30, 1856, the earnings over all working expenses paid the interest on the debts, and left a surplus more than sufficient to pay full interest to the Stockholders; though 'part of that surplus went to the general improvements. The figures and facts are not to be found in any one publication,' and therefore may with advantage be collected here, as the commencement of an attempt to understand the real condition of the Company's affairs."
"The 30 September 1856, marks the culminating point in the success of the Company. The road was good, and its equipments in cars, locomotives and every thing necessary for doing a large business, were nearly all that could be desired. From thence, its decline may be dated. The old and experienced enginemen were at that time discharged. Those substituted for them, though competent and careful, could not at once run the trains as economically as had before been usual. But they acquitted themselves well. No accident happened to car or passenger in the months of October, November and December; and the earnings of the road for that period, being the first quarter of the fiscal year ending September 30, 1857, amounted to $1,605,582.42, a. sum which with one exception had never been exceeded in the same quarter. It left, after paying all working expenses and interest on the bonded and floating debt, as net surplus earnings, $207,447.53. After this, the real decline began, with a hard winter, destructive spring freshets, and imaginary improvements by a new President..."

This address continued with more recent events, but could not turn the tide. Up to August 1859, of the loan, only $1,253,500 had been taken. The hopeless state of entanglement in the affairs of the company culminated on the 4th of that month in the recovery of a judgment against it for $35,000 default in sinking fund bonds, and an execution was issued the same day. Other suits were pending in which the same questions were involved, and it became plain that if the bondholders wished to protect the property of the corporation, and hold it together against a reorganization, some steps must be taken at once.

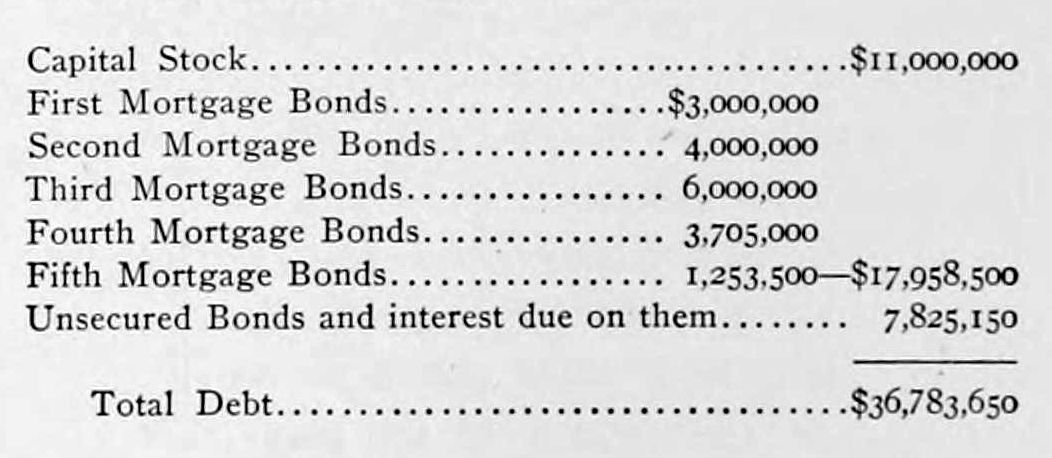
Erie bond dept. and capital stock, 1859

Proceedings were begun by the trustees of the fourth mortgage, default having also been made on the first, second, third, and fifth mortgages. On motion thus made, Nathaniel Marsh, Secretary of the company, was appointed Receiver by Judge Mason of Chenango County. He took possession of the road on August 16, 1859. On the 19th the Directors made a large reduction in President Moran's salary. On the 27th he resigned as president, and retired from the Directory. Samuel Marsh was elected president to succeed him. When Moran left, the capital stock of the company was $11,000,000 and the bonded debt was $36,783,650 (see image).

Erie stock in July 1857, when the Moran administration began, was quoted at $33 1/3. In August 1859, when the Moran administration ended, the stock was wavering at $8. Undoubtedly, Charles Moran made an earnest and conscientious endeavor to extricate the company from its troubles and start it forward on a successful career. According to Mott (1899; p. 129), "his ability to do so had been simply misjudged and overrated – and by nobody more than by himself."

=== Money, 1863 ===
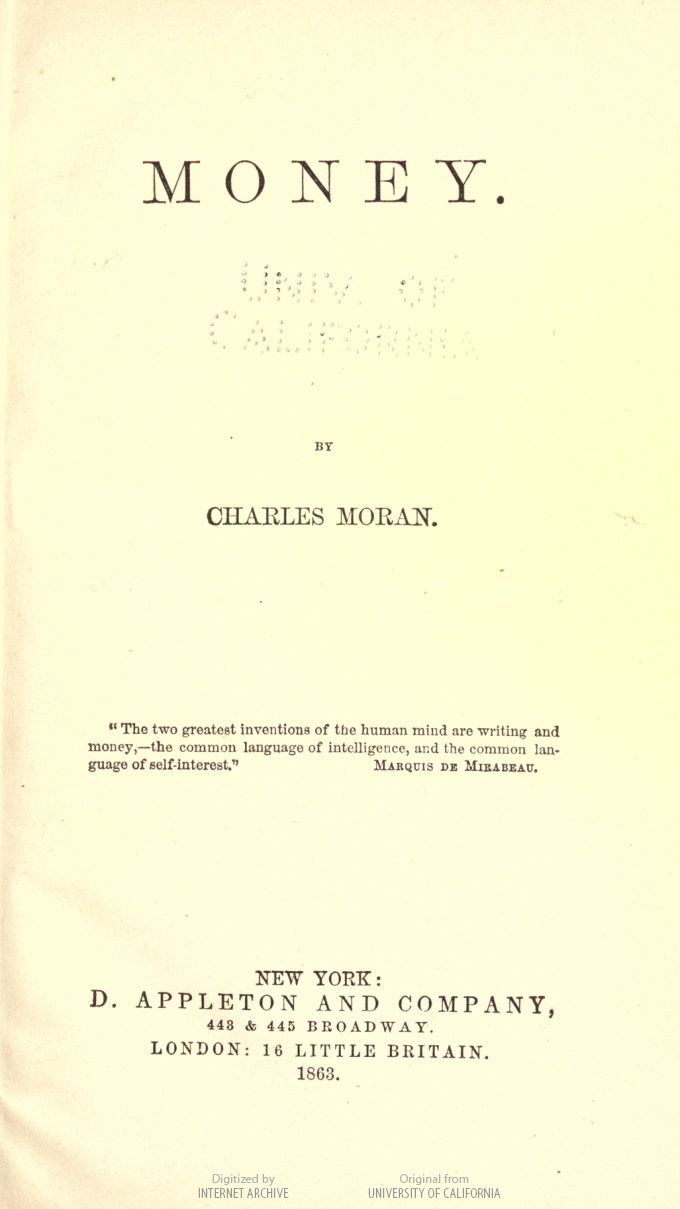
Title page Money, 1863

In 1851, Moran had published in the local press some of his views in regard to the relative value of gold and silver and the effects of the large influx of gold from new mines. In the 1860s, he further developed these ideas in discussions at the meetings of the Society for the Advancement of Political and Social Science in New York City. This gradually assumed the form of a work, which is an attempt to analyze and discuss the subject of money, in its most important, practical phases. Moran wanted to describe this subject more fully than has been done in any of the works that have, and explain and reconcile all the anomalies that, heretofore, have rendered money so vexed a subject.

His 1863 book Money built on his earlier publications. Moran further explains that "every prediction then made on this subject has been fully realized, while not one of those made by the partisans of the theory of the future depreciation of gold and appreciation of silver has been fulfilled. The conclusions in regard to the effect on prices, of bank-note issues, were arrived at and communicated to friends long before reading trie able works of Fullarton and Tooke, in which similar views are maintained. This is mentioned here, not so much to claim the merit of originality for these conclusions, as with a view to obtain for them the weight due to conclusions arrived at by different parties, examining the same subject from different points of view."

A late 1863 article in British Westminster Review commented that "Mr. Moran's Essay on Money is but another added to the heap of such publications as have long since tired all human patience. Writers of his school will never be brought to recognise the difference between currency and credit. Their theory is, that because credit is the basis of all extended commerce, the banking system of a country should be so constituted as to come to the rescue of a credit destroyed by injudicious investments in times of overtrading and speculation..."

=== Owner of the Nevada and California Railroad ===
The Nevada and Oregon Railroad, a narrow-gauge line, found in 1882 to be building from north from Reno, was sold to its largest investor, the Moran Brothers, a group of New York investors, at foreclosure in 1884 and operated unofficially as the Nevada and California Railroad. In 1893, the Moran Brothers sold the railroad, and it was reorganized as the Nevada–California–Oregon Railway. His presence in Lassen County, California, continues to this day with the town/place of Moran bearing his last name, as well as Amadee, the name of his son.

== Publications ==
- Moran, Charles (1863). Money. New York: D. Appleton and Company – via Internet Archive.
- Moran, Charles (1885). Charles Moran, Complainant, Vs. the Pittsburgh, Cincinnati and St. Louis Railway Company, the Cincinnati and Muskingum Valley Railway Company, Samuel Jones [et Al.] Respondents: In Equity; Bill of Complaint of Charles Moran. Robert Clarke & Company.

Business positions
Preceded by Homer Ramsdell	President of Erie Railroad; 1857–1859	Succeeded by Samuel Marsh
