= 12 East 53rd Street =

Building in Manhattan, New York

Fisk–Harkness House
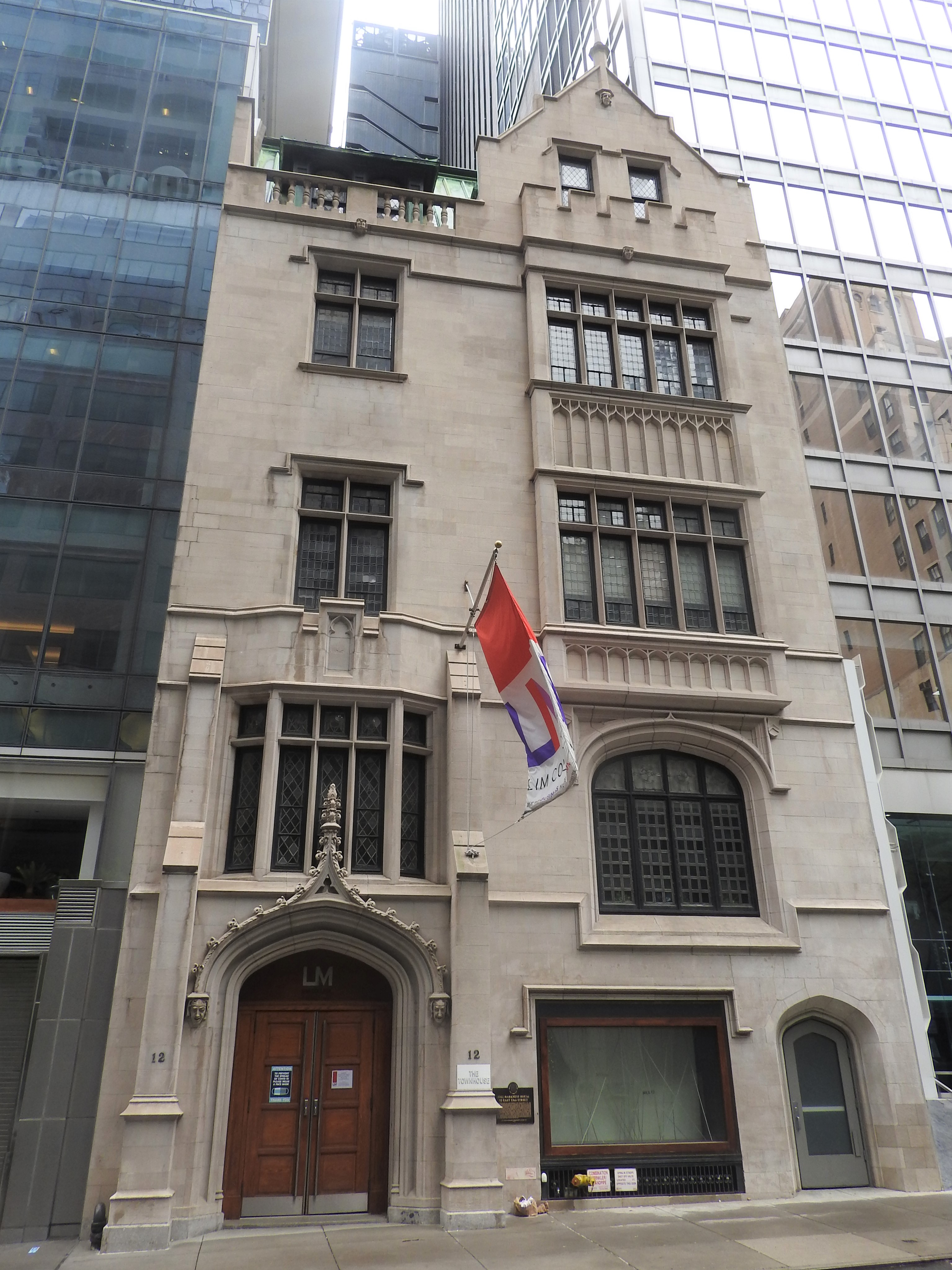
- Seen from the north
- Interactive map of the Fisk–Harkness House area

General information
- Location: 12 East 53rd Street, Manhattan, New York, United States
- Coordinates: 40°45′36″N 73°58′30″W
- Current tenants: Dimitry Goncharov
- Completed: 1871
- Renovated: 1904–1906
- Client: Charles Moran (original house); Harvey and Mary Fisk (renovation)

Technical details
- Floor count: 6

Design and construction
- Architect: Griffith Thomas

New York City Landmark
- Designated: November 22, 2016
- Reference no.: 2577

12 East 53rd Street, also the Fisk–Harkness House, is a building in the Midtown Manhattan neighborhood of New York City, United States. It is along the south side of 53rd Street between Madison Avenue and Fifth Avenue. The six-story building was designed by Griffith Thomas and was constructed in 1871. It was redesigned in the Tudor-inspired Gothic Revival style in 1906 by Raleigh C. Gildersleeve.

The house had originally been designed as a four-story brownstone townhouse with a stoop, a raised basement, and a flat roof behind a galvanized-iron cornice. The present appearance of the house is a limestone structure designed in the Tudor-inspired Gothic Revival style. The asymmetrical facade contains two vertical bays, with a large main entrance on the left (east) bay and a triangular dormer on the right (west) bay. The interior floors of Thomas's original design were substantially altered to allow the three middle stories to have tall ceilings.

The house was constructed for banking executive Charles Moran as a rowhouse with a brownstone facade, and a rear extension was constructed in the 1880s. The house was remodeled for Harvey and Mary Fisk, who bought the house in 1905. The Fisks sold it four years later to William Harkness and his wife Edith Harkness, the latter of whom sold the house in 1923. The house was then used for commercial tenants including art dealer Proctor & Company, the Automobile Club of America, and art dealer Symons Galleries. The building was owned by LIM College from 1964 to 2024, when it was sold to obstetrician Dimitry Goncharov. The New York City Landmarks Preservation Commission designated the house as an official landmark in 2010.

== Site ==
12 East 53rd Street is along the southern sidewalk of 53rd Street, between Madison Avenue and Fifth Avenue, in the Midtown Manhattan neighborhood of New York City, United States. The land lot is slightly irregular and covers 4,250 square feet (395 m^{2}), with a frontage of 37.5 feet (11.4 m) and a maximum depth of 119.42 feet (36.40 m). The western section of the house extends only 100 feet (30 m) deep and is 12.5 feet (3.8 m) wide, while the eastern section of the house extends the full depth and is 25 feet (7.6 m) wide. The house is overhung by the adjacent office building at 510 Madison Avenue, finished in 2010. The house is across the street from Paley Park to the north and is on the same city block as the Omni Berkshire Place hotel to the southeast. Other nearby locations include 660 Fifth Avenue to the west; the Museum of Modern Art (MoMA) to the northwest; the William H. Moore House to the north; the DuMont Building and Hotel Elysée to the northeast; 488 Madison Avenue and the John Peirce Residence to the south; and the Olympic Tower, Cartier Building, and 647 Fifth Avenue to the southwest.

Fifth Avenue between 42nd Street and Central Park South (59th Street) was relatively undeveloped through the late 19th century. The surrounding area was once part of the common lands of the city of New York. The Commissioners' Plan of 1811 established Manhattan's street grid with lots measuring 100 feet (30 m) deep and 25 feet (7.6 m) wide. Upscale residences were constructed around Fifth Avenue following the American Civil War. The block of East 53rd Street from Fifth to Madison Avenues was only sporadically developed until the late 1870s, and it had brownstone residences by 1886.

== Architecture ==
The house had originally been designed by Griffith Thomas, of the firm T. Thomas & Son, as a four-story brownstone townhouse with a stoop, raised basement, and a flat roof behind a galvanized-iron cornice. The present appearance of the house was designed by Raleigh Colston Gildersleeve for businessman Harvey Edward Fisk. The current house is six stories tall, with a limestone facade designed in the Tudor-inspired Gothic Revival style. The interior floors of Thomas's original design were substantially altered to allow the three middle stories to have tall ceilings.

=== Facade ===
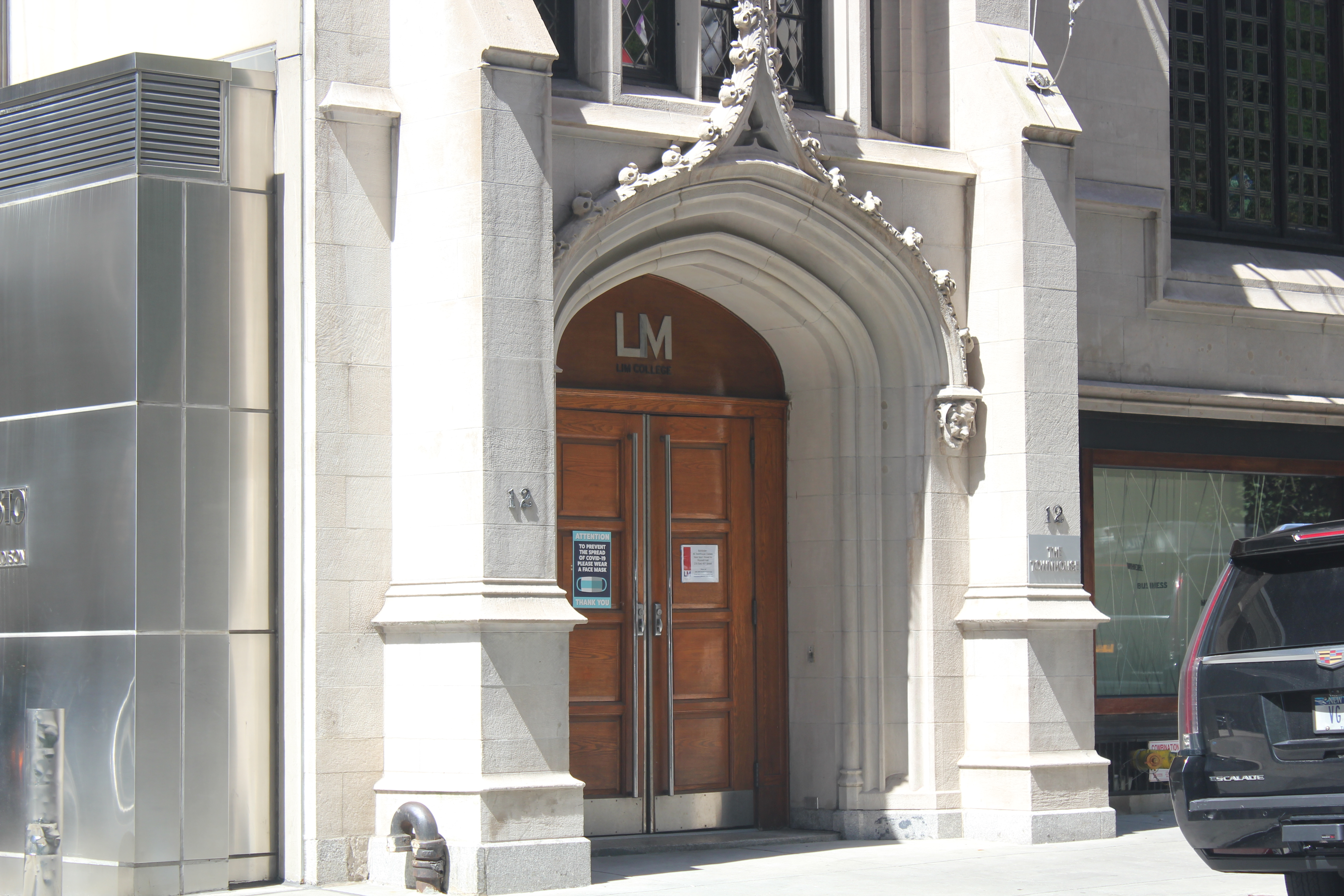
View of the main entrance

The building's 53rd Street facade is asymmetrical and is divided into two vertical bays. At ground level, the main entrance portal is a four-centered arch in the left bay, which includes a wood-and-metal double door. The main entrance is topped by a crocketed molding and flanked by stepped buttresses. The right bay contains a show window above a metal grille, which dates to a 1922 renovation. The far right portion of the facade has a secondary entrance with a metal-and-glass door. In the initial design, the house's entrance on a stoop slightly above ground. as in other rowhouses, and the stoop was placed on one side of the facade.

The second through fourth stories generally contain leaded-glass windows as well as vertical stone mullions and horizontal stone transoms. On the second story, the eastern (left) bay is topped by tracery, while the western (right) bay contains a window inside a Tudor arch. The stone tracery, mullions, and transoms on the right bay of the second story have been removed. A flagpole projects from the center of the second story. On the third and fourth stories, the left bay has simpler windows than the right bay, which is placed within a two-story oriel window. The fifth story has a balustrade and balcony on the left bay, behind which is a flat copper roof and a dormer window. On the fifth story, the right bay has a gable with two dormer windows, above which is a parapet and crenellations; the right bay is topped by a pinnacle. The western and eastern facades are party walls that are painted to resemble the limestone facade; the western party wall has a chimney.

=== Features ===
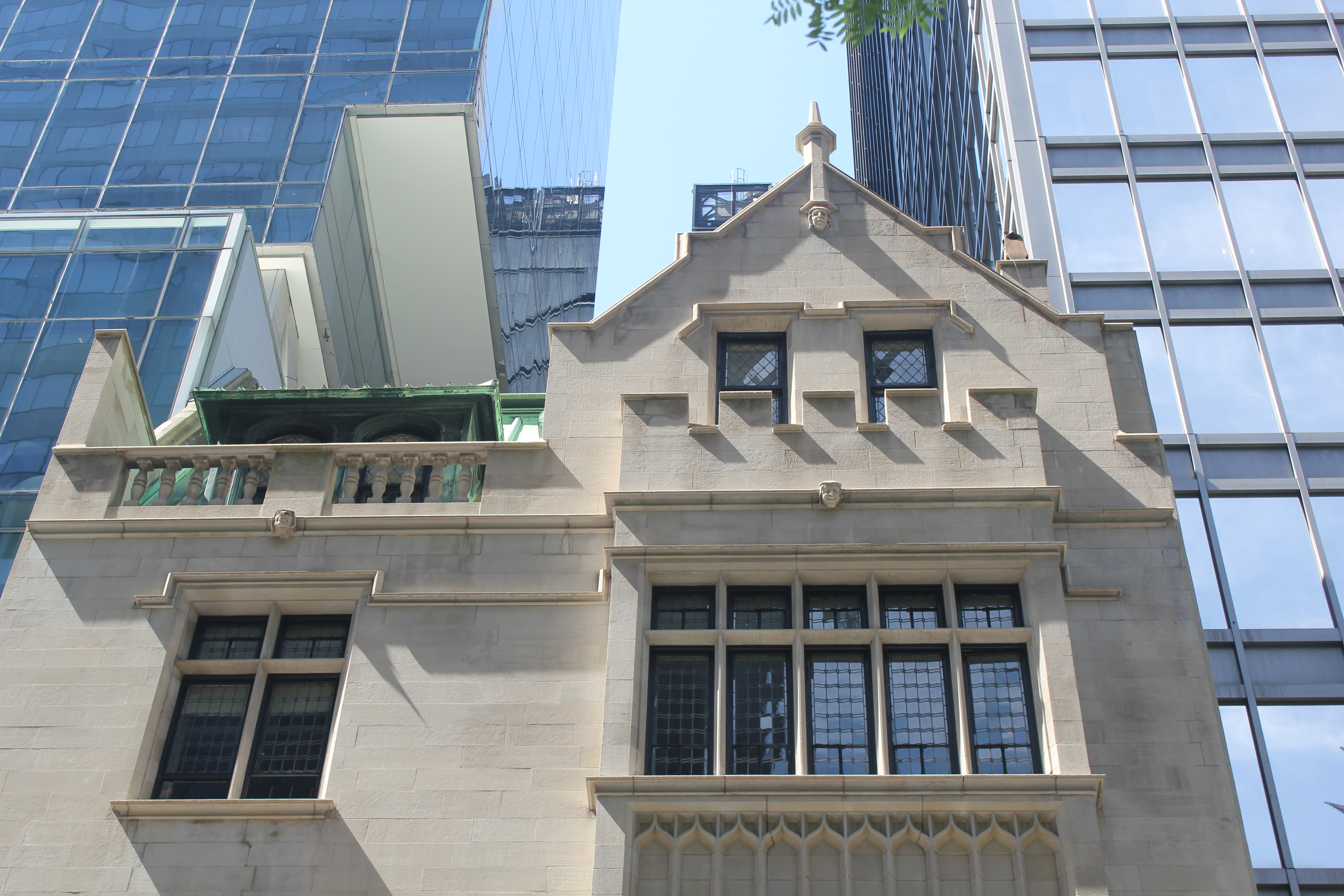
Top stories

According to the New York City Department of City Planning, the building has a gross floor area of 18,934 square feet (1,759.0 m^{2}). The atypically deep lot allowed the construction of three deep rooms in the rear. The main floor had a large reception room in front, a large music room in the middle, and a dining room at the rear that was lit from all sides. The ceilings of these rooms were about as high as two stories of an average dwelling. The reception room probably had a staircase at the center. The house's other floors had similar high ceilings. The house as a whole was originally designed with Tudor-style furnishings to complement the exterior. When the Fisk family occupied the house, it contained European artifacts such as tapestries, furniture, and paintings, which formed an atmosphere that historian Andrew Dolkart describes as "olde English". These objects also served as a symbol of the Fisks' cultural tastes and wealth.

When the building was converted into a clubhouse for the Automobile Club of America in 1925, the second story was redesigned as a restaurant and the decorative ceiling was kept. The third floor was refitted as the lounge, library, card rooms, and a large sitting room. The fourth story was arranged with men's and women's baths, lockers, and dressing rooms. The basement had the general supply department; the main floors had the touring, supply, and map departments; and the upper stories had executive offices. The house was renovated into the showroom of art dealer Symons Galleries in 1938; tapestries, paintings, porcelains, bronze objects, Gothic art, and Renaissance jewelry were displayed in different rooms. One room with carved oak and a stone mantel was devoted to Jacobean culture, while another was devoted to French culture.

== History ==
=== Early history ===
The site of 12 East 53rd Street was acquired in 1871 by Charles Moran, member of the banking firm Moran Brothers. In June 1871, he bought a lot on the south side of 53rd Street about 250 feet (76 m) east of Fifth Avenue, with a frontage of 12.5 feet (3.8 m) and a depth of 100 feet (30 m). The next month, Moran acquired a lot immediately to the west, measuring 50 by 100 feet (15 by 30 m), and an adjacent lot at 11 East 52nd Street, measuring 25 by 100 feet (7.6 by 30.5 m). Moran intended to use the lots along 52nd Street for his horse stables. Griffith Thomas was hired to design a four-story brownstone townhouse for Moran on 53rd Street. The house's site originally measured 37.5 by 100 feet (11.4 by 30.5 m). During the mid-1880s, the lot's depth was extended by 19 feet (5.8 m). This allowed the construction of a rear annex.

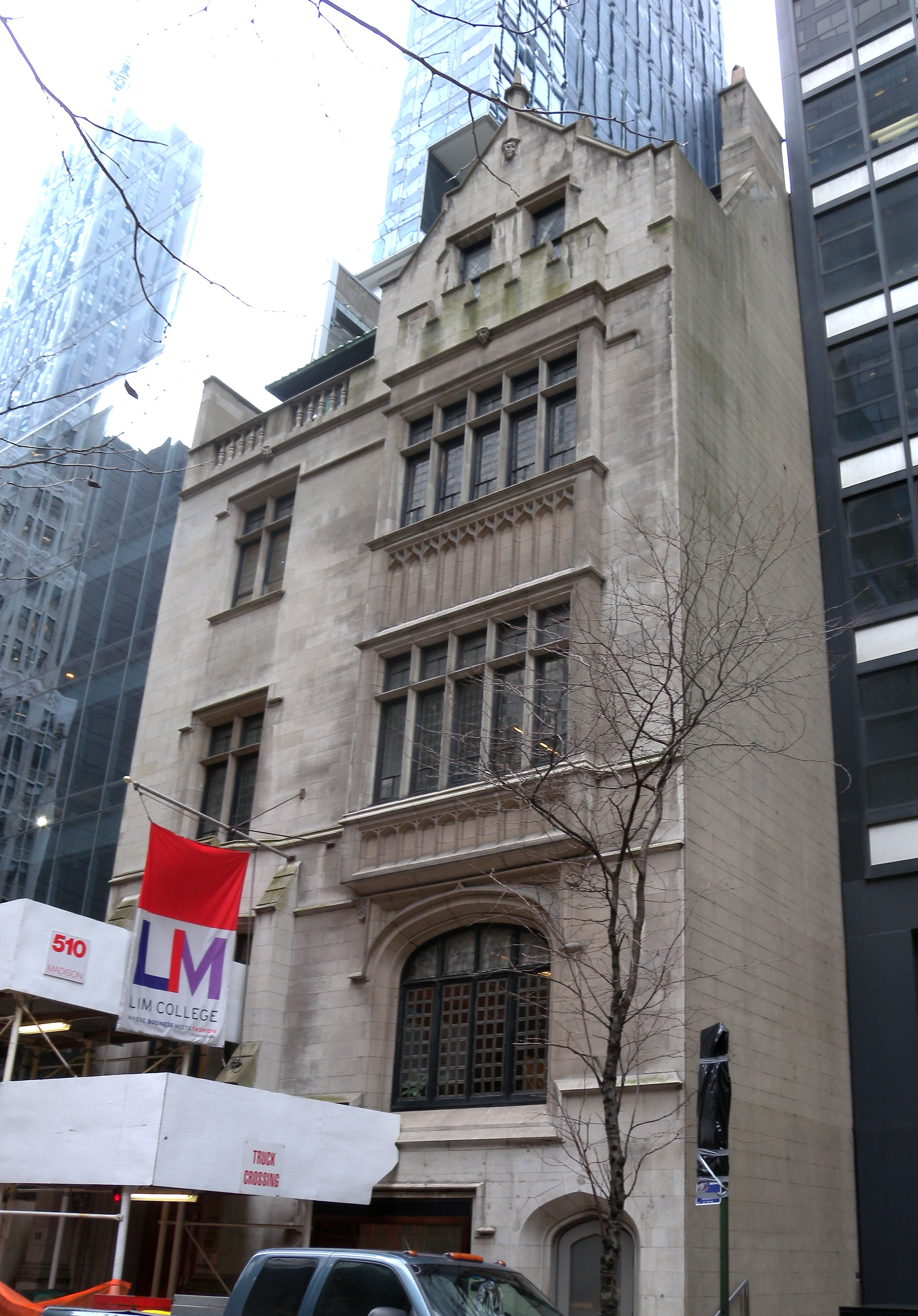
Facade of the redesigned townhouse

Moran died at his house in 1895 and bequeathed his estate to his widow Arabella and four children. The following March, Douglas Robinson & Co. sold Moran's 53rd Street house as well as his 52nd Street stables. The house was then occupied by Walter G. Oakman. When the Oakman family lived in the house, it hosted events such as an annual meeting for the Society of Colonial Dames of the State of New York, as well as a discussion of political affairs in Crete. The executors of the Moran estate sold the house in 1899. Architecture firm Hert & Tallant filed plans for renovations in 1902, which were projected to cost $5,000. Oakman was reported to have sold the house in May 1905. Around the same time, the ownership of the house at 12 East 53rd Street and the stables at 11 East 52nd Street was split, and the lot line between the two buildings was shifted about 19 feet (5.8 m) south.

=== Fisk and Harkness residence ===
Harvey Edward Fisk and his wife Mary Fisk were recorded in June 1905 as the new owners of the house. They hired Raleigh Colston Gildersleeve to renovate the house extensively, as well as to design a country estate in Elberon, New Jersey. Plans for the renovation, projected to cost $25,000, were filed in November 1905. The improvements included extending the building forward by 8.5 feet (2.6 m); adding a story to the rear; and installing new stairs, an electric elevator, a new facade, and an interior structure. The facade was redesigned in the neo-Tudor style with Gothic design elements. Contracts for the work had not been awarded at the time. Work started in January 1906 and was completed that August. The Fisk family lived in the house for only four years before they had to sell it to raise money.

The building was sold in October 1909 to lawyer William L. Harkness, a cousin of Standard Oil executive Edward Harkness, along with William's wife Edith. The price was recorded as being either $375,000 or $400,000. The New York Times described the building as "one of the finest residences in the Fifth Avenue section". The Harkness family hosted events at the house, including a fundraising benefit for a nursery and a debutante event for William and Edith's daughter Louise. William Harkness died at his country house in Glen Cove, New York, in 1919. He left half of his estate, including the 12 East 53rd Street house and the Glen Cove country house, to Edith. Their children Louise and William Hale Harkness received the other half of the estate.

=== Commercial uses ===
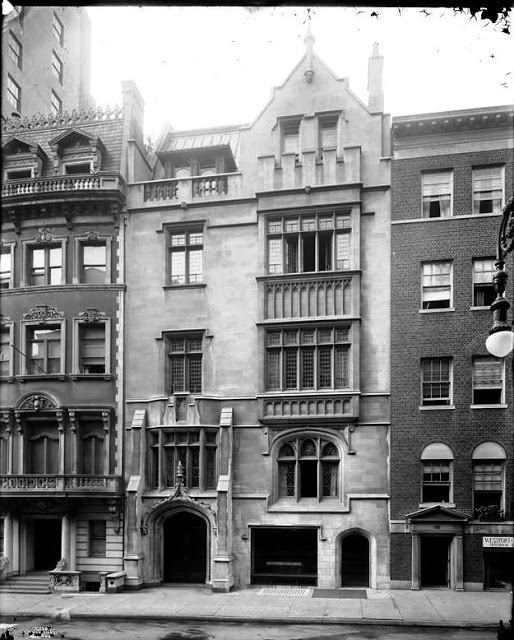
Depicted in 1925 as the Automobile Club of America clubhouse

In November 1921, the 12 East 53rd Street house was sold to art dealer Proctor & Company. Edith Harkness had been asking $400,000 for the property. Proctor & Company planned extensive alterations to the house before it moved in. Proctor & Company may have removed the original tracery and added a show window during this renovation. The company occupied 12 East 53rd Street for only two years before selling it in December 1923 to the Automobile Club of America, which planned to renovate the building into their clubhouse. The Fisk–Harkness House had 28,000 square feet (2,600 m^{2}), which represented an increase of 8,000 square feet (740 m^{2}) over the club's existing space in the automobile district south of Columbus Circle. Furthermore, 12 East 53rd Street was close to several other clubhouses along Fifth Avenue, including those of the University Club, Union Club, Calumet Club, Knickerbocker Club, and Metropolitan Club.

The Automobile Club of America received a $190,000 mortgage on the building in early 1924. After undergoing $100,000 worth of renovations, the clubhouse was dedicated in April 1925. The clubhouse was among the locations where New York license plates were distributed. Events hosted at the house included a luncheon with a League of Nations Non-Partisan Association official, an annual session of the National Highway Traffic Administration, as well as bridge games and tea dances. The club had a peak membership of 6,000, but following the Great Depression in the United States, several thousand members left the club. As a result, in January 1932, the Automobile Club's governors voted to dissolve the club. The building was placed for sale at a foreclosure auction that August, and it was sold to the Mutual Life Insurance Company of New York for $50,000. 12 East 53rd Street might have been vacant for six years after the foreclosure sale.

In August 1937, an apartment in the building was leased to Lucile Cody. The house was then leased in February 1938 to art dealer Symons Galleries Inc. The art dealer moved into the building that May after an extensive renovation. The stone mullions and transoms on the second-story window may have been removed during this time. By 1940, the upper floors were redesigned with apartments. The Mutual Life Insurance Company continued to own the building. The structures at 4 to 12 East 53rd Street, as well as the Frances Building at the southeast corner of 53rd Street and Fifth Avenue, were acquired in November 1943 by Robert W. Dowling of the City Investing Company. Advertising agency Maxon Inc. purchased the building from Dowling in December 1948, intending to use the structure for its own offices. Symons Galleries sold off its products in May 1949 in preparation for its relocation to smaller quarters.

Maxon Inc. moved into 12 East 53rd Street in January 1950 while renovations were still ongoing. Maxon Inc. continued to occupy the building until November 1964, when it sold the house to the Laboratory Institute of Merchandising, later LIM College. The college intended to renovate the building for its own use. LIM moved into the building afterward and continued to occupy it for the rest of the 20th century. 12 East 53rd Street became known as "the Townhouse" when LIM occupied it. LIM continued to occupy the house even after buying other structures for its campus in the 2000s. The New York City Landmarks Preservation Commission designated the building as a landmark in 2011. In August 2024, LIM College sold the building for $11 million to the obstetrician Dimitry Goncharov.

== See also ==
- List of New York City Designated Landmarks in Manhattan from 14th to 59th Streets
