= Homer Ramsdell =

American businessman

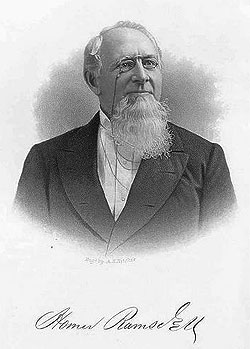
- Born: August 12, 1810; Warren, Massachusetts, United States
- Died: February 13, 1894; Newburgh, New York, United States
- Resting place: St. George's Cemetery (Newburgh, New York)
- Spouse: Frances Elizabeth Powell Ramsdell

Homer Ramsdell (August 12, 1810 – February 13, 1894) was an American businessman, known as president of the Erie Railroad from 1853 to 1857 as successor of Benjamin Loder.

== Biography ==
Ramsdell, in the 19th century one of the foremost citizen of Newburgh, New York, was born at Warren, Massachusetts, August 12, 1810. His father was Joseph Ramsdell. the fourth of that name in descent from Joseph and Martha (Bowker) Ramsdell, who emigrated from England to Plymouth, Massachusetts, in 1643. His mother was Ruth Stockbridge, of Hanover, Massachusetts, a descendant of John Stockbridge, who came from England in 1638. They were married at Hanover February 3, 1800, and moved to Warren, where the following children were born: Joseph, Mary and Homer.

In 1829, Ramsdell went to New York City, where he was employed in a dry goods store on Maiden Lane. Three years later he began business under the firm name of Ramsdell & Brown, dealers in silks and fancy white goods. On June 16, 1835, Ramsdell was married to Frances E. L. Powell, daughter of Thomas Powell, a prominent businessman of Newburgh.

Ramsdell continued his mercantile career until 1840, when he took up his permanent residence in Newburgh, superintending the various interests of his father-in-law, Thomas Powell, who was engaged in shipping and banking business there. In 1844 Ramsdell became a member of the firm of Thomas Powell & Co., and thenceforth until Powell's death in 1856 he was largely the administrator of Powell's affairs. By purchase and consolidation Ramsdell added other forwarding lines to his enterprises and soon stood at the head of the transportation business on the Hudson River.

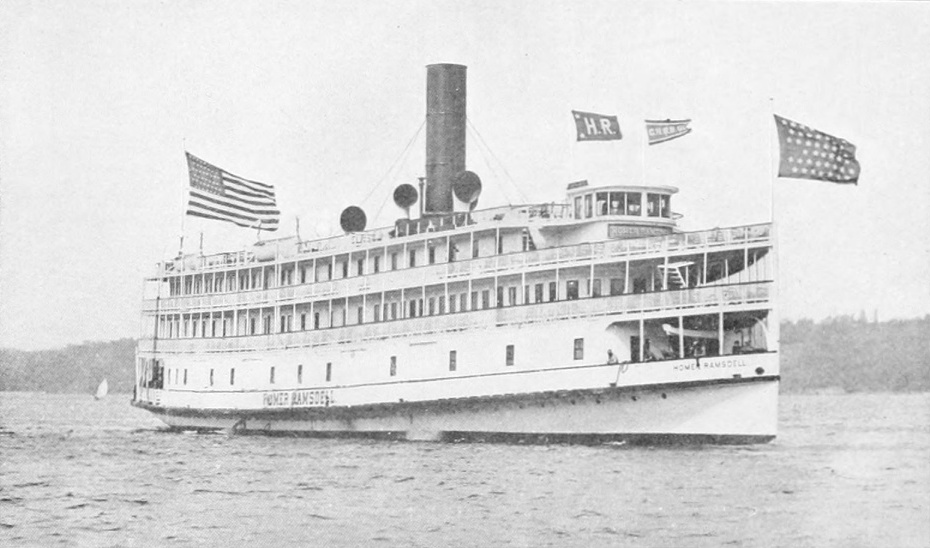
Steamboat Homer Ramsdell, built in 1887

Ramsdell was associated with the Erie Railroad, and in 1845 he was elected a member of the board of directors of that corporation. In 1853 he was chosen president of the company, in which position he promoted Daniel McCallum General superintendent. He resigned the office in July, 1857. He was intimately identified with the various local institutions of Newburgh and a prompt contributor to all progressive and elevating movements of his day. In 1887 the Hudson River steamboat Homer Ramsdell was named after him.

== Personal life ==
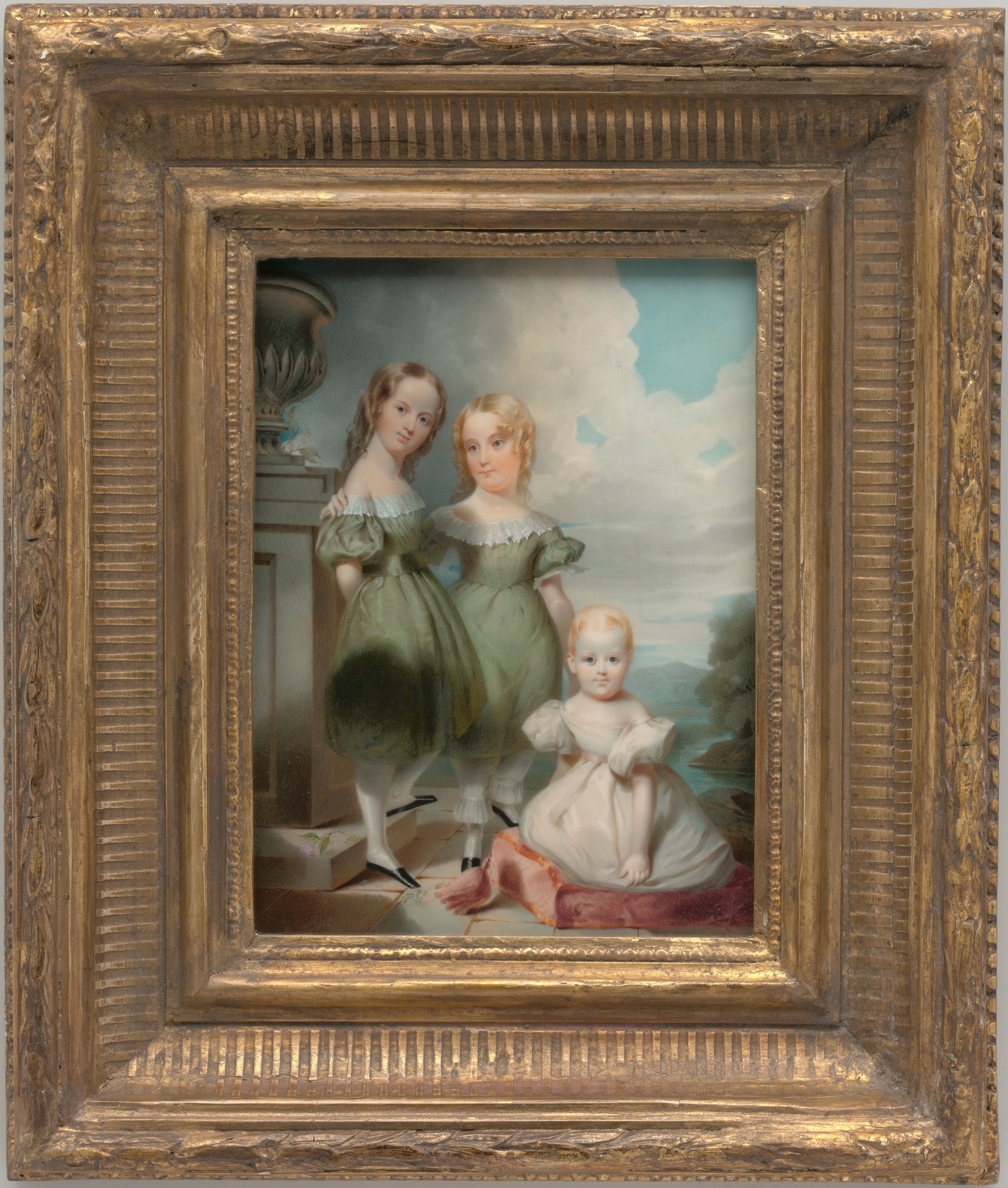
"The Children of Homer Ramsdell" by Thomas Seir Cummings (1842)

Homer and Frances Ramsdell had the following children:

- Mary Ludlow Powell (b. 1836)
- Frances Josephine Ramsdell (b. 1838), widow of Major George W. Rains;
- Thomas Powell (b. 1840–91)
- James A. P. Ramsdell
- H. Powell Ramsdell (b. 1844–1934)
- Homer Stockbridge Ramsdell (b. 1851–1930).
- Leila Rains Ramsdell (b. 1856)

== Selected publications ==
- "Report of the President of the New York and Erie Railroad to the Stockholders, for the Year Ending September 30" in: Annual Report. New York and Erie Railroad Company, 1856. p. 5-19

Business positions
| Preceded by Benjamin Loder | President of Erie Railroad; 1853–1857 | Succeeded by Charles Moran |
