= Benjamin Loder =

American businessman

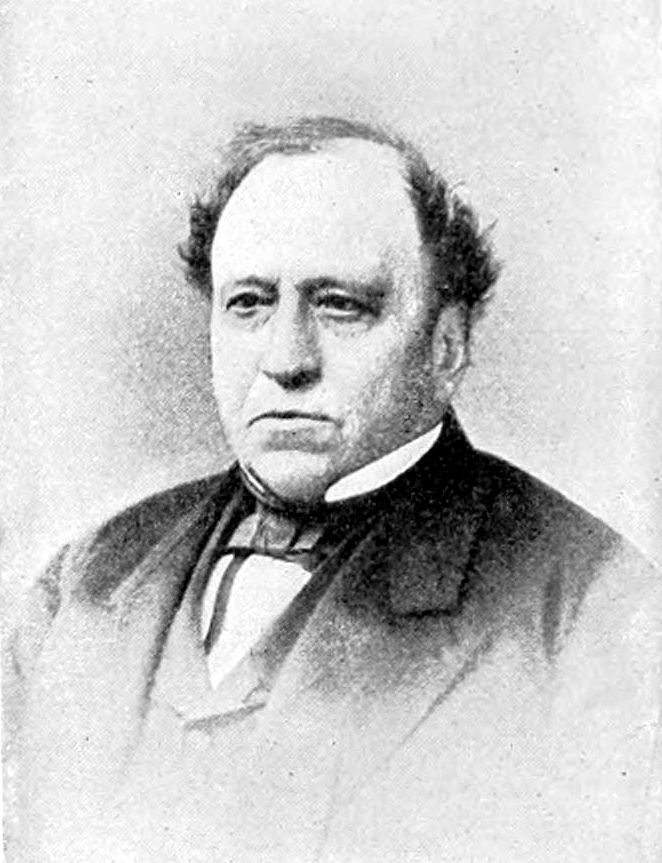
Benjamin Loder

Benjamin Loder (February 15, 1801 – October 7, 1876) was an American businessman and president of the Erie Railroad from 1845 to 1853, who had made his fortune in New York as dry goods merchant.

== Biography ==
Loder was born at South Salem, New York February 15, 1801. He began life as a school teacher, and later engaged in the wholesale dry-goods trade in Cedar Street, New York City.

Having accumulated a comfortable fortune, he had retired from active business life at the age of forty-three. The reputation he had made as a progressive and successful business man led the struggling New York and Erie Railroad Company, at a crisis in its affairs, to solicit him to take hold of them, and endeavor to save the company from ruin. He was elected president, August 14, 1845, succeeding Eleazar Lord, and remained at the head of the Company eight years.

Loder retired from the presidency broken in health. A friend, knowing of his large subscription to the stock of the company, asked him, soon after he had retired, if he lost his money. No, said he, I neither lost nor made any money while with the railroad. As a matter of fact, the money President Loder received for his services, which were given night and day, barely reimbursed him for his expenses. In course of time, Loder's health was restored to somewhat of its old vigor, and he spent the closing days his life in Westchester County, New York. He died at Rye, October 7, 1876, aged seventy-five years. He was a modest, able, generous, and honest man. He was survived by two sons and five daughters. The older of the two sons died in 1890.

== Work ==
=== Erie and New York Railroad ===
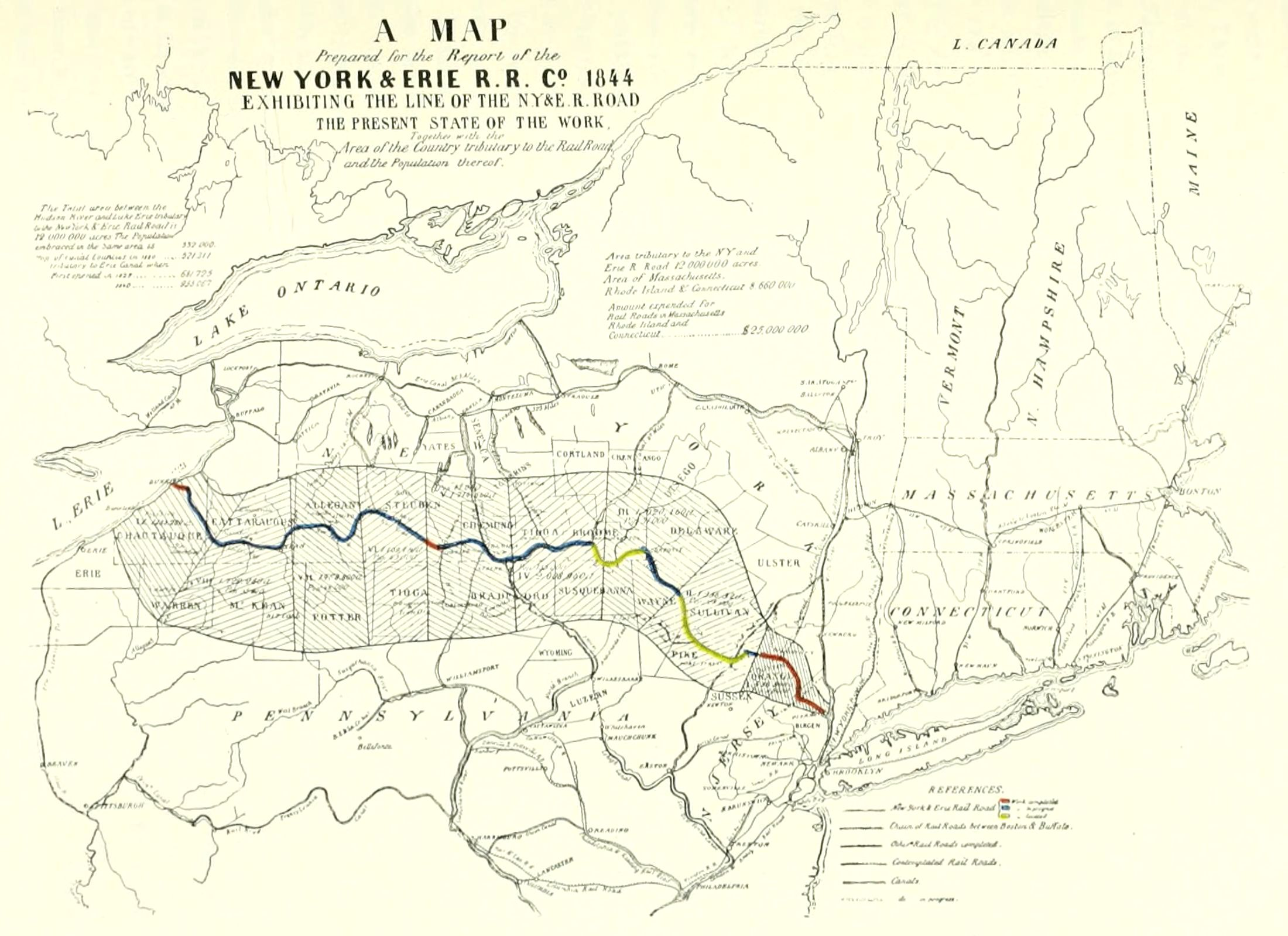
Map of New York & Erie Rail Road, 1844, showing the state of work.

Loder was a native of Westchester County, N.Y. He had been for twenty years in the dry goods trade in New York, and had accumulated a fortune. It was said of him that he had never asked for bank accommodation in all his business career. According to a New York newspaper of that day:

He now, while yet in the prime of life, comes into the direction of the Erie Road with all the shrewdness which characterized the architect of his own fortunes, and the observation gained from his own daily intercourse with all classes of men lead them to believe that he is the Hercules, aided by a most able Hoard, who will, if any man can, drain the present miry slough.

If all classes of men held that belief, events proved that they had held it wisely, for even the metaphor of his newspaper friend did not daunt him. The difficulties President Loder overcame during his struggle to complete the work he had engaged to complete were unprecedented in the history of the railroad, shirking as he did no exercise of physical endurance, shrinking from no encounter with physical hardships, nor leaving untried any effort of his mind that mind that might sustain and hasten to completion the task he had in hand.

=== Subscription for capital stock ===
Soon after Benjamin Loder was chosen president of Erie in 1845, he invited twenty-two of the richest men in New York City to meet him in conference at the New York Hotel. They met, and he at once declared to them that among them they must subscribe sufficient money to start up the work on the railroad and keep it going, a sum which he placed at $3,000,000. To set an example to the others, he himself subscribed $250,000, his entire fortune.

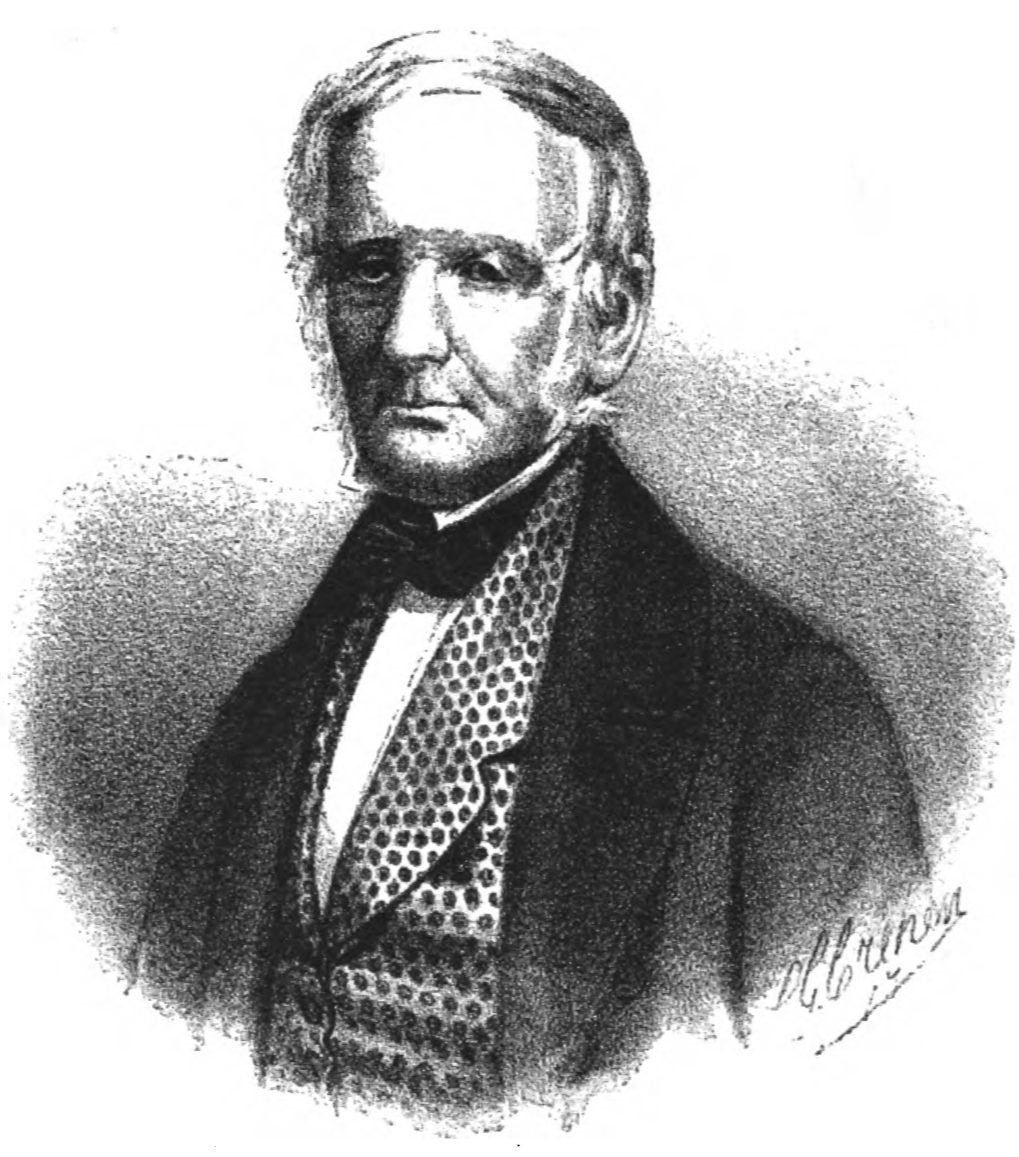
Stephen Whitney, present at the 1845 meeting.

Stephen Whitney, the millionaire cotton-merchant, was one of the men present at the meeting. He pulled at Mr. Loder's coat-tail to attract his attention, and admonished him not to risk his all in the enterprise. It will ruin you, the cautious cotton-merchant whispered in his ear. But President Loder shook his head, and refused to withdraw the subscription. Aroused by his confidence in the enterprise, the twenty-two men there and then subscribed the required amount.

President Loder's first act was to open books for subscriptions to §3,000,000 of the capital stock of the company, September 2, 1845, at the office of the company, 50 Wall Street. The plan of subscription was the payment of §5 per share as soon as required by the company after the entire amount had been subscribed, on condition that interest at six per cent, per annum be paid semi-annually on all the instalments from the date of the respective payments until a single track from the Hudson to Lake Erie and the branch to Newburgh should be completed and in use; no instalment to be called in until 30,000 shares at $100 each were subscribed and accepted, nor any instalment to be more than $25 per share within a year after the $3,000,000 had been subscribed, nor more than §30 per share the second, nor more than $45 the third year; every subscriber to the stock, after paying $25 per share, and purchasing any bond or bonds issued under the act of May 14, 1845, to be entitled to exchange such bonds into stock of the Company at par, to an amount equal to his subscription.

=== Address to the public ===
President Loder issued an address to the public to accompany the plan for raising the necessary money. In this he made these interesting statements, published among other places in an 1845 edition of the Railway Locomotives and Cars journal:

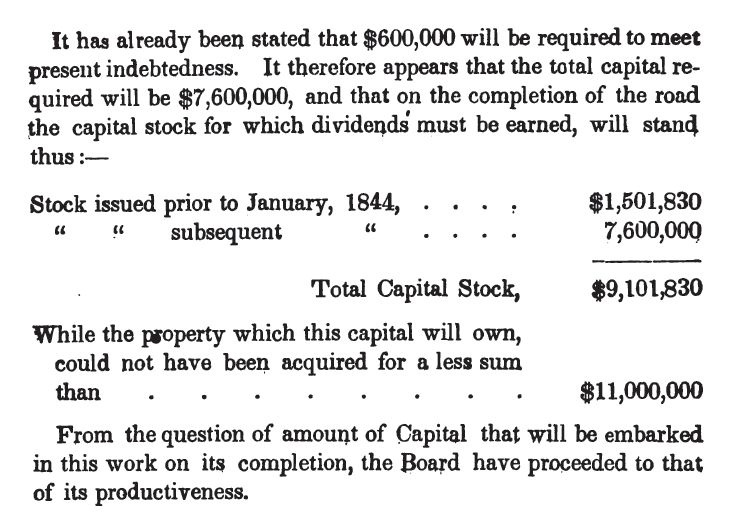
Financial conditions of Erie Railroad Company, 1844

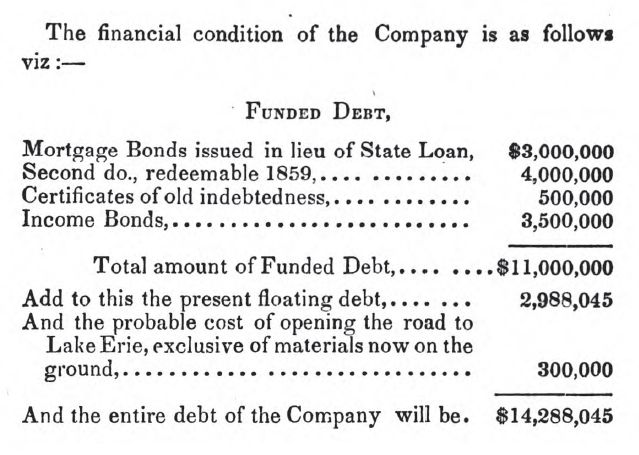
Financial conditions of Erie Railroad Company, 1851

To complete a single track to Lake Erie, six millions of dollars are required. The cost of the work to the stockholders will then be $7,350,000; and adding a liberal amount to provide for cars and engines for the commencement of business, the road, with a heavy (T) rail estimated at $65 per ton, will be brought into use for less than $20,000 per mile. The actual cost of the road will be over $28,000 per mile, but the liberality of the State, and the surrender of half of the stock by the present holders, reduces it to this very low rate.
In reference to the estimates, it may be proper to state, that responsible contractors have offered to take the whole work at prices nine per cent, less than those assumed in the calculations on which they were based. If the road can be completed it must pay large dividends. The results obtained in the sections already in use prove this. The great length of the work, the productiveness of the country through which it passes and to which it leads, the absence of all danger of injurious competition from rival routes, the numerous branches already existing or in contemplation, exceeding in the aggregate the length of the main trunk, the immense market which this city (New York) will afford for agricultural products of every description, and the boundless country whose inhabitants must be supplied with merchandise to be sent in exchange, appear to leave no reasonable doubt on this most important question. To these considerations must be added the great improvements in motive power which have recently been made, and which have demonstrated fully that railroads can, and do, compete successfully in the transportation of articles of heavy merchandise with any other mode of conveyance.
With regard to the indebtedness of the company, the amount of which is about $600,000, the board is happy to be able to state that, owing to the liberality manifested by the principal creditors, the time of payment for most of it has been extended, on satisfactory terms, the sum of $486,839.37, in the shape of six and seven per cent, certificates, payable on 1 January 1849. The holders of about one-half the remainder have agreed to settle by taking certificates of the same character, and the residue, including an amount due for work recently done on the Shawangunk summit, is in course of settlement, as the means of the company will permit.

Added to the other inducements are those of the release by the State of the $3,000,000 loan, and the reduction of the old stock from $1,500,000 to $750,000, making altogether a bonus of $3,750,000 to the new stockholders. Thus the whole work, on which about $5,000,000 has been expended, will be represented by stock and debts to the amount of only $1,350,000.

More precise, of the $3,000,000 required to be raised by subscription, more than one million of dollars have been pledged in large sums by a very few friends of the road, leaving less than two millions to be raised by additional subscriptions, to secure the full benefit of the recent act of the Legislature. For comparison, when the Erie came into existence a quarter of a century earlier, it had stated : " The whole work, on which about §5,000,000 has been expended, will be represented by stock and debts to the amount only of §1,350,000." In later days of Erie management this could well have been read thus: "The whole work, on which about §1,350,000 has been expended, will be represented by stocks and debts to the amount of §5,000,000."

A genuine inclination on the part of capital to take hold in earnest and push the New York and Erie Railroad to completion, now manifested itself. Individual members of the board of directors made committees of themselves to solicit subscriptions, and one of them, Director Sheldon, raised §100,000 among the grocers of New York in one day. By the beginning of October, 1845, the entire loan of §3,000,000 was subscribed, and Newburgh subscribed §100,000 toward the building of the Newburgh Branch.

Business positions
Preceded by Eleazar Lord	President of Erie Railroad; 1845–1853	Succeeded by Homer Ramsdell
