= Railroader of the Year =

Railroader of the Year is an annual award presented to a North American railroad industry worker by trade journal Railway Age. The award was first presented in 1964 by trade journal Modern Railroads and has continued through the magazine acquisition in 1992 to the present.

Past recipients of this award include:

- 1964 – D. William Brosnan (SOU)
- 1965 – Stuart T. Saunders (PRR)
- 1966 – Stuart T. Saunders (PRR)
- 1967 – Louis W. Menk (NP)
- 1968 – William B. Johnson (IC)
- 1969 – John W. Barriger III (Monon, P&LE, MKT)
- 1970 – John Shedd Reed (ATSF)
- 1971 – Jervis Langdon, Jr. (PC)
- 1972 – Charles Luna (United Transportation Union)
- 1973 – James W. Germany (SP)
- 1974 – L. Stanley Crane (SOU)
- 1975 – Frank E. Barnett (UP)
- 1976 – William J. Harris, Jr. (Association of American Railroads)
- 1977 – Edward G. Jordan (CR)
- 1978 – Robert M. Brown (UP)
- 1979 – Theodore C. Lutz (WMATA)
- 1980 – John G. German (MP)
- 1981 – Lawrence Cena (ATSF)
- 1982 – A. Paul Funkhouser (FL)
- 1983 – L. Stanley Crane (SOU, CR)
- 1984 – Hays T. Watkins (CSX)
- 1985 – John L. Cann (CN)
- 1986 – Raymond C. Burton, Jr. (Trailer Train Corporation)
- 1987 – Willis B. Kyle (Kyle Railways)
- 1988 – Darius W. Gaskins, Jr. (BN)
- 1989 – W. Graham Claytor, Jr. (Amtrak)
- 1990 – Arnold B. McKinnon (NS)
- 1991 – Mike Walsh (UP)
- 1992 – William H. Dempsey (Association of American Railroads)
- 1993 – Raymond C. Burton, Jr. (TTX Corporation)
- 1994 – L. S. “Jake” Jacobson (Copper Basin Railway)
- 1995 – Edward L. Moyers (SP)
- 1996 – Robert D. Krebs (ATSF) and Gerald Grinstein (BN)
- 1997 – Paul M. Tellier (CN)
- 1998 – David R. Goode (NS)
- 1999 – Edward Burkhardt (WC)
- 2000 – The Railroad Worker (the award for 2000 was changed to "Railroader of the Century")
- 2001 – Mike Haverty (ATSF, KCS)
- 2002 – E. Hunter Harrison (BN, IC, CN)
- 2003 – Richard K. Davidson (UP)
- 2004 – Robert J. Ritchie (CP)
- 2005 – David R. Goode (NS)
- 2006 – Richard F. Timmons (American Short Line and Regional Railroad Association)
- 2007 – Bill Wimmer (UP)
- 2008 – Steve Tobias (NS)
- 2009 – Michael J. Ward (CSX)
- 2010 – Matthew K. Rose (BNSF)
- 2011 – Wick Moorman (NS)
- 2012 – David L. Starling (KCS)
- 2013 – James R. Young (UP)
- 2014 – Joseph H. Boardman (Amtrak)
- 2015 – E. Hunter Harrison (CP)
- 2016 – Carl Ice (BNSF)
- 2017 – Tom Prendergast (MTA)
- 2018 – John C. “Jack” Hellmann (G&W)
- 2019 – Jean-Jacques “JJ” Ruest (CN)
- 2020 – Patrick J. Ottensmeyer (KCS)
- 2021 – Keith Creel (CP)
- 2022 – Keith Creel (CP) and Patrick J. Ottensmeyer (KCS)
