= 2005 in rail transport =

This article lists events related to rail transport that occurred in 2005.

== Events ==
=== January events ===
- January 1 – The Korean National Railroad in South Korea is split into the Korea Railroad Corporation, branded as Korail, which will operate trains, and Korea Rail Network Authority (KR), which maintains the tracks.
- (Switzerland) January 5 – The metre-gauge Brünig railway line of the Swiss Federal Railways and the Luzern–Stans–Engelberg railway line merge to form the Zentralbahn.
- (United States) January 12 – General Motors announces that it has agreed to sell Electro-Motive Diesel to a consortium led by Greenbriar Equity Group and Berkshire Partners.
- January 29 – Singapore's third LRT Line, Punggol LRT Line, is opened.

=== February events ===
- (Canada) February 25 – Bombardier is awarded a contract to build 361 passenger cars for a new Chinese rail line to Lhasa, Tibet; due to the destination's altitude the cars will include special UV-filtering glass and a unique oxygen enriching system.
- (Spain) February 26 – AVE Class 102 trains enter regular operation on the Madrid-Zaragoza-Lleida line.

=== March events ===
- (United States) March 2 – Citing disputes in paid leave policies, around 200 BNSF dispatchers walk off the job for nearly three hours, causing traffic delays over the entire system from Chicago to the Pacific coast.
- (Canada) March 14 – Canadian Pacific purchases 35 new Green Goat hybrid locomotives, becoming the first railroad to order this type of locomotive.

=== April events ===
- April 1
  - (Canada) – All former BC Rail systems and operations are fully integrated into those of the purchasing railroad, Canadian National.
  - (Mexico) – Kansas City Southern Railway completes its controlling interest purchase of TFM; Vicente Corta is named interim CEO of TFM.
- (United Kingdom) April 7 – Railways Act 2005 (UK) provides for abolition of Strategic Rail Authority.
- April 13 – The transport ministry of Bulgaria issues the first freight transport license to a private company, Bulgarian Railway Company, to operate on the nation's rail network.
- (Switzerland) April 28 – Swiss engineers blast through the last section of rock on the first bore of the Lötschberg Base Tunnel project under the Alps. See also Swiss finish drilling world's longest overland tunnel

=== May events ===
- May 3 – The Iranian president Mohammad Khatami leads the ceremony inaugurating passenger rail service between Mashhad and Bafq, Iran.
- May 26 – Genesee & Wyoming (G&W) announce that they have agreed to purchase the railroad operations of Rail Management Corporation (RMC). G&W will pay US$243 million in cash and assume $1.7 million in company debt to gain control of 14 short line railroads from RMC across the southeastern United States, as of June 1, 2005. G&W already controls 24 other railroads in North America, South America and Australia.
- (United States) May 27 – The 9 of the New York City Subway makes its last ride.

=== June events ===
- June 1 – Joseph H. Boardman, former Commissioner of New York State Department of Transportation, begins his duties as Administrator for the United States Federal Railroad Administration (a division of the United States Department of Transportation).
- June 2 – Railroad workers across France go on strike to demand better wages and jobs. The strike, which began at 18:00 GMT on Wednesday, is expected to last through 6:00 GMT Friday. Nearly 40% of all TGV schedules are dropped for the duration of the strike.
- June 4 – Lalu Prasad, India's Railway Minister, presents his Rs.532 billion (US$12 billion) budget for Indian Railways for 2005–06. The network of more than 9,000 passenger trains will not increase passenger fares, will add 46 new trains, increase frequencies on 10 others and plans to inaugurate new high speed train service between New Delhi and Kolkata and another between New Delhi and Chennai.
- June 22 – The entire network of the Swiss Federal Railways shuts down due to a power failure in its overhead wire system. The power failure is also affecting international transit through Switzerland as such intercity trains use the same system. Initial reports indicate that the power failure started with a voltage drop in Ticino (in the St. Gotthard region) that then spread to the entire system.

=== July events ===
- (India) July 1 – Indian Railways is expected to inaugurate two new Shatabdi Express passenger trains, one between Chennai and Bangalore and a new Jan-Shatabdi Express between Madgaon and Mangalore.
- (Republic of Ireland) July 29 – Iarnród Éireann, the Irish state railway operator, ceases all container freight traffic on the network. Freight yards at Limerick and Dublin will be closed.

=== August events ===
- (Argentina) August 4 – Argentinian railroad workers across the country (except for the subway operators in Buenos Aires) go on strike for 24 hours demanding higher wages. The strike comes after 100 days of failed negotiations between the railroads and the engine driver unions; if an agreement cannot be reached within a week, the unions have threatened a subsequent 36-hour strike. The railroad employees strike coincides with a 72-hour health care workers strike that is still occurring.
- (Australia) August 7 – The Thornlie line opens as a spur off Transperth's Armadale line to Thornlie station.
- August 15 – All America Latina Logistica (ALL) of Brazil announces that it has formed a partnership with Besco Engineering and Services Private Limited of India to build new railroad cars in Brazil. The new enterprise, to be named Santa Fe Vagoes SA, will be located in Brazil and 40% owned by ALL.
- (China) August 24 – Chinese railroad workers in Tibet laid rails on the Tanggula Mountain Pass in Tibet at 5,072 m (16,640 ft) above sea level, surpassing the altitude of the highest Peruvian railway by 255 m (837 ft). This section of the Qinghai-Tibet Railway is now the highest railway in the world. The railway also includes the highest railway station in the world at Lhasa, 5,068 m (16,627 ft) above sea level. The railway is expected to open later in 2005.
- (Norway) August 27 – The first section of the Asker Line, from Asker to Sandvika, is opened.

=== September events ===
- (United States) September 2 – In a letter to the governors of Louisiana, Mississippi and Alabama, BNSF (headquartered in Fort Worth, Texas) pledges a contribution of US$1 million, and offers rail transportation to aid in relief efforts for the areas affected by Hurricane Katrina. The monetary contribution would come from the Burlington Northern Santa Fe Foundation as a donation to the American Red Cross relief efforts, while the transportation assistance is currently being organized by the Association of American Railroads, Federal Emergency Management Agency, Federal Railroad Administration and the other railroads that serve the area. The letter also states that repairs to the Bayou Boeuf bridge are now complete and BNSF's mainline was reopened as originally planned at 6:00 PM Central Time on September 1.
- (United States) September 4 – The Girard Avenue Trolley in Philadelphia recommences service after thirteen years of bus substitution.
- September 6 – Indonesian transport officials at a meeting in Bandar Lampung announce plans to build a trans-Sumatran railway to connect Banda Aceh to Bakauheni, a distance of 2,151 km (1,337 mi). A Feasibility Study performed after the 2004 tsunami by SNCF, the national rail carrier of France, showed that such a line could be built. Construction is expected to commence in seven stages; the first stage would connect Banda Aceh to Besitang (484 km / 301 miles). (Indonesia Relief)
- September 13 – The Nigerian Railway Corporation (NRC), the national rail carrier of Nigeria, announces that it has laid off 5,980 of its nearly 12,000 employees, answering a call from the Nigerian government to downsize. The government first asked NRC for a 50% reduction in the last quarter of 2003; NRC waited until there was sufficient funds from the government for severance packages for the affected employees. In all, the government released nearly N2.1 billion (US$16 million) to NRC for severance pay. Some of NRC's layoff criteria included fraud, excessive absenteeism, employees who had worked for more than 33 years, or who were aged 50–60, and employees with a history of disciplinary actions. (AllAfrica)
- (Japan) September 20 – Japanese officials announce the government's intentions to pay former World War II prisoners of war involved in the construction of the Death Railway between Thailand and Burma. Compensation amounts have not been announced; some estimates place the number of construction survivors at 1,800, most now aged in their 80s and 90s. The compensation for laborers who have died either during construction or afterward would be sent to their next of kin.
- (Netherlands) September 29 – Sixty years after World War II, Nederlandse Spoorwegen issues a statement formally apologizing for transporting Jewish people to Nazi concentration camps in Germany and Poland during the war. Aad Veenman, the railway's chief executive stated "On behalf of the company and from the bottom of my heart, I sincerely apologise for what happened during the war." The railway made the decision to issue the formal apology after the largest Dutch Jewish organization, Centraal Joods Overleg, proposed an awareness campaign to take place at the railway's stations nationwide. Reaction among the survivors is mixed.

=== October events ===
- (United States) October 6 – Amtrak announces that the City of New Orleans and Crescent passenger trains will again serve New Orleans Union Station beginning on Sunday October 9. Before Hurricane Katrina made landfall, Amtrak suspended City of New Orleans service south of Memphis, Tennessee, and suspended Crescent service south of Atlanta, Georgia, in anticipation of damage to the tracks and signal systems surrounding New Orleans. The first departure from New Orleans will be the northbound Crescent at 7:20 AM, followed by the northbound City of New Orleans at 1:45 PM; the first corresponding southbound trains are scheduled to arrive in New Orleans later that afternoon. Amtrak's announcement did not mention service restoration on the transcontinental Sunset Limited.
- October 14 – The concession for operation of the Kenya-Uganda Railways is awarded to Rift Valley Railways Consortium (RVRC), headquartered in South Africa. In announcing the bid, officials state that Rift Valley was selected over RITES Ltd. of India, the only other bidder, by a factor of two to one. The new operator is expected to begin management of the combined railway on March 30, 2006. RVRC will not be expected to take up the railways KSh.20.9 billion/= (US$282 million) debt, but will repay the Kenyan government KSh.3 billion/= ($40.5 million) that was spent to subsidize the railway for the last three years.
- (China) October 15 – Chinese officials announce the completion of the Qingzang railway connecting Xining, Qinghai Province, to Lhasa, Tibet Autonomous Region. The line's construction, which has been criticized by some who say the new railway will dilute Tibetan culture, had to overcome technical challenges that included building a railway on top of permafrost and boring tunnels through solid ice while construction workers breathed bottled oxygen.
- (United Kingdom) October 17 – British railway ministers announce that Scottish Ministers will soon take control of railway administration within Scotland. The powers will include decisions over operations and infrastructure (such as tracks and stations) as well as oversight of the First ScotRail franchise. The British government will also supply a multi-million pound grant to fund the Scottish rail operations, money that is needed in order to move the Edinburgh station improvement project forward, for example. British ministers will retain train driver licensing as well as other safety obligations.
- (Sweden) October 24 – World's first biogas train makes maiden voyage.
- October 31 – Rapid transit workers in Philadelphia, Pennsylvania, go on strike. SEPTA, the fifth largest transit agency in the United States, is forced to temporarily close several lines due to a lack of trained employees. Union negotiators walked out of contract negotiations minutes before the midnight deadline when they failed to come to a conclusion; disputes were centered around employee pay and benefits agreements. All operators on the City, Victory, and Frontier Divisions walked off the job. SEPTA services on the regional rail division continue according to contingency plans, and all bus, trolley, and subway lines are suspended until the conclusion of the work stoppage.

=== November events ===
- November 1 – Government officials in China announce plans to privatise the nation's rail network into separate corporations that could be listed on international stock markets. The strategy is to raise money for improvements and expansions to the network, which would increase the amount of track by about 27,000 km (17,000 mi). The plan could lead to partial or complete foreign ownership of some railway lines, but some investors have already raised concerns over the network's regulatory system, especially in regard to the newly independent railways' abilities to raise prices to cover costs. (BBC News)
- November 4 – The United States Federal Railroad Administration (FRA) announces a requirement for increased and more detailed inspections of around 90,000 miles (140,000 km) of track that use continuous welded rail. The inspections are to detect and repair potential problems that involve loose or missing bolts, detectable problems in the rail and other potential hazards. In making the announcement, the FRA and National Transportation Safety Board cite inadequate track inspections as the cause of three major derailments since 2002, including a Canadian Pacific (CP) derailment in January 2002 near Minot, North Dakota, that released a cloud of anhydrous ammonia, and an Amtrak derailment in 2004 near Flora, Mississippi, in which a passenger died. CP disputes inadequate inspections as the cause of the 2002 accident. (AP/Newsday) (FRA)
- November 23 – Railroad workers across France return to work from a strike action. The labour unions involved in the strike report that they are pleased with concessions agreed to during negotiations on Tuesday and French President Jacques Chirac offered his personal guarantee that SNCF would not be privatised. The strike, the sixth by French rail workers in 2005, suspended one third of all TGV trains across the country. (IHT)

=== December events ===
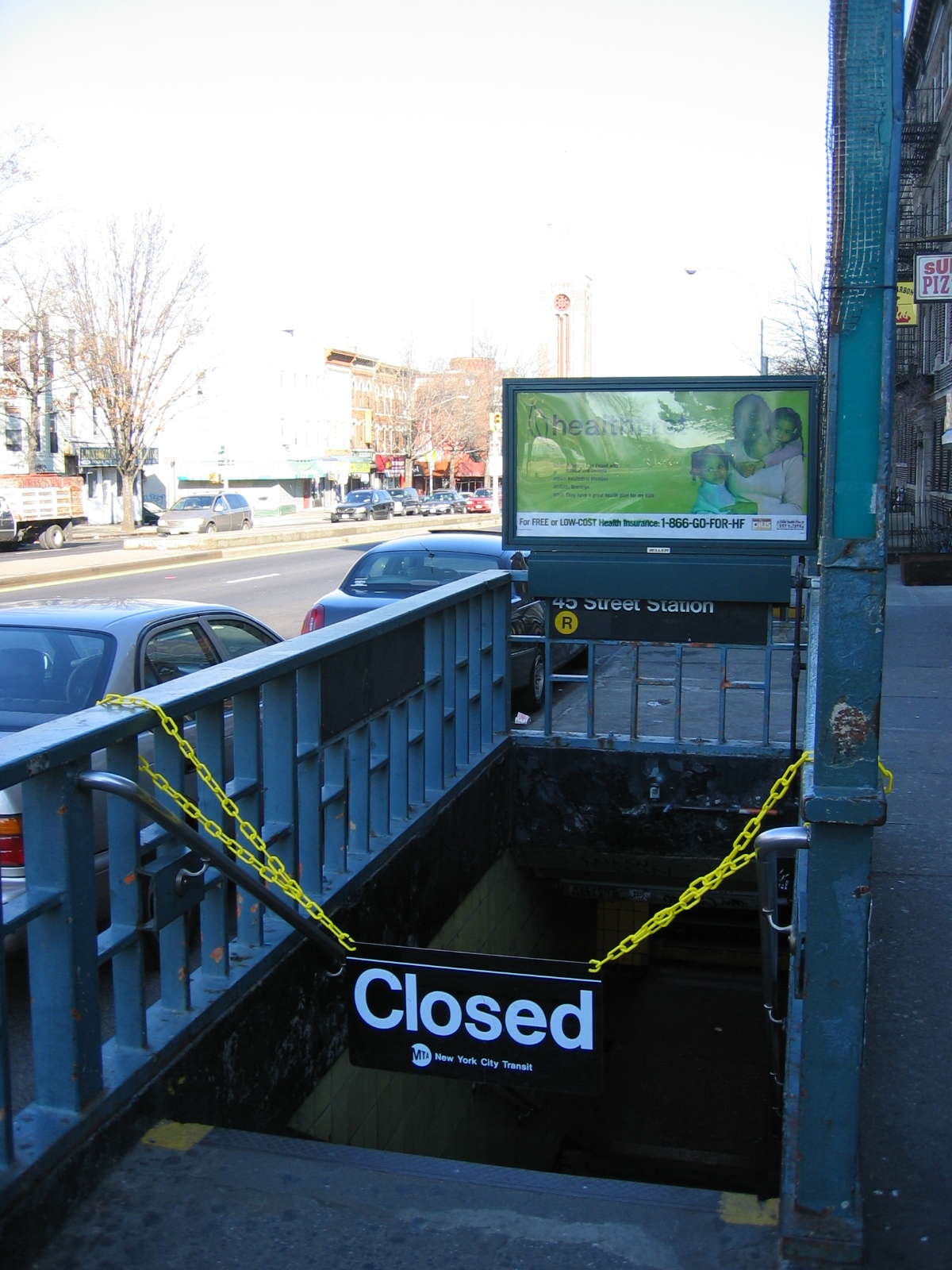
The 45th Street R station closed during the 2005 New York City transit strike

- (United States) (Canada) December 2 – Schnabel car CEBX 800, the largest such car on North American rails, departs Duluth, Minnesota, in a special Canadian Pacific train bound for Long Lake in northern Alberta. The car is carrying what has been called the largest single-car freight load ever carried in North America, an enormous "hydro cracker" reactor built in pieces in Dubai and Japan. The 1.5 million pound load was offloaded from the ship Stellaprima in Duluth on November 23.
- December 6
  - – General Sheikh Mohammed bin Zayed Al Nahyan, Crown Prince of Abu Dhabi, announces that studies will begin on connecting all of the emirates in the United Arab Emirates by rail for both passenger and intermodal freight transport. The 700 km (430 mi) proposed route would connect Abu Dhabi, Dubai, Sharjah, Ras Al Khaimah and Fujairah with Ruwais and Ghowaifat. Officials hope to create a public-private partnership in order to build and operate the proposed railway. The project is part of a wider plan and a requirement of the Gulf Cooperation Council's plan to connect all Arab states by rail.
  - (United Kingdom) – Opening of London's Docklands Light Railway extension to King George V, via London City Airport, England.
- December 7 – QJ 7081 pulls the world's last regularly scheduled passenger train behind a steam locomotive on a mainline railroad when it pulls a train between Daban and Chabuga, China.
- December 11 – In Switzerland, all trains become officially non-smoking
- (United Kingdom) December 12 – The Larkhall branch of the Argyle Line is re-opened. Opening Chatelherault railway station and re-opening Merryton railway station and Larkhall railway station.
- (United States) December 20 – New York City Subway workers walk off their jobs in a strike called by the Transport Workers Union at 3:00 AM local time. It is a move that may be in violation of a previous court ruling that makes subway worker strikes illegal, and MTA lawyers have asked the courts to review the strike action as one that may be in contempt of court with that ruling. Fines for such a ruling of contempt could include two days pay for each striking employee per day that the strike continues. The union claims that MTA should be able to afford the health care benefit and pension levels sought by the union due to a budget surplus of nearly US$1 billion. While the strike is in progress, the city of New York has implemented emergency statutes that include restricting private vehicles carrying less than four occupants from entering the city between 5:00 AM and 11:00 AM local time.
- (China) December 26 – The first section of Guangzhou Metro Line 4 opens connecting Wanshengwei to Xinzao.

== Accidents and attacks ==
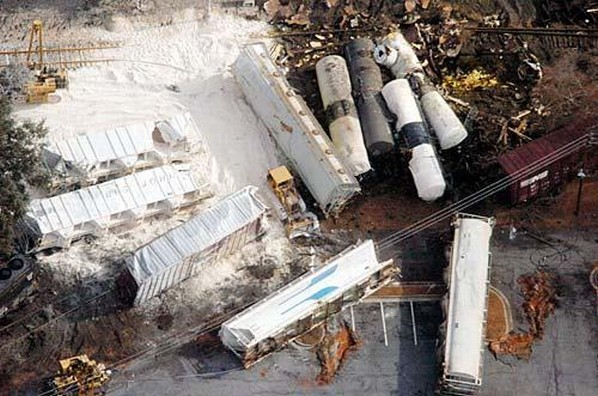
Aerial view of the Graniteville accident's aftermath.

- (United States) January 6 – Graniteville train disaster – A Norfolk Southern Railway train carrying a few carloads of hazardous materials (including chlorine gas) collides with a parked train in Graniteville, South Carolina, causing the deaths of 9 people and the injury of over 250 more.
- (Thailand) January 17 – Two MRT trains collide, injuring nearly 200 people.
- (United States) January 26 – Glendale train crash: In what police call a suicide attempt, a Metrolink train in Glendale, California (a suburb of Los Angeles), hits a car parked on a level crossing and then derails into another Metrolink train and a parked Union Pacific Railroad locomotive resulting in 11 fatalities and 200 injuries.
- (India) February 3 – Nagpur level crossing disaster kills 55 people.

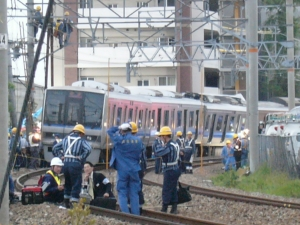
Investigation at the scene of the Amagasaki rail crash.

- April 25 – Amagasaki rail crash – A JR West commuter train derails and strikes an apartment building in Amagasaki, Hyogo, Japan, killing 106 and injuring more than 460 others.Japanese commuter train derails, apartment building smashed.
- June 12 – At 7:10 AM local time, a bomb explodes between Uzunovo and Bogatishchevo, Russia (about 95 miles / 153 km from Moscow), derailing the locomotive and first four passenger cars of the Grozny-Moscow train. Investigators found wires leading from the explosion site to a control panel and hideout about 164 ft (50 m) from the site.
- (Israel) June 21 – A southbound passenger train collides with a coal delivery truck near Revadim, about 25 miles south of Tel Aviv; the train was bound for Beersheba when the accident occurred. At least seven people die in the accident and more than 200 are injured.

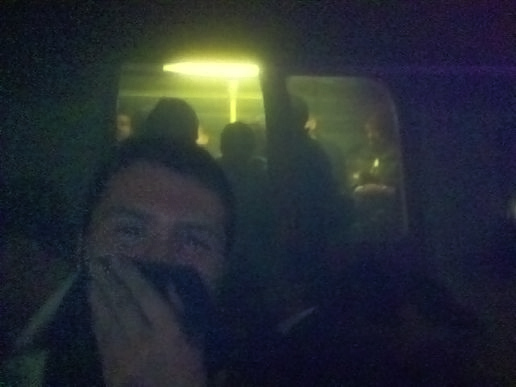
Smoke and confusion in the London Underground after the bomb blast.

- (United Kingdom) July 7 – Three bombs explode in the London Underground killing at least 35 people. Explosions occur between the Aldgate East and Liverpool Street stations, between King's Cross St Pancras and Russell Square, and at Edgware Road. A further bomb on a bus in Tavistock Square kills 13 people. A statement claiming responsibility is posted to a website known to be operated by associates of Al Qaeda.
- July 13 – Ghotki rail crash: A passenger train stopped at the railway station at Sarhad, Sindh, near Ghotki in Pakistan, is hit from behind by a train that has missed a signal. The derailed cars are subsequently hit by a third train, resulting in a total of seventeen wrecked train cars, which were carrying over 3,000 passengers. Between 109 and 133 people are killed and many injured. Pakistani railroad officials have called this the worst railroad accident there in 15 years.
- (India) October 29 – Veligonda rail disaster near the town of Veligonda, south of Hyderabad in the Indian State of Andhra Pradesh. A flash flood sweeps away a small rail bridge and a "Delta Express" train travelling on it derails at the broken section of the line, killing at least 114 people and injuring over 200.
- (Democratic Republic of the Congo) November 29 – In the Kindu rail accident at least 60 people are killed when they are swept off the roof of a train into the river below as the train crosses a bridge in eastern Democratic Republic of Congo.

== Deaths ==
=== January deaths ===
- (United States) January 23 – John H. Kuehl, editor of Private Varnish magazine, passenger car historian and photographer (b. 1938).

=== February deaths ===
- (United States) February 12 – Vernon L. Smith, mechanical engineer for Lima Locomotive Works in the 1930s, superintendent of motive power for the Belt Railway of Chicago in the 1970s, and noted railroad author (b. 1912).

=== March deaths ===
- (United States) March 28 – Paul H. Stringham, central Illinois railroad photographer and historian (b. 1913).

=== April deaths ===
- (United States) April 22 – Margaret Landry Moore, "Miss Southern Belle" spokesmodel for Kansas City Southern's Southern Belle passenger trains (b. 1923).
- (United States) April 28 – Frank Turpin, CEO of Alaska Railroad, 1985–1993 (b. 1923).

=== May deaths ===
- (United States) May 28 – Benjamin F. Biaggini, chairman and CEO of the Southern Pacific Company (parent company of Southern Pacific Railroad) 1964–1983 (b. 1916).

=== August deaths ===
- (United States) August 12 – E. Spencer Miller, president of Maine Central Railroad 1952–1978.

=== November deaths ===
- (United States) November 22 – Orville R. Harrold, president of Providence and Worcester Railroad 1980–2005 (b. 1932). (Railway Age)
- (United States) November 24 – Robert J. Kmieciak, chairman of the United Transportation Union Board of Appeals (b. 1923).

== Industry awards ==
=== Japan ===
Awards presented by Japan Railfan Club

- 2005 Blue Ribbon Award: JR Freight M250 series Super Rail Cargo EMU
- 2005 Laurel Prizes:
  - JR Kyushu 800 Series Shinkansen
  - Nagasaki Electric Tramway 3000 series tramcar

=== North America ===
2005 E. H. Harriman Awards

Group	Gold medal	Silver medal	Bronze medal
A	Norfolk Southern Railway	BNSF	CSX Transportation
B	Canadian Pacific's U.S. subsidiary (formerly Soo Line Railroad)	Kansas City Southern Railway	Metra
C	Florida East Coast Railway	Pan Am Railways	Elgin, Joliet and Eastern Railroad
S&T	Terminal Railroad Association of St. Louis	Conrail	Belt Railway of Chicago

Awards presented by Railway Age magazine

- 2005 Railroader of the Year: David R. Goode (Norfolk Southern)
- 2005 Regional Railroad of the Year: Red River Valley & Western Railroad
- 2005 Short Line Railroad of the Year: Cedar Rapids & Iowa City Railway

=== United Kingdom ===
Train Operator of the Year

- 2005: London Underground
