= 1995 in rail transport =

This article lists events related to rail transport that occurred in 1995.

== Events ==
=== January events ===
- January - David L. Gunn becomes commissioner of the Toronto Transit Commission.
- January - Burlington Northern Railroad tests new Trough Train articulated coal hopper cars.

=== February events ===
- February 1 - The last Algoma Central Railway train arrives at Steelton Yard in Sault Ste. Marie, Ontario, Canada, at 1:45 AM local time; Wisconsin Central takes ownership of the railway effective with the next train out of the yard at 2:45 AM.
- February 3 - Canadian National Railway sells the former Central Vermont Railway lines in New York and Vermont to RailTex, forming the basis for the New England Central Railroad.
- February 7 - Robert Krebs announces that Atchison, Topeka and Santa Fe Railway stockholders overwhelmingly approve the merger of the Santa Fe with the Burlington Northern Railroad.
- February 8 – Southern Pacific Transportation Company announces that Edward L. Moyers, then chairman of the Southern Pacific Company's board of directors, has submitted his resignation citing the advice of his physicians.
- February 22 - Southern Pacific Railroad (SP) announces the appointment of former CSX Transportation Chief Operating Officer Jerry Davis to the position of CEO for SP.

=== March events ===
- March 1 - CP Rail announces that Robert J. Ritchie will succeed I. Barry Scott as president and CEO of CP Rail.
- March 10 - Union Pacific Railroad announces its intent to purchase the Chicago and North Western Railway.
- March 15 - Fremont-Centerville (Amtrak station) is moved.
- March 20 - Sarin gas attack on the Tokyo subway perpetrated by members of the sect Aum Shinrikyo, killing 12 and injuring more than a thousand.
- March 27 - After a two-week strike by the Brotherhood of Maintenance of Way Employees and the Canadian Auto Workers affecting Canadian National Railway, Canadian Pacific Railway and Via Rail, the Canadian Parliament steps in and sets up arbitration panels to resolve the disputes.

=== April events ===
- April 12 - The Chicago and North Western Railway is merged into the Union Pacific Railroad.

=== May events ===
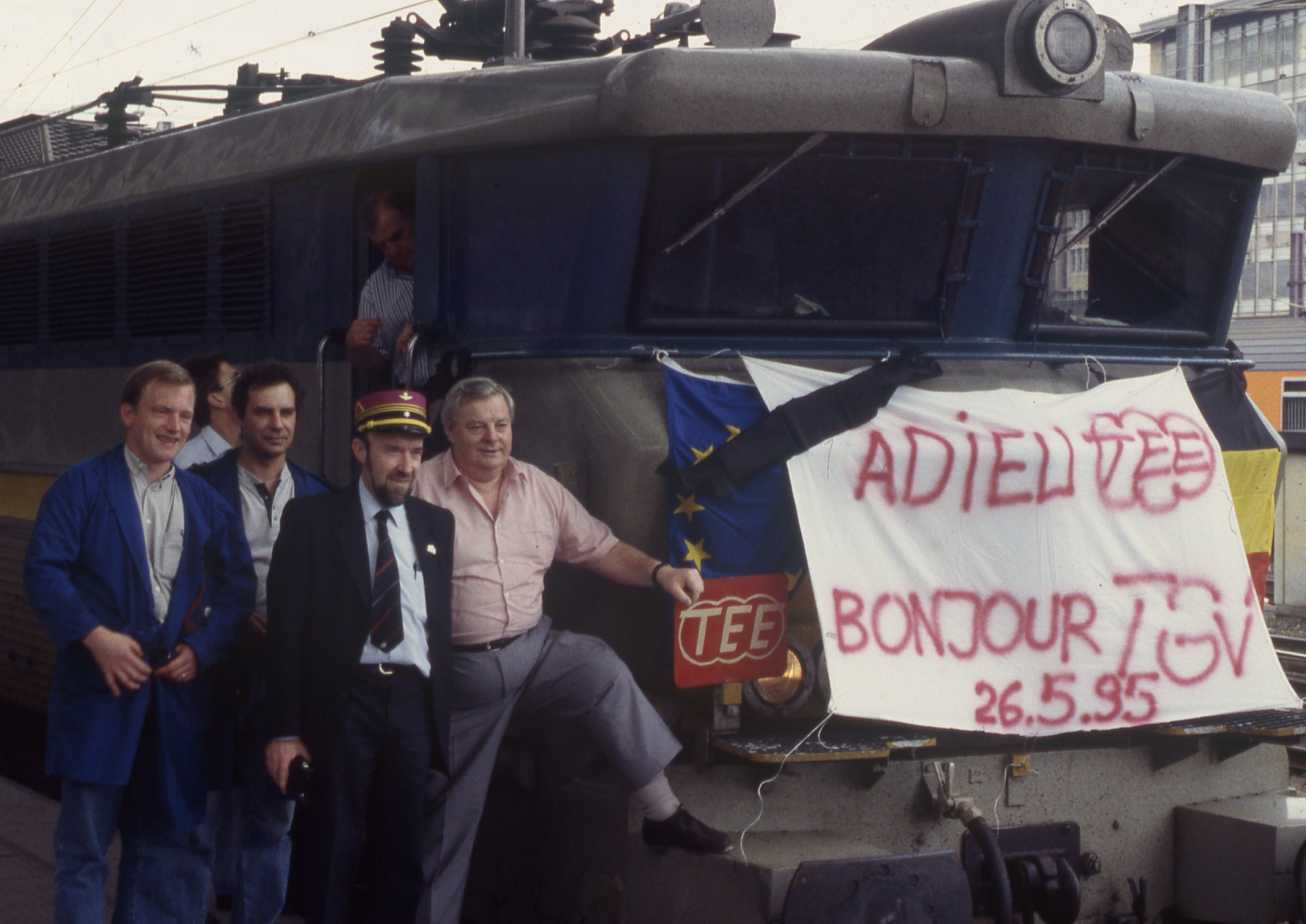
The last Trans-Europ Express at Brussels-South railway station

- May 28 - The last remaining Trans-Europ Express trains operate for the last time on this date.

=== June events ===
- June 5 - 1995 Williamsburg Bridge collision on the New York City Subway.

=== July events ===
- July 3 - The extension of Minsk Metro's Avtozavodskaya Line connecting Frunzenskaya to Pushkinskaya opens.
- July 18 - Indian Railways orders its first WDG-2 locomotive.
- July 25 - Paris Metro bombing kills eight.

=== August events ===
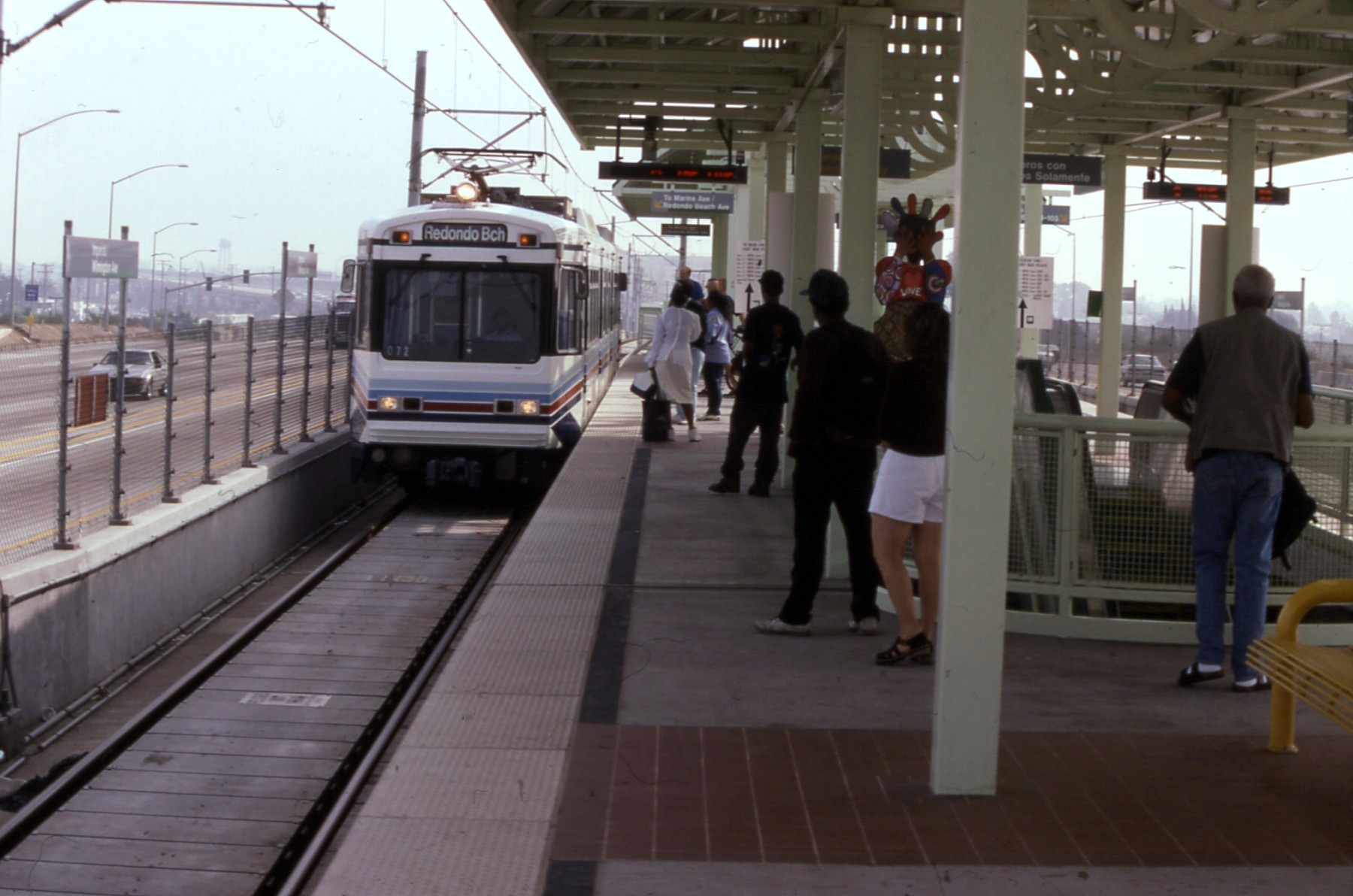
The Los Angeles County Metropolitan Transportation Authority Green Line at Imperial/Wilmington Ave station — the line primarily runs in a highway median strip, October 1995

- August 12 – The Los Angeles County Metropolitan Transportation Authority Green Line opens.
- August 14 – Malaysia's first electric commuter train service, the KTM Komuter, begins with 18 EMUs from Jenbacher Transport serving the Kuala Lumpur–Rawang sector.

=== September events ===
- September 1 - The F Market heritage streetcar line in San Francisco opens, using restored PCC streetcars.
- September 10 - Amtrak's City of New Orleans passenger train is permanently rerouted between Memphis and Jackson due to the Illinois Central Railroad's desire to abandon the original route (the Grenada District) in favor of the newer and flatter Yazoo District.
- September 22 - The holding companies of the Burlington Northern Railroad and Atchison, Topeka and Santa Fe Railway, Burlington Northern, Inc. and Santa Fe Pacific Corp., merge.

=== October events ===
- October 9 - An Amtrak Sunset Limited derails at a trestle near Palo Verde, Arizona by act of sabotage, killing one and injuring 78.
- October 26 - Canadian National Railway reopens commuter service between Montreal's Gare Centrale and Deux-Montagnes using new electric multiple unit rolling stock.

=== November events ===
- November 1 - Telecom Center Station in Kōtō, Tokyo Prefecture, Japan, opens.
- November 11 - The first line of Bilbao Metro in Bilbao (Basque Country, Spain) opens.
- November 15 - In Seoul, South Korea, the first section of Seoul Metropolitan Subway Line 5 opens between Wangsimni and Sangil-dong (14.5 km (9.0 mi)).
- November 28 - Canadian National Railway is privatized from the Canadian government.

=== December events ===
- December 6 - Indian Railways withdraws its last broad gauge steam locomotives, from Jalandhar–Ferozepur service.
- December 9 - British mail and parcels carrier Rail Express Systems is acquired by North & South Railways, an affiliate of Wisconsin Central Ltd, as part of the privatisation of British Rail, the first operating company to be sold.
- December 16 - Bay Area Rapid Transit opens an extension to North Concord/Martinez station, the first such expansion of service past the original system built in the 1970s.
- December 28 - Lyublinsko-Dmitrovskaya line is opened.
- December 31 - The Interstate Commerce Commission in the United States is dissolved effective today; many of the railroad duties performed by the ICC are transferred to the newly formed Surface Transportation Board.

=== Unknown date events ===
- Canadian National Railway opens the tunnel under the St. Clair River, connecting Sarnia, Ontario, and Port Huron, Michigan.
- China Railway opens the Jitong or Jining–Tongliao railway (945 km (587 mi)) in Inner Mongolia. For its first decade, it will be operated entirely by steam locomotives (chiefly QJ class) and with semaphore signals.

== Accidents ==
- August 11 - The Russell Hill subway accident, the first fatal accident on Toronto's subway system under the auspices of the Toronto Transit Commission, kills 3.
- August 20 - Firozabad rail disaster in India kills 358.
- October 25 - The Fox River Grove level crossing accident, in Fox River Grove, Illinois in the United States involves a school bus and a Metra train killing seven of the students aboard the bus and injuring 21 others.
- October 28 - The Baku Metro fire in Azerbaijan's capital, Baku, kills 289 and injures 265, the world's deadliest subway disaster.

== Industry awards ==
=== North America ===
==== Awards presented by Railway Age magazine ====
- 1995 Railroader of the Year – Edward L. Moyers
