= 2004 in rail transport =

This article lists events related to rail transport that occurred in 2004.

== Events ==
=== January events ===
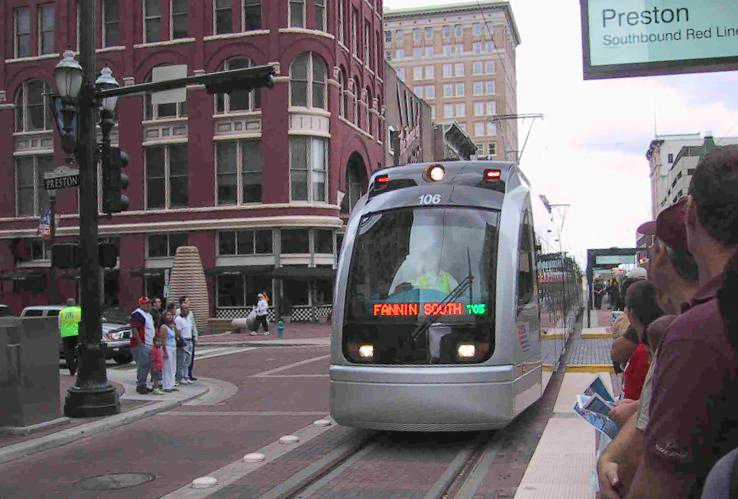
METRORail, Houston

- (United States) January 1 – METRORail light rail service in Houston, Texas, opens.

=== February events ===
- (Australia) February – Pacific National takes over Australian Transport Network.
- February 3 – The first freight train travels the entire north–south transcontinental railroad in Australia between Adelaide, South Australia, and Darwin, Northern Territory.
- (Russia) February 6 – A suicide bomber kills 41 people near Avtozavodskaya subway station on Moscow Metro's Zamoskvoretskaya Line. See: February 2004 Moscow Metro bombing

=== March events ===
- March 11 – 2004 Madrid train bombings: Simultaneous bombings on Cercanías commuter trains in Madrid (Spain) kill 191 people and injure more than 1,800.
- March 13 – First services are operated by M250 series Super Rail Cargo high speed freight electric multiple units of the Japan Freight Railway Company.
- March 20 – An agreement between the governments of Thailand and Laos is signed to extend the railway to Thanaleng Railway Station in Laos, about 3.5 km (2.2 mi) from the First Thai–Lao Friendship Bridge, which would become the first railway link to Laos.
- March 28 – First services operate on Binhai Mass Transit (or Jinbin light rail) in Tianjin, China, including No. 1 bridge (25.8 kilometres (16 mi) in length).
- (South Korea) March 30 – High-speed train service is inaugurated in Korea between Seoul and Daegu.

=== April events ===
- April – The United States Court of Appeals for the Eighth Circuit in Pierre, South Dakota, rules that the Dakota, Minnesota and Eastern Railroad may use eminent domain to purchase land in South Dakota in order to build the railroad's extension into Wyoming's Powder River Basin.
- (United Kingdom) April – Great North Eastern Railways, operators of services on the East Coast Main Line in England and Scotland, introduce 802.11b wireless LAN access to the Internet on their Mallard InterCity 225 trains.
- (South Korea) April 1 – High speed train service is inaugurated in Korea between Seoul and Busan; the trains make the trip in 2 hours and 40 minutes.
- (Japan) April 1 - Tokyo subway system, Tokyo Metro replaced and private company from Teito Rapid Transit Authority.
- (Philippines) April 5 - The Manila Line 2 commenced almost full commercial operations by opening the segment from Araneta Center–Cubao Station up to Legarda Station.
- (United States) April 6 – Amtrak passenger train City of New Orleans en route to Chicago from New Orleans derails near Flora, Mississippi, resulting in one fatality.
- (Australia) April 18 – Connex takes over the half of the Melbourne suburban rail network formerly operated by M-Train.
- (European Union) April 29 – The European Railway Agency , headquartered in Lille, France, is formed.

=== May events ===
- (United States) May 1 – The MAX Yellow Line, Interstate Avenue light rail line, opens in Portland, Oregon.
- May 9 – Construction begins on a railway tunnel under the Bosphorus strait in Turkey; the tunnel opened for service in 2013.
- (Canada) May 10 – Canadian National Railway acquires Bessemer and Lake Erie Railroad and Duluth, Missabe and Iron Range Railway
- (United States) May 15 – With repairs to tunnels 8 and 16 complete and destroyed bridges rebuilt, including the Goat Canyon Trestle, the Carrizo Gorge Railway officially reopens freight service to Plaster City and the Union Pacific Railroad interchange.

=== June events ===
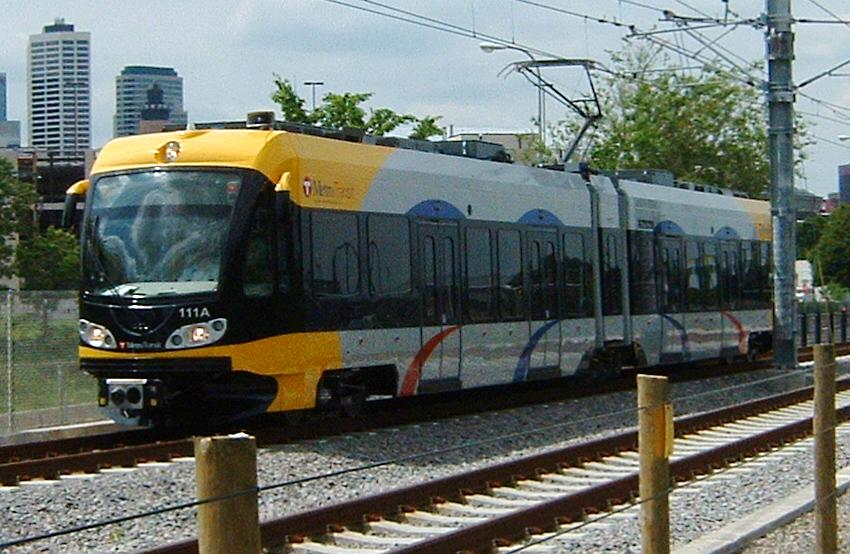
Hiawatha Line

- (United States) June – the 150th anniversary of the Grand Excursion is commemorated with special runs by Milwaukee Road 261 and Canadian Pacific 2816 along the northern Mississippi River.
- (United States) June – Caltrain finishes their two-year-long CTX project, which included strengthening the tracks between San Francisco and San Jose and introducing an all new CTC system. This project allowed for the start of Baby Bullet express service and the resumption of weekend service on the route.
- June 7 – The high speed Gautrain between Johannesburg and Pretoria, South Africa is announced; it is expected to open in 2009.
- (Spain) June 23 – Madrid Metro orders 698 new subway cars valued at €1 billion; the order is shared by Bombardier and Siemens.
- (United States) June 25 – The Causeway Street Elevated streetcar line in Boston is closed.
- June 26
  - (United States) The Hiawatha Line light rail service in Minneapolis, Minnesota opens to the public.
  - (Spain) An AVE Class 102 train reaches a new speed record of 365 km/h (227 mph) during type approval test runs.
- (Republic of Ireland) June 30 – In Ireland the first stage of Dublin's LUAS light rail system opens, the "Green Line" from Sandyford to St. Stephen's Green in the city centre. The route follows the old Harcourt Street railway line for the most part.

=== July events ===
- (Canada) July 14 – Canadian National Railway completes its purchase of BC Rail.
- (United States) July 15 – Dennis H. Miller is promoted to president of the Iowa Interstate Railroad.
- July 25 – Thieves steal two brass handles and four copper pipes from the Fairy Queen steam locomotive in New Delhi, India.
- (China) July 28 – Phase 1 of Wuhan Metro's Line 1 connecting Huangpulu Station to Zongguan Station opens.
- (Republic of Ireland) July 29 – The Dublin to Rosslare Europort route becomes the first in the Irish Republic to have locomotive hauled trains completely replaced by diesel railcars.

=== August events ===
- (United States) August 1 – Iowa Interstate Railroad takes over operations of a daily freight train from Iowa City, Iowa, to Cedar Rapids, Iowa, from the Cedar Rapids and Iowa City Railway.
- August 15 – Fourth rail was finished in 13 km section between Helsinki, the capital of Finland and Kerava, its suburb.
- August 31 – The United States Surface Transportation Board renews the authority of TTX Corporation to continue pooling and leasing railroad rolling stock for ten more years, over the protests of other rolling stock leasing companies.

=== September events ===
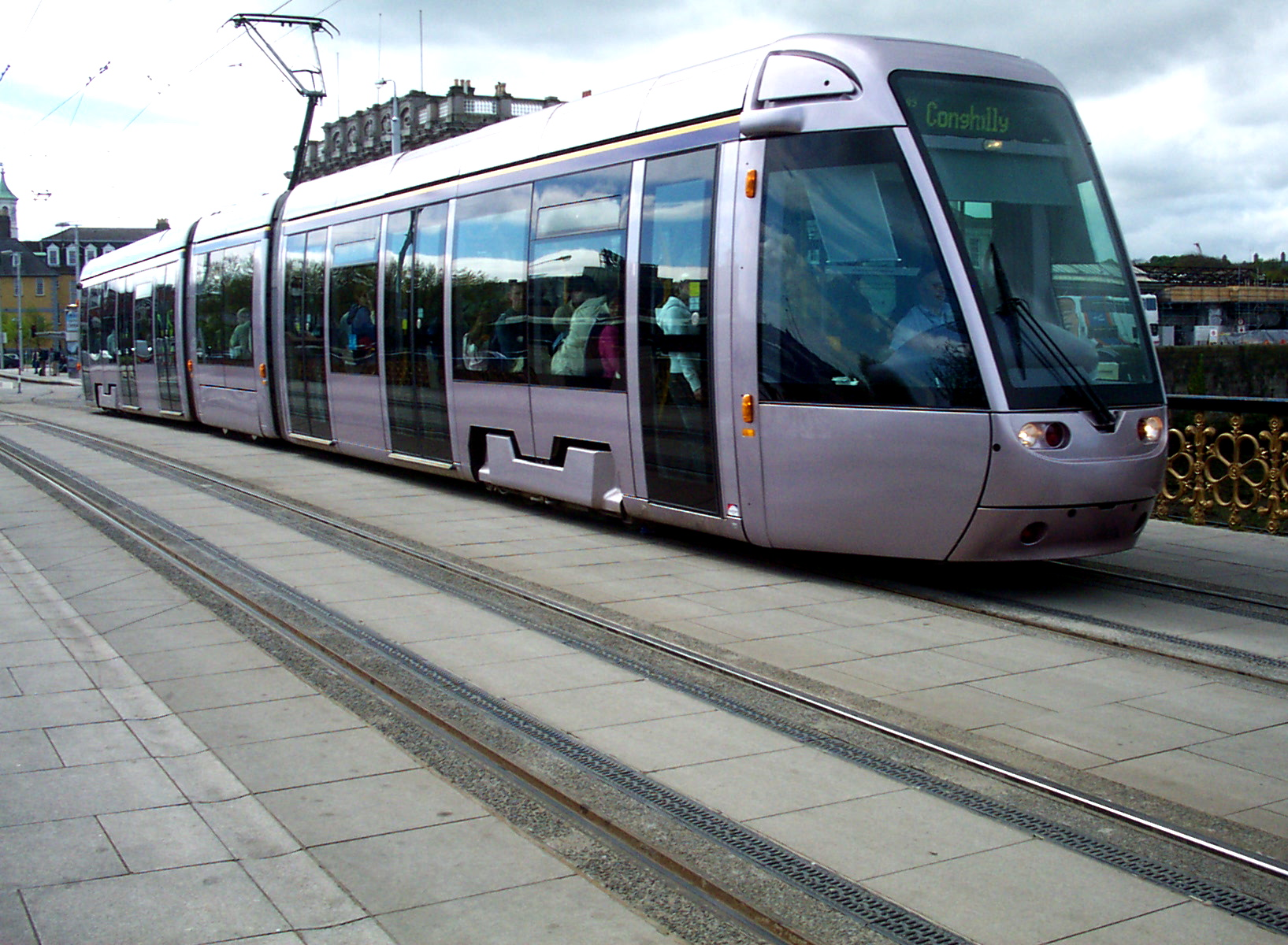
Luas Red Line, Dublin

- (Republic of Ireland) September – In Ireland, following the replacement of the Cahir viaduct, the Limerick junction to Waterford section of railway reopens after nearly a year after the viaduct collapsed under a cement train.
- (Canada) September 3 – The Canadian Museum of Rail Travel, in Cranbrook, British Columbia, holds grand opening ceremonies for its new museum facilities.
- (United States) September 8 – Burlington Northern and Santa Fe Railway opens the second railroad "flyover" bypass in Kansas City, Missouri.
- (United States) September 11 – Chicago Transit Authority installs a new electric third rail along the Yellow Line to replace the aging overhead trolley wire dating from the pre-1963 Chicago North Shore and Milwaukee Railroad; this eliminates CTA's last stretch of trolley wire operation.
- (Canada) September 13 – The Cape Breton and Central Nova Scotia Railway files its second application to abandon most of its trackage on Cape Breton Island.
- September 28
  - (Republic of Ireland) The second LUAS line opens, the "Red Line" linking Tallaght in west Dublin to the city centre and Heuston and Connolly stations on the main Irish railway network.
  - (United States) Charles Wickliffe Moorman IV is promoted to president of Norfolk Southern.
  - (Sweden) Railpower Technologies signs a memorandum of understanding with Swedish Train Technology to perform hybrid locomotive conversions in Europe.

=== October events ===
- (United States) October – General Motors Electro-Motive Division introduces the EMD SD70M-2.
- (United States) October – Amtrak opens a new maintenance facility in Oakland, California.
- (United States) October 3 – The Southwestern Railroad leases the Carlsbad Subdivision (183 miles of track between Clovis and Carlsbad, New Mexico) from the Burlington Northern and Santa Fe Railway.
- (Australia) October 4 – Transperth's Joondalup line is extended from Currambine to Clarkson.
- (Japan) October 6 – Aonami Line, Nagoya to Kinjō-futō route start in Aichi Prefecture.
- (Canada) October 14 – The Canadian Transportation Safety Board issues its final report on the CN accident of May 2, 2002; the report blames the truck driver's fatigue as the cause of the accident and admonishes fire crews for less-than-optimal training in hazardous materials.
- (Canada) October 15 – Canadian National Railway announces that it is selling its locomotive remote control business unit (which produced the Beltpack control system) to Cattron Group, Inc., so the railroad can focus on operations.
- (United States) October 18 – Rocky Mountain Railtours officially changes its name to Rocky Mountaineer Vacations.
- (Canada) October 21 – The first railroad conductors graduate from British Columbia Institute of Technology's 32-week course.
- (Canada) October 22 – Canadian National Railway (CN) announces that it will open shipping offices in Shanghai and Beijing; the office will advertise CN's shipping abilities to North American destinations, especially on the Pacific coast.
- (United States) October 27 – The North American rail labor union Brotherhood of Maintenance of Way Employees votes to merge with the Teamsters.
- (Philippines) October 29 - The Manila Line 2 commenced full commercial operations by opening the remaining segment from Legarda Station up to Recto Station.

=== November events ===
- (United States) November 1 – Amtrak discontinues the Palmetto south of Savannah, Georgia, replacing rail service to several towns in western Central Florida with Amtrak Thruway bus service. The Pennsylvanian west of Harrisburg, Pennsylvania is also discontinued, with the rest merged into the Keystone Service and Three Rivers lines.
- (United States) November 3 – Progressive Rail leases former Wisconsin Central Railway track in northern Wisconsin and begins operations on the line under its subsidiary railroad, Wisconsin Northern Railroad.
- November 8 – Canadian National, Canadian Pacific and Norfolk Southern announce an operating agreement to speed shipments between eastern Canada and the eastern United States.
- (United States) November 20 - NoMa-Gallaudet University Station (formerly New York Avenue-Florida Avenue-Gallaudet University), the first infill station to be built between two existing stations on the Washington Metro, is opened on the Washington D.C. Metro Red Line.
- (United States) November 23 – The new Wisconsin Northern Railroad begins operations on leased Union Pacific Railroad (formerly Chicago and North Western Transportation Company) and Canadian National Railway (formerly Wisconsin Central) tracks.

=== December events ===
- (United States) December 4 – Second phase of the Hiawatha Line opens, connecting Minneapolis, Minnesota to MSP Airport and the Mall of America in Bloomington
- (United States) December 5 – Metro-North Commuter Railroad Company retires the last of the electric multiple unit passenger cars built by Pullman-Standard for the New York Central in 1962–1965. The cars are replaced with new cars built by Bombardier.
- December 12
  - (France) SNCF disallows smoking on all French TGV trains.
  - (Switzerland) Swiss Federal Railways begins the first phase of implementing its Rail2000 plan to improve service.
- (Canada) December 13 – Bombardier president Paul Tellier announces his retirement.
- December 17 – The last X'Trapolis train enters service with Connex in Melbourne, Australia.
- (United States) December 18 - The Washington Metro Blue Line is extended from Addison Road-Seat Pleasant to Largo Town Center (now Downtown Largo) in Lake Arbor, Maryland. The extension, totaling 3.2 miles (5.2 km) adding the Morgan Boulevard and Largo Town Center (now Downtown Largo) stations, is the first WMATA project to go beyond the Capital Beltway in Prince George's County.
- December 21
  - (Germany) Siemens receives an order to build 60 new ICE trainsets for service between Moscow and Saint Petersburg, Russia; the new equipment is expected to enter service in 2007.
  - KCR Ma On Shan Rail opens in Hong Kong.
- December 28 – Shenzhen Metro begins operation in Shenzhen, China.

== Accidents ==
- February 6 – February 2004 Moscow metro bombing – A male suicide bomber killed 41 people near Avtozavodskaya subway station on the Zamoskvoretskaya Line in Moscow.
- February 15 – The Tebay rail accident occurred when four railway workers working on the West Coast Main Line were killed by a runaway wagon near Tebay, Cumbria, England.
- February 18 – Nishapur train disaster: A train carrying a convoy of petrol, fertiliser, and sulfur derails and explodes in Iran, killing 320 people.
- April 22 – In the Ryongchon disaster, a flammable cargo explodes at the railway station in the town of Ryongchŏn, North Korea, near the border with China; the explosion occurs only a few hours after North Korean leader Kim Jong-il passed through the station en route back to the capital from a secret meeting in China.
- May 19 – Two BNSF Railway rock trains (#6351 north and #6789 south) collide near Gunter, Texas, killing one person and seriously injuring three others. The cause was the southbound train not stopping at its assigned stopping point for reasons unknown.
- May 31 – A fire erupts in one of the Seattle Center Monorail trains; of the 150 passengers aboard at the time, only 5 required treatment for minor injuries and no deaths occurred.
- June 17 – The Karanjadi train crash was the accidental derailment of a passenger train at Karanjadi, a village in Maharashtra, India, on June 17, 2004. 20 people were killed and well over 100 injured in the crash, which was the result of heavy monsoon rains.
- October 23 – The Chūetsu earthquake, 6.8 magnitude, in Japan causes the first derailment of a Shinkansen train; the train was traveling 200 km/h (125 mph) on the Tokyo-Niigata line, but no fatalities were reported.
- November 6 – Seven people die in the Ufton Nervet rail crash in Berkshire, England.
- November 16 – The northbound high speed tilt train Spirit of Townsville from Brisbane, bound for Cairns, failed to slow down for a sharp 60 km/h curve at Berajondo, Queensland, Australia, derailing the train; although seven of the train's passenger cars and the leading power car left the tracks, remarkably there were no fatalities. See Cairns Tilt Train derailment, High-speed train derailment in central Queensland.
- December 26 – Approximately 1700 are killed in the Queen of the Sea train disaster, the world's worst rail disaster to date as the Sri Lankan train is overwhelmed by a tsunami created by the Indian Ocean earthquake.

== Deaths ==
=== August deaths ===
- August 19 – John Francis Nash, Vice President of Operations for the New York Central and president of Pittsburgh and Lake Erie Railroad and Lehigh Valley Railroad (b. 1908).

=== September deaths ===
- September 1 – Alastair Morton, chief executive of Eurotunnel 1987–1996, chairman of Strategic Rail Authority 1999–2001, dies (b. 1938).
- September 2 – Robert R. Dowty, construction foreman for the replica Jupiter and 119 steam locomotives at the Golden Spike National Historic Site at Promontory, Utah (b. 1923).
- September 5 – Nelson W. Bowers, president of the National Railway Historical Society (1983–1987); (b. 1931).
- September 6 – W. H. Krome George, director of Norfolk Southern 1979–1990 (b, 1918).

=== November deaths ===
- November 22 – Edward Blossom, trolley and interurban streetcar restorationist, founder of Dushore Car Company (b. 1930).

=== December deaths ===
- December 1 – Jack Anderson, Chief mechanical engineer for and co-owner of the Mount Rainier Scenic Railroad, and chief mechanical engineer for the Nevada Northern Railway Museum (b. 1953).

== Industry awards ==
=== Japan ===
Awards presented by Japan Railfan Club

- 2004 Blue Ribbon Award: JR Shikoku 5100 type bilevel cab car Marine Liner EMU
- 2004 Laurel Prize: (not awarded)

=== North America ===
2004 E. H. Harriman Awards

Group	Gold medal	Silver medal	Bronze medal
A	Norfolk Southern Railway	BNSF Railway	Union Pacific Railroad
B	Metra	Soo Line Railroad	Illinois Central Railroad
C	Guilford Rail System	Wheeling and Lake Erie Railroad	Providence and Worcester Railroad
S&T	Terminal Railroad Association of St. Louis	Conrail	Alton and Southern Railway

Awards presented by Railway Age magazine

- 2004 Railroader of the Year: Robert J. Ritchie (CP)
- 2004 Regional Railroad of the Year: Wheeling and Lake Erie Railroad
- 2004 Short Line Railroad of the Year: Nittany and Bald Eagle Railroad

=== United Kingdom ===
Train Operator of the Year

- 2004: Eurostar
