= 1999 in rail transport =

This article lists events related to rail transport that occurred in 1999.

== Events ==
=== January events ===
- January 15 – The Harbour Island People Mover ends service between Downtown Tampa and Harbour Island in Tampa, Florida, United States.
- January 25 – The New York City Transit Authority installs the first MetroCard Vending Machines at two subway stations in the city.

=== February events ===
- February 25 – The Tozai Subway Line in Sapporo, Japan, is extended from Kotoni Station to Miyanosawa Station.

=== March events ===
- March 15 – In the Bourbonnais train accident, the southbound Amtrak train 59, City of New Orleans, strikes a loaded semi-truck on a grade crossing in Bourbonnais, Illinois; all but three of the passenger cars derail, killing 11 of the train's passengers. The NTSB attributes the cause to the truck driver trying to beat the train at the crossing.

=== April events ===
- April – Final trains operate between Asunción and Ypacarai, the last regular passenger service in Paraguay and, arguably, the world's last commuter service worked wholly by steam locomotives.
- April 12 – A train on the Wuppertal Schwebebahn is derailed, plunging into the Wupper and killing five.
- April 15 – First freight train operated under concession by Ferrovias Guatemala (subsidiary of Railroad Development Corporation) to rehabilitate the national rail network, disused since 1996.

=== May events ===
- May 14 – The first section of the London Underground Jubilee Line Extension opens between Stratford and North Greenwich in east London.
- May 30 – The Midland Metro connecting Birmingham and Wolverhampton is opened in the West Midlands of England.

=== June events ===
- June 1 - The LRT Putra Line expands from Pasar Seni to Gombak. The stretch also includes Malaysia's first subway line.
- June 1 – The end of Conrail, which is officially split up on this date, all operations being transferred to CSX and Norfolk Southern.
- June 12 – The rebuilding of Fremont-Centerville is completed.
- June 28 – The Guangzhou Metro Line One is fully completed and operational.

=== July events ===
- July 1 – The Illinois Central Railroad is taken over by Canadian National and ceases to exist after 148 years.
- July 2 – In Seoul, South Korea, Line 8 of the Seoul Metropolitan Subway is extended from Jamsil to Amsa (4.6 km (2.9 mi)).
- July 16 – Indian Railways' Grand Trunk Express on its way to Delhi collides with derailed freight cars near Mathura, India; 17 people die and 200 more are injured in the accident.

=== August events ===
- August 1 – Gauhati rail disaster: two trains carrying 2,500 people collide at the remote station of Gaisal, 310 miles from the city of Gauhati in West Bengal, India, killing more than 285 people.
- August 22 – NSB Gardermobanen opens Romerike Tunnel (14.58-kilometre (9.06 mi)) in Norway, the longest railway tunnel in Europe north of the Alps, completing the Gardermoen Line.
- August 30 – The United States Surface Transportation Board approves Utah Railway's petition to haul freight on the former Union Pacific line between Salt Lake City and Draper, a line now owned by Utah Transit Authority.

=== September events ===
- September 3 – RailAmerica takes over operations of former Atchison, Topeka & Santa Fe Railway subsidiary Toledo, Peoria & Western Railway, for a purchase price of approximately $18 million.
- September 18 – Trillium Rail subsidiary Port Colborne Terminal Railway begins operations on 41 miles (66 km) of track in Ontario's Niagara Peninsula.

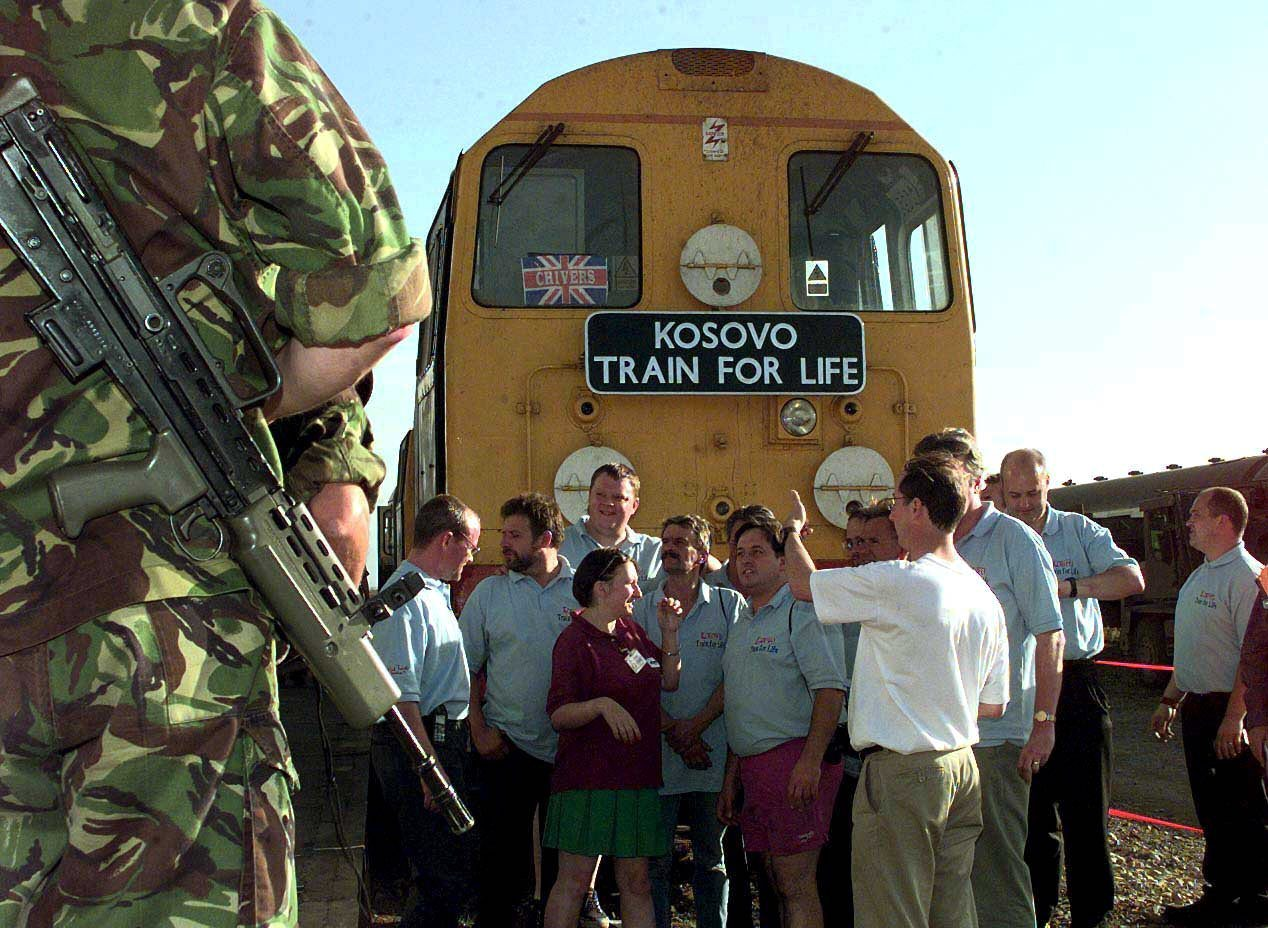
The crew of the Kosovo Train for Life in front of the train upon its arrival in Kosovo

- September 27 – After departing from England on September 17 then traveling 4,500 kilometres (2,800 mi), the Kosovo Train for Life arrives in Pristina, Kosovo, with a trainload of humanitarian aid.

=== October events ===
- October – SY class 2-8-2 #1772 is completed at Tangshan, People's Republic of China, thought to be the world's last steam locomotive built for commercial service. She is delivered to the Tiefa Mining Railway.
- October 5 – The Ladbroke Grove rail crash occurs at Ladbroke Grove Junction, a few miles west of Paddington railway station, when two passenger trains collide nearly head-on killing 31 and injuring 400; the cause is attributed to the placement of a signal (showing a stop indication) that could not be seen far enough down the track for drivers to react in time.
- October 18 – After 15 months, three months ahead of schedule, the $74 million project to rebuild the Franklin Avenue Shuttle in New York City is completed; the shuttle as well as four stations reopen for service.
- October 22 – Romeriksporten, Norway's longest railway tunnel, is taken into use.

=== November events ===
- November 6 – The first LRT Line in Singapore, Bukit Panjang LRT Line, opened.
- November 15 – The New Pflersch Tunnel between Gossensaß and Brenner stations opens, replacing the old, winding alignment.
- November 19 – Vereina Tunnel opens to traffic on the Rhaetian Railway in Switzerland.

=== December events ===
- December 2 – Glenbrook rail accident occurs near Sydney, New South Wales, Australia.
- December 6 – Manchester Metrolink in England is extended to Broadway.
- December 15 – The second rapid transit line of the Philippines which is the Manila Line 3, begins partial operations from North Avenue Station to Buendia Station.
- December 22 – The London Underground Jubilee Line Extension is finally fully operational with the start of services at Westminster tube station, although through running has been in operation since November.

=== Unknown date events ===
- Amtrak begins a massive rebuild program to overhaul the railroad's fleet of EMD AEM-7 locomotives at the Wilmington, Delaware, shops.

== Awards ==
=== North America ===
1999 E. H. Harriman Awards

Group	Gold medal	Silver medal	Bronze medal
A	Norfolk Southern	Burlington Northern & Santa Fe Railway	CSX
B	Illinois Central Railroad	Kansas City Southern Railway	NJ Transit
C	Bessemer & Lake Erie Railroad	Duluth, Winnipeg and Pacific Railroad	Guilford Rail System
S&T	Belt Railway of Chicago	Port Terminal Railroad Association	Patapsco & Back Rivers Railroad

Awards presented by Railway Age magazine

- 1999 Railroader of the Year: Edward Burkhardt (Wisconsin Central)
- 1999 Regional Railroad of the Year: Providence & Worcester Railroad
- 1999 Short Line Railroad of the Year: South Central Florida Express

=== United Kingdom ===
Train Operator of the Year

- 1999: Midland Mainline
