= 2010 in rail transport =

This article lists events related to rail transport that occurred in 2010.

== Events ==
=== By month ===
==== February events ====
- (South Korea) February 18 – In Seoul, Line 3 of the Seoul Metropolitan Subway is extended from Suseo to Ogeum (3 km (1.9 mi)).

==== March events ====
- (Philippines) March 22 – Operations of the Manila Line 1 is extended from Monumento to Balintawak marking the first station to open on the new North Extension of the line.

==== April events ====
- (Singapore) April 17 – The Circle MRT line Stage 1 and 2 were to be ready for service using the 3 car Alstom train.

==== May events ====
- (India) May 2 – Indian Railways phases out WCG-2 electric locomotives.
- (United Kingdom) May 23 – The newly extended East London Line begins full service between West Croydon, Crystal Palace and Dalston Junction, following a preview service from April 27 as far south as New Cross and New Cross Gate.
- May 28 – Jnaneswari Express train derailment: A train derailment and collision in the Paschim Medinipur district of West Bengal, India, causes the deaths of at least 141 passengers.

==== June events ====
- (Germany) June – First Vectron locomotives completed by Siemens Mobility.
- (South Africa) June 8 – The first section of the Gautrain is complete, where trains run between Sandton and OR Tambo International Airport, just in time for the FIFA World Cup being held in the country.
- (Norway) June 22 – Bergen Light Rail is opened.
- (United States) June 25 – The Brown M, V, and W of the New York City Subway make their last rides.

==== July events ====
- (China) July 1 – High-speed trains on the Shanghai–Nanjing line begin running, cutting journey times between the two cities by more than an hour, to just 73 minutes
- (Japan) July 17 – Keisei Narita Airport Line begins operations, along with new Skyliner services between Keisei-Ueno and Narita Airport Station using brand new medium-speed AE series express trains, making it the second Japanese mainline to be operated at 160 km/h speed (the first was the Hokuhoku Line).
- (India) July 20 – Larsen & Toubro are announced as the preferred bidder for construction of the Hyderabad Metro, costing a proposed Rs122 billion and with an expected finish date of 2014.
- (China) July 29 – Phase 2 of Wuhan Metro Line 1 connecting Dijiao Station to Huangpulu Station and connecting Zongguan Station to Dongwudadao Station opens.

==== August events ====
- (France) August 9 - First day of operation for the Light rail Rhônexpress service linking Lyon city centre and the Airport.
- (European Union) August 11 - The European Commission approves the €1.9bn acquisition of Arriva by German rail company Deutsche Bahn. Arriva's transport operations in Germany are subject to sale to another operator.
- August 12 - Malaysia introduces electrified intercity trains with the opening of KTM Electric Train System from Ipoh to Seremban.
- (Thailand) August 23 - The Suvarnabhumi Airport rail link opens after a four-year delay, connecting Suvarnabhumi Airport with the City Centre.
- (United States) August 26 - Construction began on the 23-mile (37 km) long East Corridor in Denver, connecting the International Airport with Union Station. Construction is scheduled to end sometime in 2015.

==== September events ====
- (Republic of Ireland) September 3 - Irish Rail trains began serving the town of Dunboyne after a gap of 43 years. Until the M3 Parkway station is built, all services on the Dublin–Navan railway line will terminate here.
- (United Kingdom) September 13 - Refurbishment of Newport railway station, which includes a building consisting mostly of ETFE is completed, in preparation of Newport's hosting of the Ryder Cup Golf tournament. Car parking facilities have yet to be finished.
- (United Kingdom) September 20 - A new Manchester Metrolink station serving the MediaCityUK complex opens, with trams being served via a small spur off the main Eccles Line.
- (China) September 25 – Guangzhou Metro's Line 4 extension connecting Chebeinan to Huangcun opens.

==== October events ====
- (United States) October 4 - New restrooms, a larger waiting area, and the re-installation of air conditioning fans first removed in the 1960s are announced as part of Amtrak's Capital funding project for Chicago Union Station
- (European Union) October 7 - Eurostar places a £700m order for 10 new high-speed trains with Siemens, as well as a refurbishment of its current set of trains. The new trains, dubbed as 'e-320' will also be inter-operable, allowing them to run on much of Europe's high-speed network.
- (United States) October 7 - Construction of the planned Mass Transit Tunnel running under the Hudson River and leading into Penn Station is cancelled after a thirty-day risk review by New Jersey Transit and Federal Transit Administration officials revealed costs could exceed as much as double its $8.7bn budget.
- (Switzerland) October 15 - 'Breakthrough' is completed in the construction of the Gotthard Base Tunnel (57 km (35 mi)) after fourteen years of tunnelling.
- (Canada) October 22 - The Société de transport de Montréal along with Bombardier and Alstom sign a deal worth $1.2bn meaning that 468 metro cars will replace the MR-63 stock on the Montreal Metro. Design and construction will take place at both Bombardier's and Alstom's factories in Quebec.
- (Philippines) October 22 – Operations of the Manila Line 1 is extended again from Balintawak Station to Roosevelt Station marking the last station to open on the new three station North Extension of the line with the North Avenue Grand Central Station being put on hold for 8 years.
- (United States) October 29 - SEPTA's Silverliner V cars in service.

==== November Events ====
- (South Korea) November 1 - Construction of phase 2 in building the Seoul–Busan high-speed line is completed, allowing passengers to travel between the two cities in under 2½ hours. The project cost an estimated ₩7 945 billion, with an extra 35,000 passengers per day projected to use this service.
- mid-November - Arenaways, the first open-access railway operator in Italy, begins non-stop passenger operations between Milan and Turin, competing with national monopoly operator Trenitalia using TRAXX locomotives leased from Alpha Trains.

==== December events ====
- December 4 – The extension of the Tōhoku Shinkansen in Japan from Hachinohe to Shin-Aomori opens.
- (China) December 28 – Phase 1 of Shenzhen Metro Line 2 opens connecting Chiwan to Window of the World.
- (Finland) (Russia) December 12 – International high-speed service between Helsinki and Saint-Petersburg opens.

=== Unknown date events ===
- (United Kingdom) – Train travel in Britain during 2010 attained its highest peacetime level since the 1920s, according to the Association of Train Operating Companies. The number of train journeys reached 1.3bn, a figure not seen since 1928. The proportion of people using the train has decreased substantially since then, while the amount of usable rail track has more than halved.

== Accidents ==
- February 15 – The Halle train collision in which a National Railway Company of Belgium local train collides with an inter-city service at Buizingen, killing 19, due to a signal passed at danger and absence of a transmission balise-locomotive system.
- April 12 – The Merano train derailment happens when a train derails between Latsch and Kastelbell, near Merano, Italy, after running into a landslide, causing nine deaths and injuring 28.
- April 21 – The Pretoria runaway in which a train of carriages runs away for twelve miles (19 km) from Centurion Station and derails at Pretoria, South Africa, killing three and seriously injuring seven.
- May 23 – The Jiangxi train derailment in which a train travelling from Shanghai to Guilin in Jiangxi, China derails, killing at least 19 people.
- May 28 – The Gyaneshwari Express derailment in the West Midnapore district of West Bengal, India. It is disputed as to whether sabotage or a bomb caused damage to the track, which in turn leads to a train derailment before an oncoming goods train hit the loose carriages killing at least 141 passengers.
- (United Kingdom) June 6 – The Falls of Cruachan derailment occurs on the West Highland Line in Scotland, when a passenger train travelling between Glasgow and Oban derails after a suspected landslide.
- June 21 – The Yanga train derailment occurs when a train travelling between Brazzaville and Pointe Noire in the Republic of the Congo is derailed and plunges into a ravine. The death toll will have risen to 76 people and injuries to 745 by June 23.
- (Spain) June 23 – Thirteen die in the Castelldefels train accident at a level crossing in Castelldefels near Barcelona.
- June 28 – Ústí nad Labem derailment at Ústí nad Labem, Czech Republic. The driver is killed and eleven passengers injured.

== Industry awards ==
=== Japan ===
Awards presented by the Japan Railfan Club

- 2010 Blue Ribbon Award: JR East E259 series Narita Express EMU
- 2010 Laurel Prize: Kintetsu 22600 series Ace EMU

=== North America ===
2010 E. H. Harriman Awards

Group	Gold medal	Silver medal	Bronze medal
A			
B			
C			
S&T			

Awards presented by Railway Age magazine

- 2010 Railroader of the Year: Matthew K. Rose (BNSF)
- 2010 Regional Railroad of the Year:
- 2010 Short Line Railroad of the Year:

=== United Kingdom ===
Train Operator of the Year

- 2010: First Great Western

== Deaths ==
- March 7 – Mac Sebree, well-known American rail-transport writer and publisher (b. 1932).
- June 23 – Michael Cobb, British railway historian, dies (b. 1916).
- August 20 – Charles S. Roberts, American railroad historian, dies (b. 1930).
