= 2009 in rail transport =

This article lists events related to rail transport that occurred in 2009.

== Events ==
=== January events ===
- (United States) January 1 – Oscar Grant III is shot by BART Police Officer Johannes Mehserle on a busy Bay Area Rapid Transit platform. See: Shooting of Oscar Grant
- (United Kingdom) January 12 – official opening of Docklands Light Railway London City Airport branch extension under the River Thames to Woolwich Arsenal.
- (United States) January 23 – Canadian National Railway closes on purchase of Elgin, Joliet and Eastern Railway.

=== February events ===
- (United States) February 2 – opening of WES Commuter Rail line from Wilsonville, Oregon, to Beaverton; see https://trimet.org for more information.
- February 17 – The international connection between Perpignan, Roussillon, France, and Figueres, Catalonia, Spain, through the Perthus Tunnel on the Perpignan–Barcelona high-speed rail line is officially opened.
- (Singapore) February 28 – opening of East–West MRT line extension of additional two stations from Boon Lay. Trains by this date no longer terminate at Boon Lay Station.

=== March events ===
- (Turkey) March – first section of Istanbul-Ankara High Speed Rail Line, between Ankara and Eskişehir (245-kilometre (152 mi)), opens.
- (Thailand) (Laos) – the First Thai–Lao Friendship Bridge is officially opened to rail traffic.
- (United States) March 16 – reopening of New York City's South Ferry Station after four years of renovation.
- (Japan) March 20 – Hanshin Namba Line, Amagasaki-Namba route to open, with Hanshin Sannomiya-Kintetsu Nara direct commuter express train starting.
- (Jordan) March 31 – the deadline for securing financing for the Amman-Zarqa Light Rail System by the Kuwaiti-led consortium passed, effectively voiding the projects after more than 10 years in planning. The deadline had already been extended twice before.

=== May events ===
- (Russia) May – Russian Railways introduces hybrid DT1 multiple unit into service out of Baltiysky railway station in Saint Petersburg.
- (United States) May 1 – Pan Am Southern, a joint venture between Pan Am Railways and Norfolk Southern Railway, begins operation.
- May 28 – Singapore Circle MRT line Stage 3 ready for service using three-car Alstom trains.

=== July events ===
- (United States) July 18 – Sound Transit Central Link light rail line in Seattle, Washington opens, utilizing the Downtown Seattle Transit Tunnel.
- (Iran) (Pakistan) – link between Kerman and Zahedan joins Europe and the Middle East subcontinent for the first time, albeit with break-of-gauge.

=== August events ===
- August 16 – Kowloon Southern Link, an extension of the KCRC West Rail Line in Hong Kong, completed and opened.
- August 17 – opening of Canada Line rapid transit line in Vancouver, British Columbia.
- (United States) August 30 – new Portland Transit Mall light-rail alignment opens for service, initially (until September 12) used only by the MAX Yellow Line.

=== September events ===
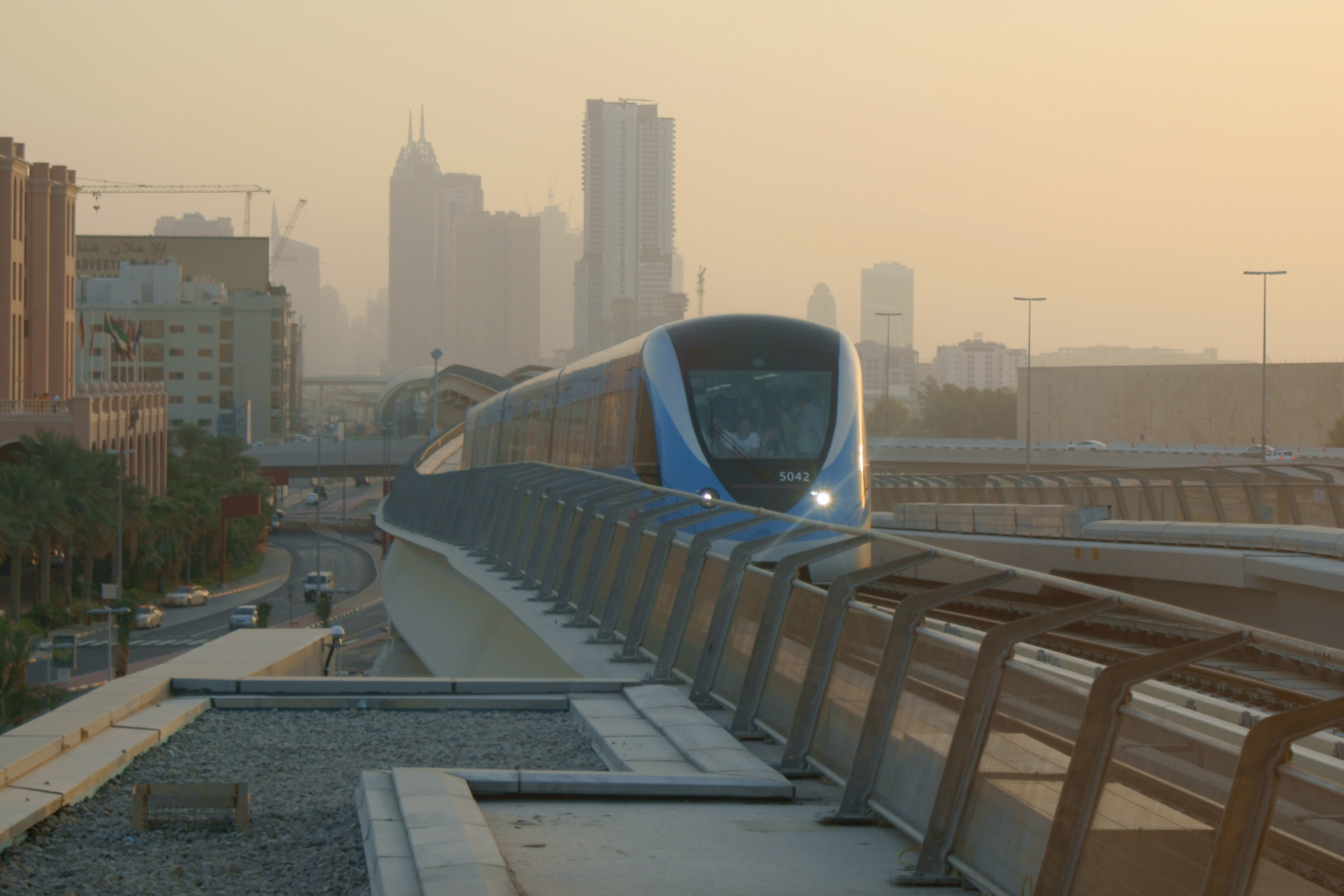
Dubai Metro on opening day

- (United Arab Emirates) September 9 – partial opening of Dubai Metro.
- (United States) September 12 – MAX Green Line light rail line in Portland, Oregon, opens, transporting riders from Portland State University to Clackamas Town Center Transit Center.
- (Australia) September 20 – the Powerhouse Museum's 3265 is recommissioned with a ceremony at Central station and shuttle rides with the locomotive to Bankstown.

=== November events ===
- (United Kingdom) November 13 – as announced on July 1, the British InterCity East Coast Main Line passenger rail franchise is transferred at 23:59 from National Express East Coast to the Department for Transport-owned company Directly Operated Railways Ltd for operation by its subsidiary East Coast Main Line Company Ltd, trading as East Coast, prior to retendering from late 2010.
- (India) November 15 – The platform 6 of Borivali station closes down for three months to enable the extension of the platform and work on the new platform 6A.
- (Norway) November 16 – the section from Stavanger to Sandnes on the Sørland Line opens with double track.
- (Russia) November 27 – 2009 Nevsky Express bombing: A terrorist bomb explodes under a high-speed train on the Moscow–Saint Petersburg Railway, derailing it, killing 28 passengers and injuring more than 90 others.
- November 30 – Metro Trains Melbourne (subsidiary of MTR Corporation of Hong Kong) takes over operation of suburban rail network in Melbourne, Australia, from Connex.

=== December events ===
- (United States) December – construction to restore the mainline of the Virginia and Truckee Railroad from Gold Hill to Carson City, Nevada completed.
- (Australia) December 1 – Tasmanian government-owned Tasmanian Railway Company takes over operations on the island from Pacific National.
- (United Kingdom) December 9 – services on the London Underground Circle line cease to run continuous complete circuits, for the first time since 1884.
- December 13 – The first Thalys train goes into commercial operation on the HSL-Zuid, marking the first time a high-speed train runs through the Netherlands on full speed at 300 km/h.
- (United Kingdom) December 13 – start of domestic services on High Speed 1, the UK's first high speed services run by Southeastern, from Dover Priory to London St Pancras, via Ashford International. The British Rail Class 395 trains are part of the "Javelin" service provided during the London 2012 Olympics
- December 18 – Sapsan, a high-speed railroad service in Russia, a first officially regular operation service start from Passazhirskaya of Moscow to Sankt Petersburg route.
- December 26 – Wuguang Passenger Railway high speed line between Wuhan and Guangzhou, China, opens.
- (China) December 28 – Guangzhou Metro's Line 4 extension connecting Wanshengwei to Chebeinan opens.
- (Azerbaijan) December 30 – The Green Line of the Baku Metro is extended from Nasimi to Azadliq prospekti.
- (United States) December 31 – Chicago Transit Authority's Brown Line capacity expansion project completed.

=== Unknown date events ===
- – Construction begins in the Republic of the Congo on a planned 1,000 kilometres (620 mi) of new railway lines connecting Brazzaville to Ouésso and Djambala to Pointe-Noire.

== Accidents ==
- June 22 – Washington Metro accident occurs when two afternoon southbound Metrorail trains on the Red Line are in a rear-end collision between the Takoma and Fort Totten stations in Northeast Washington, D.C., United States, killing eight passengers and the operator of the rear train, trapping several occupants, and injuring up to 100 more. The most serious accident in the Metro's history.
- (Republic of Ireland) August 21 – span of Iarnród Éireann's Broadmeadow viaduct, carrying the main line to Belfast about 13 km north of Dublin and just north of Malahide, collapses due to scour.
- (Republic of Ireland) November 16 - Unit 29026 was derailed near Wicklow when it collided with a landslip blocking the line.

== Industry awards ==
=== Japan ===
Awards presented by the Japan Railfan Club

- 2009 Blue Ribbon Award: Odakyu Electric Railway 60000 series MSE EMU
- 2009 Laurel Prize: Toyohashi Railroad T1000 series tramcar and Keihan Electric Railway 3000 series "Comfort Saloon" EMU

=== North America ===
2009 E. H. Harriman Awards

Group	Gold medal	Silver medal	Bronze medal
A			
B			
C			
S&T			

Awards presented by Railway Age magazine

- 2009 Railroader of the Year:
- 2009 Regional Railroad of the Year: Wisconsin and Southern Railroad
- 2009 Short Line Railroad of the Year:

=== United Kingdom ===
Train Operator of the Year

- 2009:

== Deaths ==
- January 10 – Jean Pelletier, chairman of VIA Rail 2001–2004, dies (b. 1935).
- February 20 – James I. C. Boyd, British railway historian, dies (b. 1921).
