= Edward L. Moyers =

American businessman

- Born: October 3, 1928 near Meridian, Mississippi, US
- Died: June 5, 2006 (aged 77); Naples, Florida, US
- Known for: railroad executive

Edward L. Moyers, Jr. (October 3, 1928 – June 5, 2006) was an American railroad executive of the 20th century. He served as president and CEO of several railroads including MidSouth Rail, Illinois Central Railroad and Southern Pacific Railroad. In 1995, Railway Age magazine named Moyers its "Railroader of the Year".

== Family and early life ==
Edward, Jr., was the son of Edward L. and Lucille (Lewis) Moyers. He was born on October 3, 1928, near Meridian, Mississippi. Moyers graduated from Louisiana Tech University with a business degree in 1955.

== Railroad career ==
Moyers worked as an executive with the Peoria and Pekin Union Railway.

In the 1980s when Illinois Central Gulf Railroad was spinning off excess lines, New York based investment firm Prospect Group purchased 412 miles (663 km) of track to form MidSouth Rail and installed Moyers as the new railroad company's first president. The purchase included the assets of Gulf and Mississippi Railroad (restructured as SouthRail Corporation), which was also owned by MidSouth Corporation, MidSouth Rail's parent company. Immediately after the purchase was complete, train schedules were updated to double service between Shreveport and Meridian. Moyers worked to improve and rebuild these lines to allow trains to increase their average speeds from 10 miles per hour (16 km/h) to 25 mph (40 km/h). After Moyers left MidSouth, the lines were later acquired by Kansas City Southern Railroad in 1993, effective on January 1, 1994.

In 1989, Moyers was appointed as president of Illinois Central Railroad by its then new owners, Prospect Group. The purchase was, in fact, all part of a plan devised by Moyers to return the Illinois Central to profitability. He soon set to work reducing costs to the railroad including cutting payroll and selling excess rolling stock. One of the more controversial projects Moyers took on as president of Illinois Central was to reduce the railroad's trackage from a completely double tracked line with ABS to a single track mainline with CTC signals. This project began in May 1989 and was completed on August 28, 1991. The scrap materials removed from the single-tracking project were sold for approximately $50 million and further reduced the railroad's supply budget by $70 million; installing CTC was estimated to save the railroad about $100 million. Moyers also tried to bring the MidSouth lines back into the Illinois Central portfolio with a takeover bid announced on December 3, 1990, a move that was seen as positive by rail analysts at the time. But MidSouth, now led by Moyers' former business partner Mark Levin, rejected the offer. Moyers retired from Illinois Central in 1993 and was succeeded as president of that railroad by E. Hunter Harrison. In 1998, Illinois Central was acquired by Canadian National Railway.

After leaving the Illinois Central and undergoing heart surgery, Moyers was asked to return to railroad service by Philip Anschutz, the executive behind the Rio Grande Railroad's purchase of Southern Pacific Railroad (SP). Moyers became chairman and CEO of Southern Pacific Company (the parent company of Southern Pacific Railroad) and president of Southern Pacific Railroad in July 1993, leading the railroad up to the merger of Southern Pacific into Union Pacific Railroad. Part of his leadership strategy at SP, like his strategy at Illinois Central, was to trim excess capacity, such as by single-tracking sections of SP's Donner Pass line. Moyers also questioned the efficiency of the former Rio Grande's Tennessee Pass line versus its Moffat Tunnel line; he noted that the steep grades of Tennessee Pass led to increased fuel and maintenance costs to the railroad, favoring the shorter and lower elevation Moffat route. Under Moyers' leadership, SP went from a $149 million loss in 1993 to earning $242 million in 1994. The Southern Pacific Company announced on February 8, 1995, that Moyers had submitted his resignation, citing advice from his physicians. Southern Pacific was acquired by Union Pacific in 1996.

Upon his retirement from SP, Railway Age recognized Moyers' contributions to the American railroad industry by naming him "Railroader of the Year" in 1995.

== Post-retirement and private life ==
Soon after Moyers had become a chief executive, in 1988 he joined the board of trustees for Millsaps College in Jackson, Mississippi, and was named a Life Trustee of the college in 1998. Moyers also gave the commencement speech at the college in 2000. He was also active with Louisiana Tech as chair of the university's Centennial Campaign and provided an endowment for honors students in the school's College of Business.

After retiring from direct railroad work, Moyers continued investing in railroad projects worldwide. He was one of the individual investors of Noel Group, which spent $8 million to acquire the western network of railroad lines in Brazil from the Brazilian government; Moyers' direct consultation and business plan development was credited as essential in this transaction that created Ferronorte.

Moyers died on June 5, 2006, in Naples, Florida. He was survived by his wife Helen, son Paul, daughter Nancy, sister Mary Ann, brother Pat, and their respective children. He was buried in Forest Lawn Memorial Park in Ruston, Louisiana.

Moyers' estate left a "considerable bequest" to Louisiana Tech and in December 2007, Louisiana Tech established the Moyers Scholarships in his memory.

Business positions
New title	President of MidSouth Rail; 1986–1989	Succeeded by Mark Levin
Preceded by Harry J. Bruce	Chairman, president and CEO of Illinois Central Railroad; 1990–1993	Succeeded by E. Hunter Harrison
Preceded by Benjamin F. Biaggini	Chairman of the Southern Pacific Company board of directors 1993–1995	merged into Union Pacific Railroad
Awards and achievements
Preceded by L. S. “Jake” Jacobson (Copper Basin Railway)	Railroader of the Year; 1995	Succeeded by Robert Krebs (ATSF) and Gerald Grinstein (BN)
