= 1990 in rail transport =

This article lists events related to rail transport that occurred in 1990.

== Events ==
=== January ===
- January 4 – Sukkur rail disaster in Pakistan kills 307 people
- January 15 – Via Rail discontinues Super Continental service and shifts The Canadian from its Canadian Pacific Railway to a Canadian National Railway route between Toronto and Vancouver, ending service to many cities and towns along the CP line, including Calgary and Regina.

=== February ===
- February 4 – The last Edmondson railway tickets are issued for regular travel on British Rail, by the agent for Pembrey station in Wales.

=== March ===
- March 7 – An accident on the Philadelphia subway near 30th Street Station, kills three and injures 150 people.
- March 12 – The PNR North Main Line reopens to Malolos after almost three years of closure. It is part of the Metrotren program.
- March 30 – Keio Sagamihara Line, Chōfu to Hashimoto of Sagamihara route officially completed, and Moto-Yawata of Ichikawa・Shinjuku of Tokyo to Hashimoto of Sagamihara route direct commuter train service to start in Japan.
- March 31 – Opening of the first phase of the Osaka Rapid Electric Tramway Line No. 7 (高速電気軌道第7号線) (Nagahori Tsurumi-ryokuchi Line) between Kyōbashi and Tsurumi-ryokuchi.

=== May ===
- May – Zürcher Verkehrsverbund formed as a coordinated public transport network in the Swiss canton of Zürich.
- May 6 – Cowan rail accident: A heritage steam train hauled by 3801 is rammed at Brooklyn, New South Wales, by a regular CityRail passenger train; six people lose their lives in the accident.
- May 28 – An Alaska Railroad train derails 19 tank cars near Dunbar. Approximately 170,000 US gallons (640,000 L) of diesel and jet fuel are spilled; the cleanup efforts last nearly three weeks.
- May 29 – Shore Line East commuter rail service in Connecticut inaugurated.

=== June ===
- June 13 – The first section of the Genova, Italy, light metro system, the Metropolitana di Genova, is opened.

=== July ===
- July 2 – First direct Berlin S-Bahn service on the elevated Stadtbahn line between Alexanderplatz and Zoologischer Garten via Friedrichstraße station since erection of the Berlin Wall following its dismantling.
- July 6 – Completion of the first MRT system in Singapore consisting of the North South line and East West line.
- July 14 – The first light rail line in Los Angeles, the Blue Line, is opened.

=== August ===
- August 18 – Gråkallbanen, part of the Trondheim Tramway in Trondheim, Norway is reopened after the city council permanently closed the tramway in 1988.

=== September ===
- September 16 – Construction of the Northern Xinjiang Railway is completed between Ürümqi and Alashankou, linking the railway lines of China and Kazakhstan, and adding 500 km to the Eurasian Land Bridge.

=== December ===
- December 1 – Construction crews on the Channel Tunnel from both England and France break through the last amount of rock separating the two tunnels, forming the first land link between the two countries for around 8,000 years.
- December 31 – Minsk Metro's Avtozavodskaya Line opens between Traktornyi Zavod and Frunzenskaya.

=== Unknown date ===
- David L. Gunn steps down from leadership of the New York City Transit Authority.
- Robert J. Ritchie succeeds William W. Stinson as president of Canadian Pacific Railway.
- The Gateway Western Railway begins operations over former Chicago and Alton Railroad tracks between Kansas City and St. Louis, Missouri.
- The 66 series begins service on the Sakaisuji Line in Osaka, Japan.
