= 2000 in rail transport =

This article lists events related to rail transport that occurred in 2000.

== Events ==
=== January events ===
- January 10 – The Tama Toshi Monorail Line extension from Tachikawa-Kita Station to Tama-Center Station in Japan opens.
- January 28 – Amtrak extends electric train operation on the Northeast Corridor from New Haven to South Station, Boston.
- January 29 – The renovated Termini station in Rome opens as part of the Great Jubilee.

=== February events ===
- February 4 – German railway saboteur Klaus-Peter Sabotta is sentenced to life imprisonment for attempted murder and extortion.
- February 29 – In Seoul, South Korea, the southern section of Line 7 of the Seoul Metropolitan Subway is opened between Onsu and Sinpung (9.2 km (5.7 mi)).

=== March events ===
- March 4 – San Francisco Municipal Railway F Market & Wharves streetcar line is extended to Fisherman's Wharf.
- March 13 – Buenos Aires Underground operator Metrovías inaugurates Fátima station on the Buenos Aires Premetro.

=== April events ===
- April 10 – In Ireland, the Dublin Area Rapid Transit system is extended southwards from Bray to Greystones and northwards from Howth Junction to Malahide.
- April 11 – CSX chairman and CEO John W. Snow succeeds Ronald J. Conway as president of the railroad.
- April 20 - The section of the Toei Oedo Line between Shinjuku and Kokuritsu-Kyōgijō opens for service in Tokyo, Japan.
- April 20–28 – 3801 and 3830 head to Melbourne, Victoria called the Millennium Aurora by the New South Wales Rail Transport Museum during the Easter Long Weekend. This would be the last time that NSW steam will ever visit Victoria.

=== May events ===
- May 11 –Tramlink opens in London, the first trams in London since 1952, largely on former heavy rail or reserved track formation.
- May 23 – Electro-Motive Division delivers to the Union Pacific the first five EMD SD70M diesel locomotives in the largest single order (1,000 locomotives) for diesel locomotives ever by a single railroad.

=== June events ===
- June 1 – The Amtrak California San Diegan is extended further north to San Luis Obispo and the service is renamed to Pacific Surfliner.
- June 7 – The Anton Anderson Memorial Tunnel, originally built for rail traffic in 1943, opens for combined rail/highway traffic, making it the longest combined rail/highway tunnel in North America.
- June 30 - The Texas Transportation Company closed.

=== July events ===
- July 1 – Opening of the Øresund Bridge bridge-tunnel carrying road traffic and the Øresund Railway between Denmark and Sweden.
- July 4 – Amtrak's new Bakersfield Station opens.
- July 9 – Metro-North Railroad restored service on the Harlem Line between Dover Plains and Wassaic, a move the railroad billed as its first service expansion since it was created in 1983.
- July 11 – Via Rail announces that it will use five sleeping cars leased from Amtrak for runs between Winnipeg and Churchill, Manitoba.
- July 14 – The United States Surface Transportation Board's temporary moratorium on railroad mergers is upheld by the U.S. Court of Appeals for the District of Columbia Circuit; the ruling contributes to the failure of the proposed BNSF/CN merger.
- July 20 – The Manila Line 3 commenced full commercial operations by opening the remaining segment from Buendia station to Taft Avenue station.
- July 21 – Manchester Metrolink, in Manchester, England, is extended to Eccles.

=== August events ===
- August 1 – In Seoul, South Korea, the central section of Line 7 of the Seoul Metropolitan Subway is opened between Sinpung and Koknuk University (18.7 km (11.6 mi)), enabling services to operate fully between Jangam and Onsu.
- August 7 – In Seoul, South Korea, the first section of Line 6 of the Seoul Metropolitan Subway is opened between Bonghwasan and Sangwolgok (4.2 km (2.6 mi)).

=== October events ===
- October 2 – Via Rail operates a funeral train for Prime Minister Pierre Trudeau between Ottawa and Montreal; the train's journey, which was frequently slowed through towns for the numerous well-wishers, was documented by a CBC news helicopter.
- October 29 – Amtrak upgrades service on the California Zephyr to daily.

=== September events ===
- September 26
  - The final 4.0 km (2.5 mi) section of the Toei Mita Line in Tokyo, Japan, opens between Meguro and Mita stations.
  - The final 5.7 km (3.5 mi) section of the Tokyo Metro Namboku Line in Tokyo, Japan, opens between Meguro and Tameike-Sanno stations.

=== December events ===
- December 11 – Amtrak's Acela Express makes its first run.
- December 12 – The final 25.7 km (16.0 mi) section of the Toei Oedo Line between Kokuritsu-Kyōgijō and Tochomae opens for service in Tokyo, Japan.
- December 15 – In Seoul, South Korea, Line 6 of the Seoul Metropolitan Subway is extended from Sangwolgok to Eungam (30.9 km (19.2 mi)).

== Accidents ==
- January 4 – The Åsta accident, a northbound BM92 multiple unit and a southbound passenger train headed by a Di 3 locomotive collided on Norway's Rørosbanen line near Åsta station, killing 19 people.
- February 6 – The Brühl train disaster; in Brühl, Germany killed 9 when a train negotiated a low speed turnout at three times the correct speed and derailed, on the West Rhine Railway.
- March 8 – Tokyo train disaster: a sideswipe collision of two Tokyo Metro trains kills 5 people near Naka-Meguro Station.
- October 17 – The Hatfield rail crash, south of Hatfield, Hertfordshire, UK, occurs when a train traveling at 115 mph derails due to a rail that breaks under it. Four people are killed, and there is considerable disruption to the national rail network as the infrastructure is reviewed.
- November 11 – A faulty heater aboard a funicular train in Kaprun, Austria, starts a fire in the train's brake fluid while the train is in a tunnel; only twelve of the train's 155 passengers survived the fire in the Kaprun disaster.
- December 2 – The Sarai Banjara rail disaster in the Punjab, India killed 46 and injured at least 150 when a freight train derailed into the path of a passenger train.
- December 30 – The Rizal Day bombings occurred around Metro Manila in the Philippines leaving 22 dead.

== Industry awards ==
=== Japan ===
Awards presented by Japan Railfan Club

- 2000 Blue Ribbon Award: JR East E26 series Cassiopeia sleeping car
- 2000 Laurel Prize:
  - Hiroden 5000 series Green Mover tramcar
  - JR Central/JR West 700 Series Shinkansen
  - JR East 209-950 series (now E231-900 series) EMU

=== North America ===
2000 E. H. Harriman Awards

Group	Gold medal	Silver medal	Bronze medal
A	Norfolk Southern		
B	Kansas City Southern Railway		
C	Gateway Western Railway		
S&T		Belt Railway of Chicago	

Awards presented by Railway Age magazine

- 2000 Railroader of the Year: The railroad worker (the award for 2000 was changed to "Railroader of the Century")
- 2000 Regional Railroad of the Year: Bessemer and Lake Erie Railroad
- 2000 Short Line Railroad of the Year: Arkansas Midland Railroad
