= 1983 in rail transport =

This article lists events related to rail transport that occurred in 1983.

== Events ==
=== January events ===
- January 1
  - The Metropolitan Transportation Authority and Connecticut Department of Transportation form Metro-North Railroad.
  - China Railway opens Zhicheng–Liuzhou railway, 885 km (550 mi) in length with 396 tunnels totalling 172 km (107 mi) and 476 bridges totalling 52 km (32 mi).
  - Amtrak takes over the operation of the Baltimore-Washington service (retitled AMDOT) under contract to Maryland Department of Transportation.
- January 2 - The first section of the Caracas Metro is opened, first rapid transit system in Venezuela.

=== February events ===
- February 27 - The first phase of the O'Hare rapid transit extension of the Chicago "L" system is placed into operation from Jefferson Park to River Road via the Kennedy Expressway median. This phase opened the Harlem, Cumberland, and River Road stations.

=== April events ===
- April 25
  - Denver and Rio Grande Western Railroad discontinues independent intercity passenger train service with the final run of the Rio Grande Zephyr.
  - Lille Metro (France) opens, with driverless trains.

=== May events ===
- May 6 - The last Georgia Railroad mixed train, the formerly-named Georgia Cannonball, is operated by the Seaboard System Railroad. Passenger service along the railroad's branch lines ceased a week prior.

=== June events ===
- June 20 - The Chicago and North Western Railway wins a bidding war against the Soo Line for control of the former Chicago, Rock Island & Pacific Railroad "Spine Line"; the Interstate Commerce Commission awarded the line to CNW's $93 million bid.
- June 23 – The San Francisco Historic Trolley Festival begins

=== July events ===
- July 3 - Chicago and North Western Railway holds official groundbreaking ceremonies for the construction of the line into Wyoming's Powder River Basin.
- July 16
  - The route of Amtrak's California Zephyr is shifted off the Union Pacific Railroad in Wyoming to the Denver and Rio Grande Western Railroad.
  - The entire Kowloon–Canton Railway (now East Rail line) between Kowloon (Hung Hom) and Lo Wu stations is electrified.

=== September events ===
- September 23 - In preparation for a sale of the Alaska Railroad's assets to the state of Alaska, the United States Railway Association sets the railroad's fair market value at $22.3 million.

=== October events ===
- October - The Shiranuka Line is abolished between Shiranuka Station and Hokushin Station in Hokkaido, Japan. This is the first line listed under the JNR Reconstruction Act to be abolished.
- October 1 - British Rail opens the Selby Diversion of East Coast Main Line between Doncaster, and York, a 22.8 km (14.2 mi) new line built to avoid speed restrictions as a result of potential subsidence induced by coal mining in the Selby area.
- October 17 - SEMTA discontinues its commuter rail service between Detroit and Pontiac, Michigan.
- October 29 - The last GG1 in revenue service pulls its last train, New Jersey Transit train number 3323.
- October 30
  - Amtrak launches a rebranded, thrice-weekly Auto Train using much of the same equipment and the same route as the train operated by Auto-Train Corporation.
  - Amtrak discontinues the commuter-oriented Chesapeake between Washington and Philadelphia.

=== December events ===
- December 18 - Canadian National Railway abandons track between Renfrew Junction and Whitney, Ontario on the company's Renfrew Subdivision.
- December 23 – The Toei Shinjuku Line is extended from Higashi-ojima to Funabori in Tokyo, Japan.

=== Unknown date events ===
- Benjamin Biaggini steps down as Chairman of the Board of Directors of the Southern Pacific Company, the parent company of the Southern Pacific Railroad.
- Boston and Maine Corporation is purchased by Guilford Transportation Industries.

== Accidents ==
- December 9 - The Wrawby Junction rail crash near Barnetby station in North Lincolnshire, England, killed one passenger.

== Deaths ==
- August 27 – Harry A. deButts, president of Southern Railway 1951–1962, dies.
