= David R. Goode =

American businessman

David R. Goode (born 1941, Vinton, Virginia) is the retired Chairman, President, and CEO of Norfolk Southern Corporation (holding company engaged principally in surface transportation). Other directorships: Caterpillar Inc.; Delta Air Lines, Inc.; Georgia-Pacific Corporation; Norfolk Southern Railway, and Texas Instruments Incorporated. He attended Duke University and Harvard Law School. He was chosen as the Railroader of the Year by industry trade journal Railway Age for 1998 and again in 2005.

The former Norfolk Southern regional office building in midtown Atlanta was named in his honor in 2005.

He is also known for ending the original steam program in 1994. In 2015, he admitted that it was a mistake.

Goode is a member of Augusta National Golf Club.

== Bibliography ==
- Hensley, Timothy B.; Miller, Kenneth L. (2021). Norfolk and Western Six-Eleven - 3 Times A Lady, Revised Edition (2nd ed.). Pocahontas Productions. ISBN 978-0-9899837-2-3.
- Wrinn, Jim (2000). Steam's Camelot: Southern and Norfolk Southern Excursions in Color (1st ed.). TLC Publishing. ISBN 1-883089-56-5.

Preceded by Paul M. Tellier (CN)	Railroader of the Year; 1998	Succeeded by Edward Burkhardt (WC)
Preceded by Robert J. Ritchie (CP)	Railroader of the Year; 2005	Succeeded by Richard F. Timmons (ASLRRA)
