= 1980 in rail transport =

This article lists events related to rail transport that occurred in 1980.

== Events ==
=== January ===
- January 7 – The Dunmurry train explosion takes place on board a Ballymena to Belfast passenger train service, when a Provisional Irish Republican Army (IRA) incendiary bomb explodes prematurely, killing three people.
- January 23 – Western Pacific Railroad president R. G. "Mike" Flannery announces that an agreement has been reached for the railroad to be controlled by Union Pacific Railroad.

=== February ===
- February 18 – Muni Metro is officially inaugurated in San Francisco, with weekday N Judah service in the Market Street subway. Other lines were transitioned from surface operations in stages until 1982.
- February 20 – Canadian Pacific Railway officially abandons its Eganville subdivision, including tracks between Payne and Douglas, Ontario.

=== March ===
- March 1 – The Milwaukee Road ends operations on all points west of Miles City, Montana, shutting down nearly half of the railroad.
- March 16 – The Toei Shinjuku Line is extended from Iwamotocho to Shinjuku in Tokyo, Japan, enabling through service onto the Keio Line.
- March 31 – The Chicago, Rock Island and Pacific Railroad (the Rock Island) ceases operations.

=== April ===
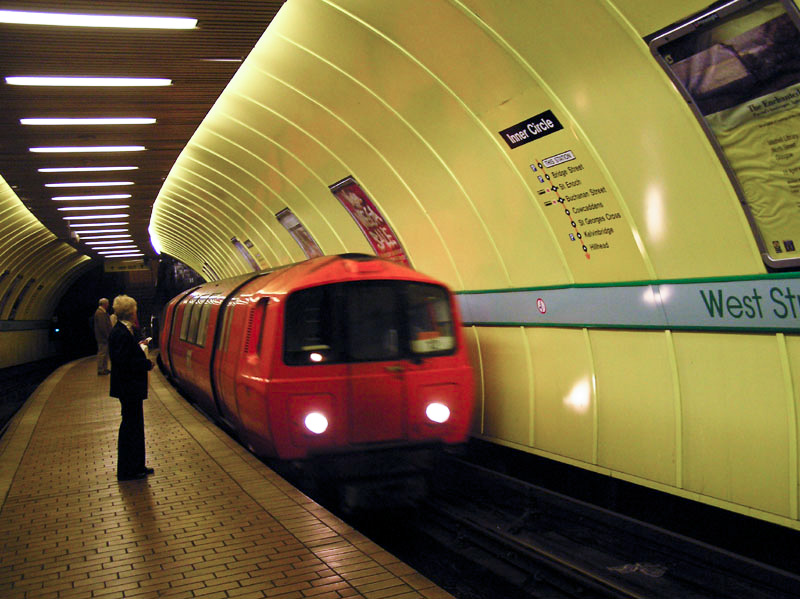
Glasgow Subway as rebuilt

- April 16 – After a complete system overhaul, the Glasgow Subway is reopened.

=== May ===
- May – Massachusetts Bay Transportation Authority extends passenger service to Concord, New Hampshire.
- May – The Interstate Commerce Commission approves the liquidation of the Rock Island Railroad; at 7,073 track miles covering 13 states, it is the largest such action in United States history.
- May 9 – The EMD AEM-7 electric locomotive enters revenue service with Amtrak.
- May 15 – John S. Reed of the Santa Fe and Benjamin Biaggini of the Southern Pacific issue a joint release announcing their intentions to merge the two railroads to form Southern Pacific Santa Fe Railroad.

=== June ===
- June 1
  - The Oslo Tunnel opens, connecting the eastern and western rail networks of Norway.
  - A new rail link opens between the city of Zürich and Zurich International Airport

=== July ===
- July 25 – Winsum train disaster, two trains collide on a single track between Groningen and Roodeschool, near Winsum, Netherlands, resulting in 9 deaths and 21 injured.
- July 31 – Boston and Maine Railroad, 2 men struck on track 16 inbound to Wakefield. Conductor Damian Soto is suspended 30 days without pay and forced to retake his conductor license.

=== August ===
- August 1 – Buttevant Rail Disaster in Ireland, a train derails en route from Dublin to Cork, killing 17 passengers.
- August 2 – Bologna bombing: a terrorist bomb explodes at Bologna Central Station in Italy, killing 85.
- August 3 – Amtrak introduces the Willamette Valley Express passenger train between Portland and Eugene, Oregon.
- August 11 – In England, the Tyne and Wear Metro opens for full public service with the first section from Haymarket to Tynemouth via South Gosforth and Four Lane Ends, the first British conversion from heavy to light rail.
- August 19 – The Otloczyn railway accident occurred near the village of Otłoczyn (Kuyavian-Pomeranian Voivodeship, northern Poland) which killed 67 people and injured 64 more.

=== October ===
- October 9 – Official opening of new standard gauge line from Tarcoola, South Australia to Alice Springs as part of the Adelaide–Darwin railway project.
- October 14 – U.S. President Jimmy Carter signs the Staggers Rail Act into law, significantly deregulating the American railroad industry.

=== November ===
- November 21 – The Burlington Northern Railroad acquires the St. Louis–San Francisco Railway.
- November – The Chessie System and Seaboard System Railroad merge to form CSX Transportation.
- November – The first test runs of the Joetsu Shinkansen between Tokyo and Niigata are operated.

=== December ===
- December 3 – The Northwestern Steel and Wire mill in Sterling, Illinois, operates a steam locomotive (Baldwin 0-8-0 #73) for the last time, the final commercial use in the United States.
- December – Promulgation of the JNR reconstruction act in a bid for the company to straighten out insolvency. As a result, 83 rural lines running in deficit were assigned to three phases of either a transfer to third-sector ownership or outright closure and replacement by bus services.

=== Unknown date ===
- Now owning a 98.34% control of the Cotton Belt Railroad, the Southern Pacific Railroad extends the Cotton Belt to Chicago, Illinois, through acquisition of the former Rock Island Railroad.
- The last train, controlled by Conrail, operates on New York City's former New York Central "High Line" on the West Side. It is reported to have hauled three boxcars of frozen poultry.
- L. Stanley Crane is succeeded by Harold H. Hall as president of the Southern Railway.
