= Georgia Midland Railroad =

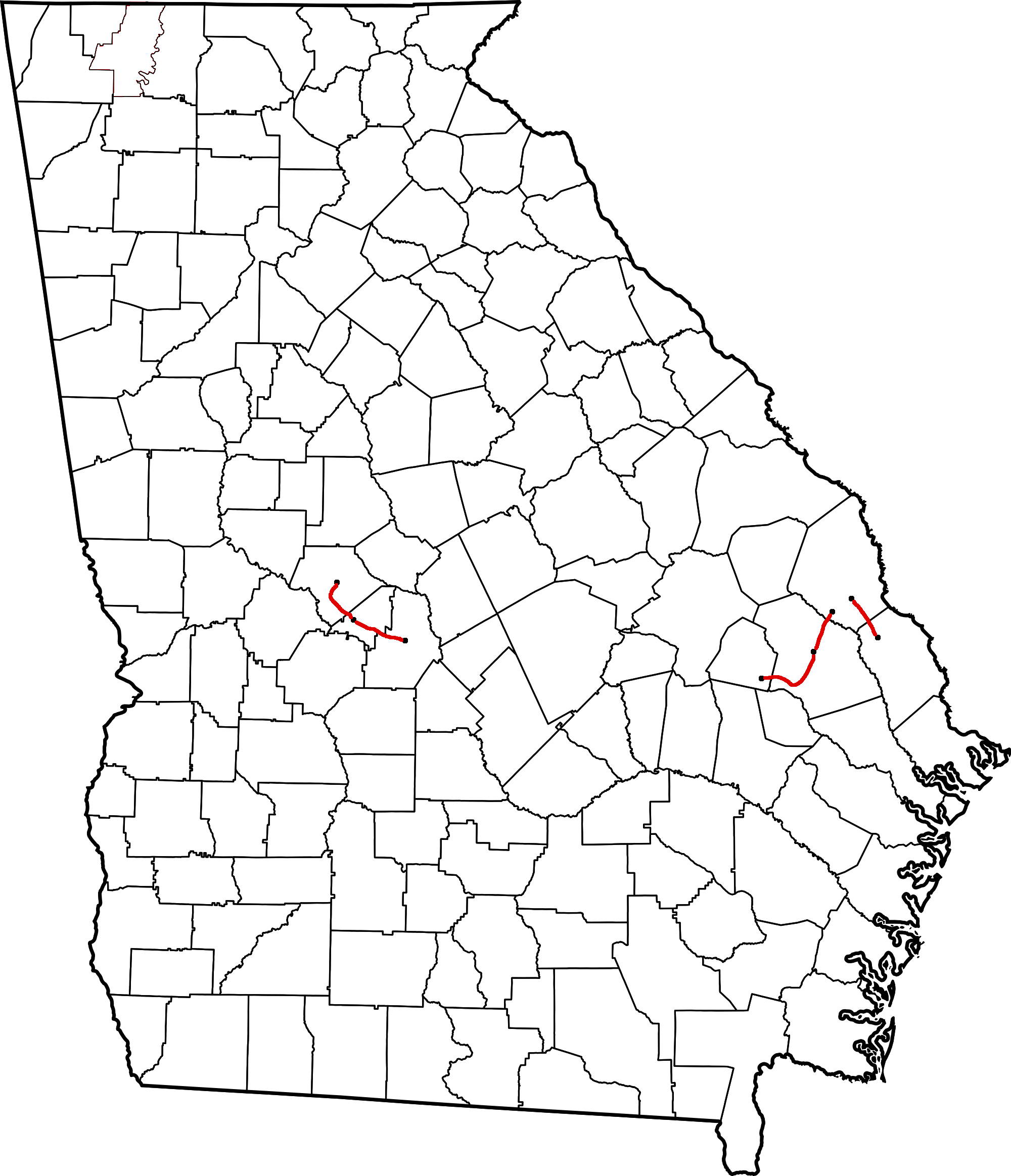
- Georgia Midland Railroad route map

Overview
- Headquarters: Americus, Georgia
- Reporting mark: GMR
- Locale: Georgia (U.S. state)
- Dates of operation: February 2004–December 2009

Technical
- Track gauge: 4 ft 8 1/2 in (1,435 mm) standard gauge

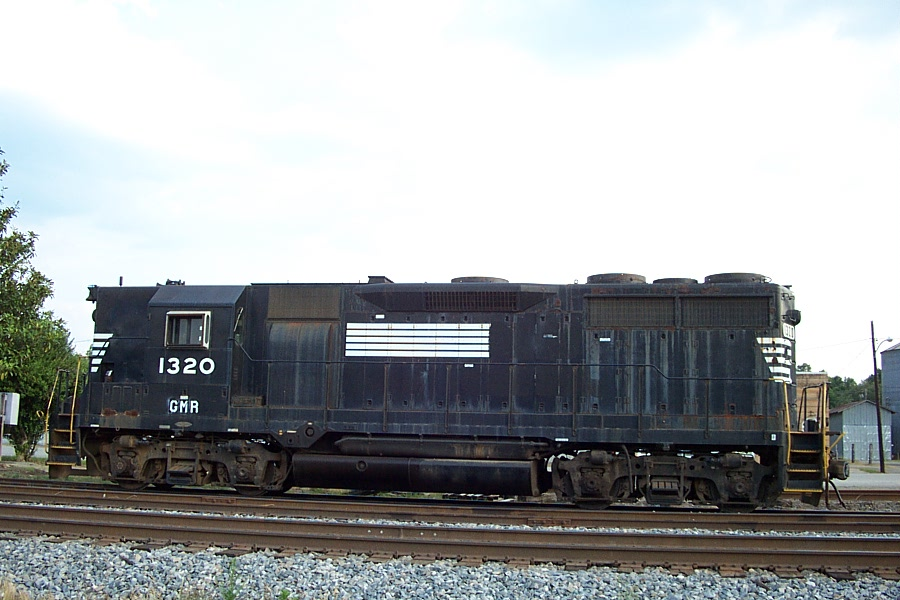
Georgia Midland Railroad GP35 1320 rests at Midville, Georgia during the summer of 2004

The Georgia Midland Railroad (reporting mark GMR) was a shortline railroad that operated several lines in Georgia that it acquired in 2004 from the initial operations of Ogeechee Railway. In 2009 the Georgia Midland was purchased by Pioneer RailCorp from Atlantic Western Transportation Company, the holding company for the Heart of Georgia Railroad. Pioneer renamed the railroad as the Georgia Southern Railway. Hauling an average of 5000 carloads per year of aggregate sand, stone, farm products and wood, the Georgia Midland Railroad connected with the Norfolk Southern Railway.

Initially the Georgia Midland operated three branch lines, all within Georgia, connecting Roberta through Fort Valley to Perry, Dover through Statesboro to Metter, and Ardmore to Sylvania. Subsequently the Ardmore-Sylvania line was returned to Ogeechee Railroad, which now operates it.

In 2006 the Georgia Midland was named Short Line Railroad of the Year by railroad industry trade journal Railway Age.

Preceded by Cedar Rapids and Iowa City Railway	Short Line Railroad of the Year; 2006	Succeeded by R.J. Corman Railroad/West Virginia Line
