= Jake Jacobson =

Lowell S. "Jake" Jacobson (1940-2021) served 29 years with the Union Pacific Railroad, later president and chief operating officer of the Copper Basin Railway of Hayden, Arizona.

Jacobson was named Railway Age's Railroader of the Year in 1994, and a Great Railroader of the Century in December 1999.

The American Shortline safety award is named after him: The Jake Award. Since 2000, the American Short Line and Regional Railroad Association has sponsored these awards.

Preceded by Raymond C. Burton, Jr. (TTX)	Railroader of the Year; 1994	Succeeded by Edward L. Moyers (SP)
