= Kindu rail accident =

2005 rail accident in the Democratic Republic of the Congo

Coordinates: 4.3044°S 26.0711°E

In the Kindu rail accident on November 29, 2005, at least 60 people were killed on the Kindu-Lubumbashi railway when they were swept off the roof of a train into the river below as the train crossed a bridge in the eastern Democratic Republic of Congo. After speaking with local officials in his region, Koloso Sumaili, the governor of Maniema province, says it seemed there were over 60 dead in this accident. He said the accident happened around 200 kilometres (120 mi) south of the town of Kindu, as the train travelled towards the southern town of Lubumbashi. "Trains that travel on that line have lots of people and goods on the roof. When the train was crossing over a bridge, the beams supporting the bridge swept people and goods off the train and into the river below," he said.

== See also ==
- List of rail accidents (2000–present)
