= 1979 in rail transport =

This article lists events related to rail transport that occurred in 1979.

== Events ==
=== January ===
- January – An electrical fire erupts aboard a Bay Area Rapid Transit (BART) train traveling in the transbay tube; the fire kills one firefighter and closes the system for more than two months.

=== February ===
- February 1 – The Southern Railway's Southern Crescent becomes Amtrak's Crescent as Southern discontinues independent passenger train service.
- February 10 – The Philippine National Railways opens its Dagupan Express service on the PNR North Main Line.
- February 26 – The Superliner railcar enters revenue service with Amtrak.

=== March ===
- March – Rio de Janeiro Metro in Brazil begins operation.
- March 17 – Penmanshiel Tunnel on British Rail collapses during reconstruction, killing two workers.

=== April ===
- April 16 – The Paisley Gilmour Street rail accident kills seven people in near Paisley Gilmour Street railway station in Scotland when an Inverclyde Line service from Glasgow Central to Wemyss Bay collided head-on with an Ayrshire Coast Line special service from Ayr. Seven people were killed.

=== May ===
- May 1 – The Jubilee line on the London Underground opens between Stanmore and Charing Cross.

=== June ===
- June 23 – New South Wales Premier Neville Wran officially opens the Eastern Suburbs Railway in Sydney. It operates as a shuttle between Central & Bondi Junction until full integration with the Illawarra Line during 1980.
- June 30 – MARTA's rail transit system opens in Atlanta, Georgia as its first train operates on the East Line between Avondale and Five Points Station. It also marks the start of MARTA's combined bus and rail service.

=== July ===
- July 1 – The former Nickey line junction with the Midland Main Line at Harpenden Junction is severed.

=== August ===
- August 20 – San Diego's Metropolitan Transit Development Board (MTDB) purchases the San Diego and Arizona Eastern Railway Company in restored condition for $18.1 million.
- August 20 – The East Coast Main Line rail route between England and Scotland is restored when the Penmanshiel Diversion opens.
- August 29 – Bangor and Aroostook Railroad discontinues hauling potatoes; it was for this business that the railroad painted many of their boxcars in a distinctive red, white and blue "State of Maine" livery.

=== September ===
- September 8 – Restored Nickel Plate 765 is unveiled.
- September 27 – The Lenk branch of the metre gauge Montreux–Oberland Bernois railway in Switzerland is reopened after a complete rebuilding.

=== October ===
- October 1
  - Hong Kong's first MTR line, the Kwun Tong line from Shek Kip Mei to Kwun Tong, is opened.
  - The permanent building at Amtrak's Dearborn, Michigan station opens.
- October 6, 8, and 9 – Amtrak discontinues the North Coast Hiawatha (October 6), Lone Star (October 8), and Floridian (October 9) passenger trains.
- October 22 – The Invergowrie rail crash, in Invergowrie, Scotland, occurs when a track signal fails to switch to a stop indication that would have protected a stalled passenger train; a second passenger train collides with the stalled train, resulting in 5 fatalities.
- October 28
  - Amtrak opens Buffalo–Depew station, replacing Buffalo Central Terminal.
  - Amtrak introduces double decker Superliner coaches on the Empire Builder passenger train.

=== November ===
- November 10 – 1979 Mississauga train derailment: A CP Rail train develops a hot box and derails 24 cars carrying hazardous materials near Mississauga, Ontario; almost 250,000 people are evacuated for up to five days at a time while cleanup commences.
- November 16
  - The first line of the Bucharest Metro, Line M1, opens from Timpuri Noi to Semănătoarea in Bucharest, Romania.
  - The ER200 begins test runs with passengers between Moscow and Leningrad, the first high-speed train in the Soviet Union, reaching 200 km/h.
- November 17 – The first stage of Brisbane Suburban Electrification between Ferny Grove and Darra is commissioned by the Queensland Premier Joh Bjelke-Petersen. It is the first section of electrification in Australia to use 25,000 volts 50 Hz overhead power supply.

=== December ===
- December 20 – The Tokyo Metro Chiyoda Line branch to Kita-Ayase station is opened.
- December – Union Pacific 3985, a 4-6-6-4 steam locomotive, is moved from static display in Cheyenne, Wyoming, for inspection and eventual restoration for operations.
- December – Nickel Plate 765, a 2-8-4 steam locomotive, operates under its own power after 21 years of static display.

=== Unknown date ===
- Alan Furth succeeds Denman McNear as president of the Southern Pacific Company, parent company of the Southern Pacific Railroad.
- The Federal Government of the United States relinquishes control of the Panama Railway, transferring the railway, alongside the Panama Canal Zone, to the government of Panama.

== Deaths ==
=== May deaths ===
- May 9 - Cyrus S. Eaton, president of the Chesapeake and Ohio Railway in the 1950s (b. 1883).
- May 16 - A. Philip Randolph, who organized the Brotherhood of Sleeping Car Porters in 1925 (b. 1889).
