= 2013 in rail transport =

This article lists events related to rail transport that occurred in 2013.

== Events ==
=== January ===
- (Netherlands) (Belgium) 18 January – Brand new V250-high speed EMU's taken out of Fyra-service definitely due to poor quality.
- (United States) 28 January – New Orleans Regional Transit Authority Loyola Avenue Streetcar Line opened.

=== February ===
- (Italy) 10 February – opening of Milan Metro Line 5.
- (United Kingdom) 11 February – Manchester Metrolink light rail system East Manchester Line opened to Droylsden.
- 24 February – The platforms at Togoshi-kōen Station, on the Tokyu Oimachi Line in Shinagawa, Tokyo, Japan, are extended from three car lengths to five.

=== March ===
- (Japan) 16 March – Shibuya Station of the Tokyu Toyoko Line move to an underground station from ground station, with direct commuter express trains beginning at Motomachi-Chūkagai of Yokohama heading to Hanno of the Seibu Ikebukuro Line or Kawagoeshi of the Tobu Tojo Line, via the Tokyo Metro Fukutoshin Line. Tokyu Toyoko Line ends serving Tokyo Metro Hibiya Line trains. However, Hibiya Line trains are still able to run more than 80 kilometres (50 mi) for one trip during through-train services.
- (France) 23 March – Paris Métro Line 4 is extended from Porte d'Orléans to Mairie de Montrouge.

=== April ===
- 14 April
  - (United States) – Utah Transit Authority's TRAX light rail Green Line extends service west from downtown Salt Lake City to the Salt Lake City International Airport.
  - (Japan) – Final service of the 200 series Shinkansen.
- 26 April
  - (South Korea) – The Yongin Everline driverless metro opens for service in southern Seoul.
  - (United States) – RTD's W-Line light rail corridor extends service west from Denver Union Station to Golden. This is the first FasTracks corridor to be completed.

=== May ===
- (United States) 10 May – Norfolk Southern announces the appointment of James A. Squires to become the railroad's new president effective 1 June.
- (United Kingdom) 26 May – National Express' Essex Thameside franchise, c2c expires; extended through 2014.
- (United States) 27 May – CapeFLYER summer weekend service from Boston, Massachusetts to Cape Cod begun.

=== July ===
- (China) 1 July – Opening of Hangzhou–Ningbo High-Speed Railway and Nanjing–Hangzhou Passenger Railway.
- (Canada) 6 July – Lac-Mégantic derailment: 47 people are killed in explosions and fire after an unattended train carrying Bakken formation crude oil runs away and derails in Lac-Mégantic, Quebec. It becomes the deadliest rail accident in Canadian history since 1864.
- 24 July – Santiago de Compostela derailment: 79 people are killed when an Alvia train derails at excessive speed on a curve in Galicia (Spain).

=== August ===
- (United States) 18 August – Utah Transit Authority's TRAX light rail Blue Line extends service further south from Sandy to Draper.

=== September ===
- (China) 15 September – Xi'an Metro Line 1 opened.
- (China) 26 September – Harbin Metro Line 1 opened.

=== October ===
- 15 October – The Kyushu Railway Company (Japan Railways Group) launches the 'Seven Stars in Kyushu' luxury sleeping car excursion train from Hakata Station with dedicated diesel locomotive haulage.
- (Turkey) 29 October – Completion of Marmaray suburban rail project in Istanbul with official opening of its Marmaray Tunnel under the Bosphorus, the first standard gauge rail connection between Europe and Asia.

=== November ===
- (Switzerland) 3 November – Standseilbahn Linth-Limmern funicular opens.

=== December ===
- (United States) 8 December – Utah Transit Authority's S Line (formerly known as Sugar House Streetcar) opens with service from South Salt Lake to the Sugar House neighborhood of Salt Lake City.
- (Singapore) 22 December – Downtown MRT line Phase 1 scheduled to open.
- 28 December – Opening of high speed Xiamen–Shenzhen Railway in southern China, fully completing the Hangzhou–Fuzhou–Shenzhen High-Speed Railway.
- (China) 28 December – Wuhan Metro Line 4 and Suzhou Metro Line 2, including Zhengzhou Metro has been opened.
- (China) 29 December – Shanghai Metro Lines 12 and 16 opened.

== Deaths ==
- 28 May – Isabel Benham, American railroad financial expert, dies (b. 1909).
- 23 August – Richard J. Corman, founder and owner of R.J. Corman Railroad Group, dies (b. 1955).

== Industry awards ==
=== Japan ===
Awards presented by the Japan Railfan Club

- 2013 Blue Ribbon Award: Tokyo Metro 1000 series EMU
