= 1988 in rail transport =

This article lists events related to rail transport that occurred in 1988.

== Events ==
=== January events ===
- January 6 - Michigan Central Station in Detroit closes to passengers.
- January 31 - Aichi Loop Line, Okazaki Station via Toyota-shi Station to Kozoji Station route officially completed in Aichi Prefecture, Japan.

=== February events ===
- February 1 - MBTA restores passenger train service to Rhode Island, but only during peak rush-hour times.
- February 29 - Illinois Central Gulf Railroad drops the word "Gulf" from its name, returning to the premerger Illinois Central Railroad company name.

=== March events ===
- March 13
  - Opening of the Seikan Tunnel beneath the Tsugaru Strait connecting the islands of Honshu and Hokkaido in Japan (53.85 km (33.46 mi)) as part of the Kaikyō Line of Hokkaido Railway Company, the world's longest (until 2016) and deepest.
  - Shin-Onomichi Station on the high-speed Sanyo Shinkansen line in Onomichi, Hiroshima, Japan, is opened.

=== May events ===
- May - Guilford Transportation Industries is established to operate railroads in the northeastern United States.
- May 29 - World's first Pendolino train to enter regular high-speed service, ETR 450 in Italy.

=== June events ===
- June 4 - The Arzamas train disaster occurs when three cars transporting hexogen to Kazakhstan explode on the railway crossing in Arzamas, Gorky Oblast of the Soviet Union, killing 91 people, injuring 1500 and destroying 151 buildings.
- June 8 – In Tokyo, Japan, the southern section of the Yurakucho Line is opened between Shintomicho and Shin-Kiba.
- June 12 - The Trondheim Tramway in Trondheim, Norway is closed, after decision in the city council.
- June 27 - A runaway train hits a stationary rush-hour train at Gare de Lyon in France, killing 59 people and injuring more than 50 others.

=== July events ===
- July 8 - Peruman railway accident: The Bangalore–Kanyakumari Island Express train derails on the Peruman bridge over Ashtamudi Lake, near Perinadu, Kollam, Kerala, India and falls into the lake, killing 105 people.
- July 26 - Israel's Knesset approves an amendment to the Ports Authority Law, merging Israel Railways into the Israel Port Authority, henceforth to be known as the Israel Ports and Railways Authority.

=== September events ===
- September 14 - The light rail system based in the Tuen Mun District of Hong Kong is opened for passenger service, with introductory free rides in the afternoon; normal, all-day service begins four days later.
- September 23 - Boston and Maine Railroad's former Connecticut River Line is transferred to Amtrak for the restoration of Montrealer service, which becomes Amtrak's Vermonter.
- September 29 - Union Station in Washington, D.C., is reopened after renovation.

=== October events ===
- October 13 - Rio Grande Industries, the parent company of the Denver and Rio Grande Western Railroad, purchases the Southern Pacific Railroad; the combined railroad takes SP's identity due to its brand status to shippers.

=== December events ===
- December 2 - The Toho Subway Line in Sapporo, Japan, opens for service between Sakaemachi Station and Hōsui-Susukino Station.
- December 11 - The New York City Metropolitan Transportation Authority opens the Archer Avenue Lines, and Jamaica – Van Wyck, Sutphin Boulevard, and Parsons/Archer subway stations, in Jamaica, Queens twenty years after it was proposed and five years after it was completed. This is part of a never-built subway extension reaching further into Queens.
- December 12 - Clapham Junction rail crash: Three British Rail commuter trains collide at around 8:00 AM (local time) at Clapham Junction in South East London as a result of inadequately supervised work on signalling, killing 35.

=== Unknown date events ===
- Burlington Northern Railroad corporate headquarters are moved from Seattle, Washington, to Fort Worth, Texas.
- The PNR North Main Line in the Philippines ceases all long-distance operations.
