= Robert J. Ritchie (railroad executive) =

Canadian businessman

Robert J. Ritchie is the former president and CEO of the Canada railway company, Canadian Pacific Railway.

In 1990 Ritchie succeeded Russell S. Allison as president of Canadian Pacific Railway, and in 1995 succeeded I. Barry Scott as CEO. In 1999 Ritchie supported the requisition and restoration of Canadian Pacific 2816, affectionately naming her "The Empress" in the process. In 2004 Ritchie was awarded the Railroader of the Year by Railway Age. Ritchie stood down as president and CEO of the company in May 2006 and was replaced by Fred Green (2006–2012). 2816 hauled a special retirement train in his honor.

In 2011, Ritchie was named to the board of directors of GATX corporation.

Ritchie is listed by Bloomberg LP as one of the Skyservice Investments board members.

Business positions
Preceded by David P. O'Brien	President of Canadian Pacific Railway; 2001 – 2006	Succeeded by Fred Green
Preceded by I. Barry Scott	CEO of Canadian Pacific Railway; 1995 – 2006	Succeeded by Fred Green
Awards and achievements
Preceded by Richard K. Davidson (UP)	Railroader of the Year; 2004	Succeeded by David R. Goode (NS)
