= Benjamin Biaggini =

American businessman

- Born: Benjamin Franklin Biaggini; April 15, 1916; New Orleans, Louisiana, USA
- Died: May 28, 2005 (aged 89); San Francisco, California, USA

Benjamin Franklin Biaggini (April 15, 1916 – May 28, 2005) was president of the Southern Pacific Company, parent company of Southern Pacific Railroad, from 1964 to 1976 and chairman of the Board of Directors from 1976 to 1983.

Preceded by Donald J. Russell (1964-1972)	Chairman of the Southern Pacific Railroad Board of Directors; 1976 – 1983	Succeeded by nobody
