= Train Operator of the Year =

British rail transport industry award

Train Operator of the Year is a rail transport industry award to recognise excellence among train operating companies of the United Kingdom. The award has been presented as part of the Rail Business Awards since 1997.

Greater Anglia and Chiltern Railway have both won the award three times. East Anglian railways (including Greater Anglia, Abellio Greater Anglia and Anglia Railways) have won the award a record seven times.

A similarly named award is also presented by the Rail Delivery Group as part of that organisation's National Cycle-Rail Awards to recognise work in encouraging the use of bicycles and trains as a commuting solution.

== Winners ==
Year	Winner	Runner-up / Highly Commended	Ref
1999	Midland Mainline		
2000	Anglia Railways		
2001	Chiltern Railways		
2002	Chiltern Railways		
2003	Anglia Railways		
2004	London Underground		
2005	Eurostar		
2006	Freightliner		
2007	Virgin Trains West Coast		
2008	Northern Rail		
2009	First Great Western		
2010	Northern Rail		
2011	South West Trains		
2012	First TransPennine Express		
2013	Abellio Greater Anglia		
2014	Merseyrail		
2015	London Underground		
2016	London Overground Rail Operations		
2017	Chiltern Railways		
2018	KeolisAmey Docklands		
2019	Abellio Greater Anglia		
2020	Greater Anglia		
2021	Greater Anglia		
2022	TransPennine Express	Greater Anglia	
2023	KeolisAmey Docklands	Greater Anglia	
2024	MTR Elizabeth Line	Greater Anglia (Highly Commended)	
2025	Greater Anglia	West Midlands Trains (Highly Commended)	
2026	London Northwestern & West Midlands Railways		

== See also ==
- Regional Railroad of the Year and Short Line Railroad of the Year for comparable awards in the United States.
