= Railway Age =

US trade magazine for the rail industry

- May 2008 issue
- Editor: William C. Vantuono
- Categories: Trade magazine
- Frequency: Monthly
- Publisher: Simmons-Boardman Publishing Corporation
- First issue: 1856
- Country: United States
- Based in: Chicago
- Language: English
- Website: www.railwayage.com
- ISSN: 0033-8826
- OCLC: 6973348

Railway Age is an American trade magazine for the rail transport industry. It was founded in 1856 in Chicago (the United States' major railroad hub) and is published monthly by Simmons-Boardman Publishing Corporation.

== History ==
The magazine's original title was the Western Railroad Gazette, and it was renamed the Railroad Gazette in 1870. In June 1908, after purchasing its chief rival, The Railway Age (founded in 1876 in Chicago), it changed its title to Railroad Age Gazette, then in January 1910, to Railway Age Gazette. In 1918, it shortened its name to the current title. Railway Review (originally the Chicago Railway Review) was merged into Railway Age in 1927.

Publications that have been merged into Railway Age include American Railroad Journal, founded in 1832, renamed The Railroad and Engineering Journal in 1887 by its then-new owner/editor, Matthias N. Forney. It became American Engineer & Railroad Journal in 1883, then Railway Age Gazette, Mechanical Edition in June 1913 after its acquisition by Simmons-Boardman Publishing. It was renamed Railway Mechanical Engineer in 1916, and then Railway Locomotives & Cars. It was finally folded into Railway Age in 1975. In 1992, Railway Age acquired a competing trade publication, Modern Railroads (ISSN 0736-2064). Samuel O. Dunn was the magazine's editor-in-chief for 37 years, from 1911 to 1948.

== Awards ==
Railway Age presents the Short Line Railroad of the Year, an annual award presented to North American short line (Class III) railroads, and the Regional Railroad of the Year, an annual award presented to North American regional railroads.

Past recipients of the Short Line Railroad of the Year award include:

Short Line Railroad of the Year
  - 1992 - RailTex
  - 1994 - Central Vermont Railroad (CV)
  - 1995 - New England Central Railroad (NECR)
  - 1996 - Philadelphia, Bethlehem and New England Railroad (PBNE)
  - 1997 - Livonia, Avon and Lakeville Railroad (LAL)
  - 1998 - St. Lawrence and Atlantic Railroad (SLA)
  - 1999 - South Central Florida Express (SCFE)
  - 2000 - Arkansas Midland Railroad (AKMD)
  - 2001 - South Buffalo Railway (SBR)
  - 2002 - Winchester and Western Railroad (WW)
  - 2003 - San Joaquin Valley Railroad (SJVR)
  - 2004 - Nittany and Bald Eagle Railroad (NBER)
  - 2005 - Cedar Rapids and Iowa City Railway (CIC)
  - 2006 - Georgia Midland Railroad (GMA)
  - 2007 - R.J. Corman Railroad/West Virginia Line
  - 2008 - Twin Cities and Western Railroad
  - 2009 - Pacific Harbor Line, Inc.
  - 2010 - Greenville and Western Railway (GRLW)
  - 2011 - Blacklands Railroad
  - 2012 - Vermont Railway (VTR)
  - 2013 - Gardendale Railroad
  - 2014 - Coos Bay Rail Link
  - 2015 - Palmetto Railways
  - 2016 - New Orleans & Gulf Coast Railway
  - 2017 - North Shore Railroad (NSHR)
  - 2018 - Lake State Railway
  - 2019 - Louisville & Indiana Railroad
  - 2020 - Terminal Railroad Association of St. Louis
  - 2021 - R.J. Corman Railroad/Memphis Line
  - 2022 - Vermont Railway (VTR)
  - 2023 - Napoleon, Defiance & Western Railroad
    - 2023 short line honorable mention - Aberdeen, Carolina and Western Railway
  - 2024 - Mississippi Export Railroad
    - 2024 short line honorable mention: Eastern Idaho Railroad
  - 2025 - Rochester & Erie Railway (RERY)
    - 2025 short line honorable mentions: Central Montana Rail, Columbus & Ohio River Rail Road, Great Sandhills Railway, R.J. Corman Railroad Company West Virginia Line

Past recipients of the Regional Railroad of the Year award include:

Regional Railroad of the Year
  - 1992 – Wisconsin Central Ltd.
  - 1995 – New England Central Railroad
  - 1996 – Bangor and Aroostook Railroad
  - 1997 – Red River Valley and Western Railroad
  - 1998 – Texas Mexican Railway
  - 1999 – Providence and Worcester Railroad
  - 2000 – Bessemer and Lake Erie Railroad
  - 2001 – Wisconsin and Southern Railroad
  - 2002 – Reading Blue Mountain and Northern Railroad
  - 2003 – Indiana Harbor Belt Railroad
  - 2004 – Wheeling and Lake Erie Railway
  - 2005 – Red River Valley and Western Railroad
  - 2006 – Buffalo and Pittsburgh Railroad
  - 2007 – Florida East Coast Railway
  - 2008 – South Kansas and Oklahoma Railroad
  - 2009 – Wisconsin and Southern Railroad
  - 2010 – Northern Plains Railroad
  - 2011 - Reading Blue Mountain and Northern Railroad
  - 2012 - Indiana Rail Road
  - 2013 - Montana Rail Link
  - 2014 - Arkansas and Missouri Railroad
  - 2015 - Reading Blue Mountain and Northern Railroad
  - 2016 - Central Maine & Quebec Railway
  - 2017 - Conrail
  - 2018 - Indiana Rail Road
  - 2019 - Rapid City, Pierre & Eastern Rail Road
  - 2020 - Reading Blue Mountain and Northern Railroad
  - 2021 - Lake State Railway
  - 2022 - South Kansas and Oklahoma Railroad
  - 2023 - ArcelorMittal Infrastructure Canada (AMIC) Railway
  - 2024 - Wheeling & Lake Erie Railway
  - 2025 - Iowa Interstate Railroad

== See also ==
- List of railroad-related periodicals
