= List of presidents of the Canadian Pacific Railway Limited =

The heads and corporate officers of the Canadian Pacific Railway.

== Presidents ==
List of CPR presidents since 1881:

- 1881-1888 Sir George Stephen, 1st Baron Mount Stephen Bt. GCVO
- 1889-1899 Sir William Cornelius Van Horne KCMG
- 1899-1918 Sir Thomas George Shaughnessy, 1st Baron Shaughnessy KCVO
- 1918-1942 Sir Edward Wentworth Beatty GBE
- 1942-1947 D'Alton Corry Coleman CMG
- 1947-1948 William Merton Neal
- 1948-1955 William Allan Mather KGStJ
- 1955–1964, 1966 Norris Roy Crump CC
- 1964-1966 Robert A. Emerson
- 1966-1972 Ian David Sinclair OC
- 1972-1981 Frederick Stewart Burbidge OC
- 1981-1984 William W. Stinson
- 1984-1990 Russel S. Allison
- 1990-2001 David P. O'Brien OC
- 2001-2006 Robert J. Ritchie
- 2006-2012 Frederic J. Green
- 2013–Present Keith Creel

== Chief Executive Officer of CPR ==
Before 2017 the CEO was a separate title and thereafter held by the president of the company.

- Keith Creel 2017 - Present
- E. Hunter Harrison 2012-2017
- Frederic J. Green 2006-2012
- Robert J. Ritchie 1995-2006
- Ian Barry Scott 1985-1995
