= William Stinson =

William Stinson is the name of:

- K. William Stinson (1930–2002), American politician from Washington
- William W. Stinson (1933–2026), Canadian railroad executive
- William G. Stinson (born 1945), American politician from Pennsylvania
