= Steve Tobias =

American businessman

- Born: Stephen Craig Tobias
- Died: August 7, 2017 (age 72)
- Education: The Citadel
- Occupation: Railroad executive
- Known for: Chief operating officer of Norfolk Southern Railway

Stephen Craig Tobias was an American businessman. He was chief operating officer of Norfolk Southern Railway, and a director of Canadian Pacific Railway.

== Life ==
Tobias, a US Army veteran, joined Norfolk Southern in 1969 as a junior engineer, and served as Chief Operating Officer from 1998 to 2009, when he retired.

In 2012, he joined the Board of Directors of Canadian Pacific, and served briefly as CEO. He stepped down from the board in 2015 for personal reasons.

Tobias died August 7, 2017.

Business positions
Preceded by	Interim CEO of Canadian Pacific Railway; 2012	Succeeded by E. Hunter Harrison
Awards
Preceded by Bill Wimmer	Railroader of the Year; 2008	Succeeded by Michael J. Ward
