= Paul Hilal =

American businessman and investor

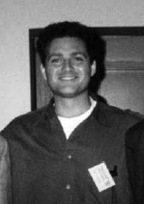
- Born: Paul Charles Hilal
- Education: Harvard University (SB); Columbia University (JD, MBA)
- Occupations: Founder and CEO of Mantle Ridge LP
- Years active: 1992–present
- Known for: Mantle Ridge; Air Products; Aramark; Dollar Tree, Inc; Canadian Pacific Railway; CSX Transportation; Pershing Square Capital Management
- Father: Sadek Hilal

Paul Charles Hilal is an American businessman and investor. He is the CEO of Mantle Ridge LP, which he founded in January 2016.

== Early life and education ==
Hilal is one of four children born to Sadek Hilal, a professor of radiology at the University of Columbia, and his wife, Cynthia, a schoolteacher and guidance counselor. He graduated from Harvard College in 1988 with a degree in Biochemistry. In 1992, he received his J.D. from Columbia University School of Law and an M.B.A. from Columbia University School of Business.

== Career ==
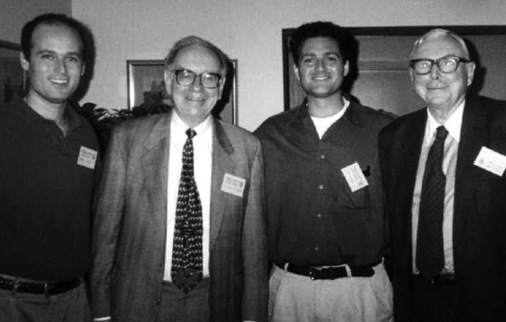
Left to right: Peter Hilal, Warren Buffett, Paul Hilal and Charlie Munger.

Hilal started his career in 1992 as an investment banker at Broadview Associates. In 1998, he moved on to Hilal Capital Management to run the information technology sector investment program. Concurrently, he served as the interim CEO of Worldtalk Communications and led the company through acquisition by the Tumbleweed Communications Corp in 1999.

He then launched Caliber Capital Management in 2002.

Hilal joined Pershing Square Capital Management in 2006, where he worked for a decade. During his time at Pershing Square, he worked on the firm’s activist investments in Ceridian, Air Products & Chemicals and Canadian Pacific Railway, and he served on Ceridian's board until the sale of the company to private equity firm Thomas H. Lee Partners in 2007.

Hilal also persuaded E. Hunter Harrison to come out of retirement to become CEO of the Canadian Pacific Railway, and in January 2013 initiated the recruitment of an executive Keith Creel, then COO of rival railroad Canadian National, to the COO post of Canadian Pacific (CP). Reportedly, Pershing Square netted over $2 billion in profits from its investment in CP. Hilal served as a Director of Canadian Pacific until his retirement from Pershing Square in January 2016.

=== Mantle Ridge LP ===
In 2016, Hilal started Mantle Ridge, a New York-based investment fund with a current AUM of more than $2 billion.

In January 2017, Paul Hilal led an effort to install former Canadian Pacific CEO E. Hunter Harrison as CEO of CSX Transportation after buying Harrison out of his contract with Canadian Pacific for nearly CA$100 million. In March 2017, CSX announced that Hunter Harrison was appointed CEO of CSX, and a restructuring that added four new independent directors to the CSX board, including Hilal as Vice Chairman. On December 16, 2017, Harrison died. The 2018 biography of Hunter Harrison, Railroader, describes Paul Hilal as having devoted substantial time into researching Canadian Pacific before the Mantle Ridge investment.

In 2019, Hilal’s second campaign at Mantle Ridge focused on leadership change at food services provider Aramark. Under the terms of a settlement, the campaign resulted in the installation of a new CEO, appointment of Hilal as Vice Chairman, and replacement of six independent directors on Aramark’s Board.

In November 2021, it was reported that Mantle Ridge had amassed a $1.8 billion stake in Dollar Tree, Inc., seeking to bring in new leadership, including Richard Dreiling, the former CEO of Dollar General. Subsequently, in March 2022 the company announced that Dreiling had been appointed CEO and Hilal was appointed Vice Chairman of the board.

== Personal life ==
Hilal serves on the Board of the Columbia University School of Business. He also served on the board of directors of the Grameen Foundation until 2016.
