= Buck Crump =

Canadian businessman (1904–1989)

Norris Roy ("Buck") Crump
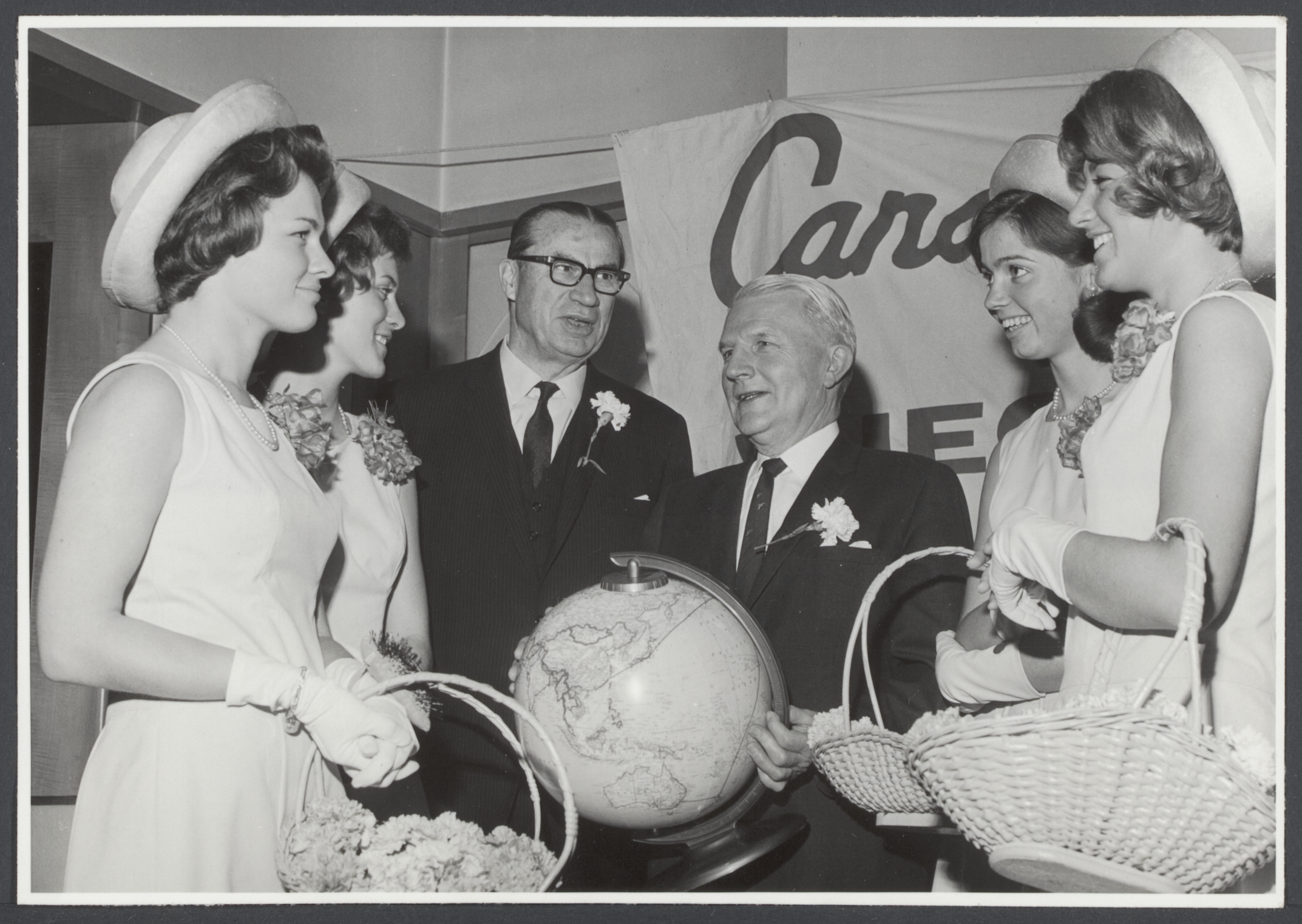
- Crump (centre right) in Amsterdam (1966)
- Born: July 30, 1904; Revelstoke, British Columbia, Canada
- Died: December 26, 1989 (aged 85); Calgary, Alberta, Canada
- Known for: President of Canadian Pacific Railway Limited
- Awards: Order of Canada

Norris Roy ("Buck") Crump, CC (July 30, 1904 – December 26, 1989) was a Canadian businessman, who was chairman and president of the Canadian Pacific Railway (CPR). He was primarily responsible for converting the railroad to diesel locomotives, and expanded the company into non-transportation sectors.

== Early life and education ==
Crump was born in Revelstoke, British Columbia. His father was a railway superintendent. Crump joined the CPR as an apprentice machinist in 1920, when he was sixteen years old. In between working for the railway, he earned a bachelors and in 1936 a master's degree at Purdue University.

== Career ==
After working as a track labourer and then in the machine shop, Crump was transferred to Winnipeg, where he continued to work while completing high school at night. After time off to complete a university degree, he took a position as a night foreman. He was transferred to Montreal as an assistant to the vice president, and in 1943 became superintendent of the Ontario district. In 1948 Crump was a vice president at CPR; to counter lower numbers of passengers, he advocated increasing advertising and spending more money to make train travel attractive.

Crump was elected president in 1955; the company was severely in debt at the time. At the time the company was mainly using diesel locomotives only in the railyards; during the following twelve years, Crump oversaw the dieselisation of the railroad. He ordered the purchase of new equipment to commence operation of a new trans-continental train The Canadian which began operation in April 1955.

To improve profit margins Crump initiated a reorganization and expansion of the company's non-rail business.

An admirer of Samuel de Champlain, founder of Quebec City and New France, it was Crump who proposed naming the company's Montreal hotel Château Champlain after him.

In 1971 he was made a Companion of the Order of Canada and in 1974 Crump retired.

== Notes ==
Business positions
Preceded by William A. Mather	President of Canadian Pacific Railway Limited; 1955 – 1964	Succeeded by Robert A. "Bob" Emerson
Preceded by Robert A. "Bob" Emerson	President of Canadian Pacific Railway Limited; 1966	Succeeded by Ian David Sinclair
