= 2016 Union Pacific oil train fire =

US oil train derailment and fire

Mosier Oregon oil car derailment
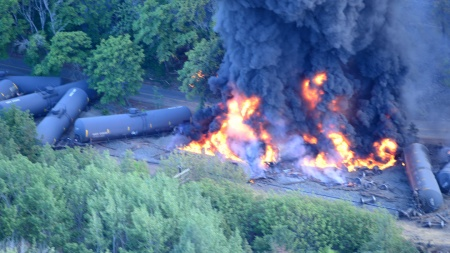
- Rail cars burning

Details
- Date: June 3, 2016; 12:00 PST (19:00 GMT)
- Location: Mosier, Oregon
- Coordinates: 45.6847006°N 121.4034557°W
- Country: United States
- Incident type: Derailment

Statistics
- Trains: 1
- Damage: 15 tank cars derailed, several caught fire

On June 3, 2016, a Union Pacific train with 96 tank cars carrying Bakken oil from New Town, North Dakota to U.S. Oil and Refining in Tacoma, Washington derailed in the Columbia River Gorge near Mosier, Oregon. Sixteen of the 96 cars derailed after the train's emergency brake system about 18 cars back from the engines engaged – several cars then caught fire. By 5pm large explosions were coming from the tankers. All of the crude oil carrying tank cars were CPC-1232 design, a second-generation standard superseded in 2015 by the DOT-117 requirements, although enforcement had been delayed to May, 2025. Interstate 84 in Oregon was closed, with Washington State Route 14 being recommended as a detour.

Washington Department of Ecology, US Coast Guard, Federal Railroad Administration, and Portland Airport's specialty airport fire tender carrying 1,300 U.S. gallons (4,900 L) of firefighting foam were among the 20 agencies that responded. As of 4:30pm firefighters were allowing the fire to burn the oil, simply monitoring it.

Mosier residents were evacuated and the sewage treatment plant was shut down. An oil sheen was seen on the Columbia River by the following morning. Two days after the crash residents were allowed to return to their homes, and freight trains were running on the tracks, to the strong objection of the community. The community then passed an emergency motion asking Union Pacific to remove all oil from the damaged cars before resuming the use of the tracks. Union Pacific pushed the damaged cars out of the way and limited the train speed to 10 miles per hour (16 km/h) in the section.

42,000 US gallons (160,000 L) of oil were spilled. Much of it was consumed by fire, some went into the Columbia River, and 10,000 US gallons (38,000 L) were recovered from the city's sewage treatment plant.

== Non-investigation controversy ==
The National Transportation Safety Board declined to investigate due to the lack of injuries or fatalities and early information gathered after the incident occurred indicated there was not a significant safety issue.

In response to the derailment and lack of investigation by the National Transportation Safety Board, Oregon Senators Jeff Merkley and Ron Wyden introduced the Mandate Oil Spill Inspections and Emergency Rules (Mosier) Act which calls for a moratorium on oil train traffic after major wrecks and require the Department of Transportation to reduce the amount of volatile gases in the crude oil those trains have been hauling. The bill would die in committee.

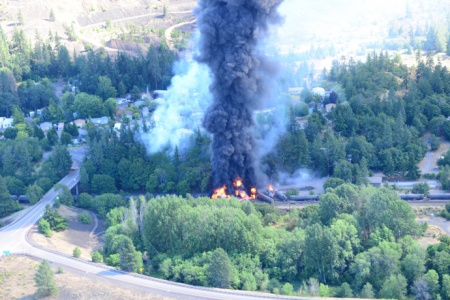
Derailed and burning oil cars

Coast Guard aircrew aboard an MH-60 Jayhawk helicopter conducts an overflight near the scene of a train derailment

== See also ==
- 2015 Mount Carbon train derailment
- Media related to 2016 Union Pacific oil train fire at Wikimedia Commons
