= 2015 Mount Carbon train derailment =

2015 West Virginia derailment

Mount Carbon CSX Derailment
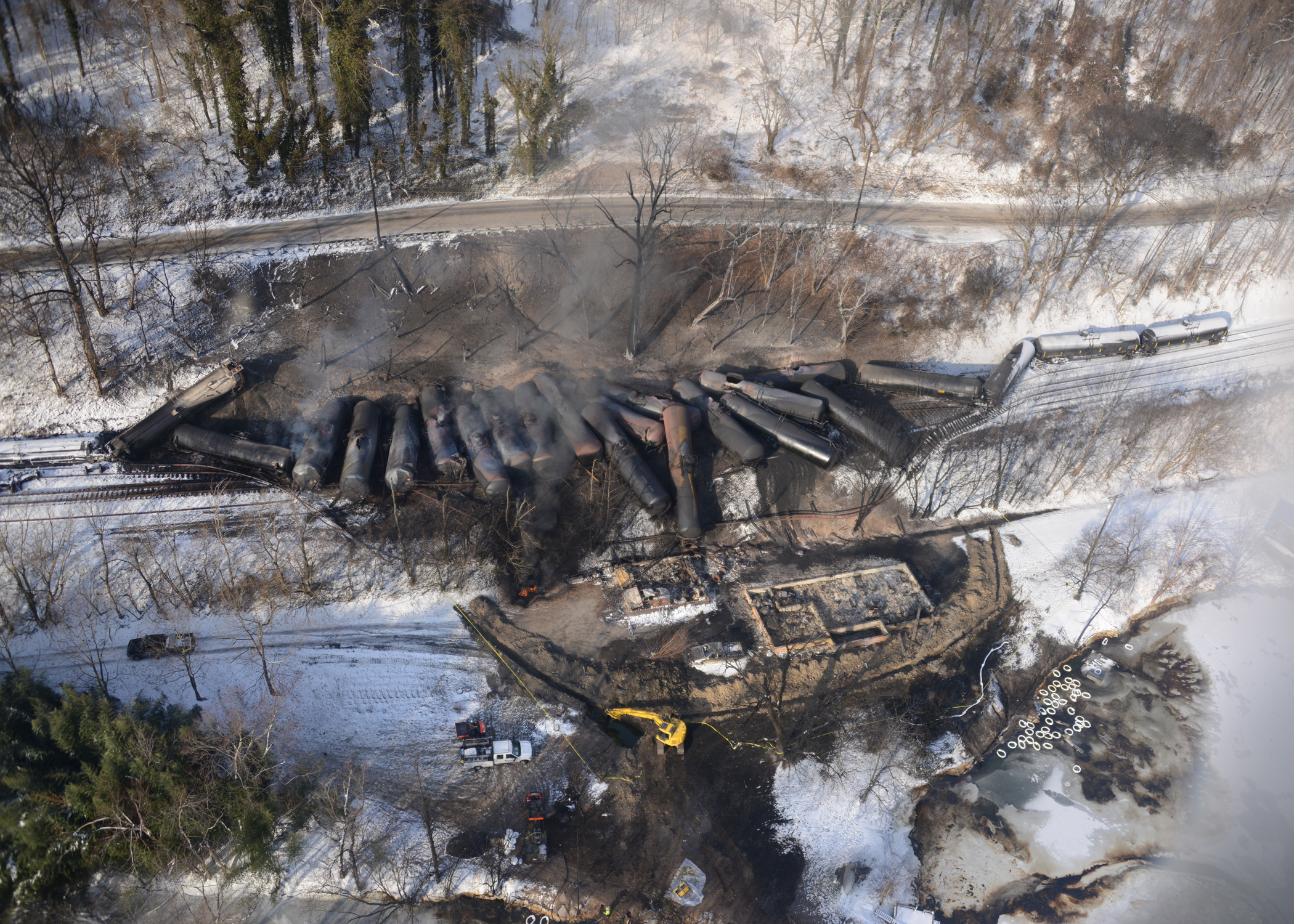
- The accident site on February 18, 2015.

Details
- Date: February 16, 2015; 11 years ago 13:15 EST (18:15 GMT)
- Location: Mount Carbon, West Virginia
- Coordinates: 38°8′55.38″N 81°17′34.07″W
- Country: United States
- Line: CSX Huntington Division, New River Subdivision
- Operator: CSX Transportation
- Incident type: Derailment
- Cause: Broken Rail

Statistics
- Trains: 1
- Injured: 1
- Damage: Large fire, 24 tank cars, One home destroyed, release of 378,000 gallons of crude oil

The 2015 Mount Carbon train derailment refers to a derailment in Mount Carbon, West Virginia, on February 16, 2015, which involved a CSX Transportation train hauling 107 tank cars of crude oil from North Dakota to Virginia. It resulted in a large oil spill that caught fire with several subsequent large, violent eruptions. The spill, fire, and eruptions destroyed one home, forced the evacuation of hundreds of families and caused the temporary shut down of two nearby water treatment plants. Eventually, 19 railcars carrying crude oil caught fire with each car carrying up to 30,000 US gallons (110,000 L; 25,000 imp gal) of crude oil.

== Background ==
The train was composed of two GEVO locomotives, a covered hopper car acting as a buffer car, 107 tank cars, and a single trailing end buffer car, with a total of 109 cars. The train was carrying volatile Bakken crude, from North Dakota's shale fields at Manitou, North Dakota, to an oil shipping depot in Yorktown, Virginia. All of the cars were DOT-111 tank cars meeting the Casualty Prevention Circular (CPC)-1232 industry standard. These so-called CPC-1232's were introduced by the rail industry in 2011 to increase the safety of carrying flammable liquids. However, several accidents involving the cars have brought their effectiveness into doubt.

== Accident ==
At the time of the accident, the train was being led by CREX ES44AC #1349 and CSX Transportation ES40DC #5243 was traveling through Mount Carbon, West Virginia, in an area of town known as Adena Village, across the river from Boomer Bottom. The state was under a winter storm warning and getting heavy snowfall at times, with as much as 5 inches (130 mm) in some places. At the time, it was unclear whether the snow contributed to the crash. West Virginia Governor Earl Ray Tomblin's spokesman Chris Stadelman stated that 26 cars left the tracks, 19 of which caught fire. A portion of the train hit and completely destroyed a house, and initial reports stated another rail car ran into the nearby river (it was later found that no cars went into the river), prompting the closure of nearby water treatment plants. Some tank fires were still burning the following morning, but federal investigators were allowed to get within 150 feet (46 m) of the derailed cars, and Appalachian Power crews were able to repair a line and restore electricity to about 900 customers. During the emergency response, authorities closed the adjacent West Virginia Route 61 in the area of the accident. One lane of the highway was subsequently reopened to most residents, allowing them to return home.

An investigation by federal authorities, using data found on the train's digital data recorders, revealed the train was traveling at 33 miles per hour (53 km/h) at the time of the accident. The legal speed for the section of railroad track where the accident occurred is 50 miles per hour (80 km/h), eliminating illegal speed as a factor in the derailment. Oil spilled into a creek near the accident site, but tests have not found the areas potable water supply to be contaminated by the crude oil that leaked.

The weather at the time of the accident was 15 °F (−9 °C) with 8 inches (200 mm) of recent snow. The train was traveling at 33 miles per hour (53 km/h), below the 50-mile-per-hour (80 km/h) speed limit for the area and a 40-mile-per-hour (64 km/h) speed restriction imposed by CSX due to cold weather. The second car in the train (the first tanker car behind the buffer car), through the 28th car derailed. Shortly after the derailment occurred, the train went into emergency braking as a result of the brake line coming apart. The engines traveled 636 feet (194 m) after this. The train crew must have seen the damage behind them and moved the engines and the buffer car an additional 999 feet (304 m) away from the accident.

The second car in the train (the first tanker car behind the buffer car), through the 28th car derailed. The first five of these cars, position 2 to 6 turned over on their sides. The next 18 cars at position 7 to 24 piled up in a tight accordion style, while the last four cars that derailed at position 25 to 28 were somewhat in line. Cars 7 to 25 released their oil. Only two of the cars were punctured, four leaked due to valve or fitting damage. The remaining 13 suffered from thermal tears. These thermal tears were likely the cause of the violent fireball eruptions.

The first fireball occurred 25 minutes after the derailment with the 13th and last fireball happening more than ten hours later. The fire burned for four days, finally burning out on February 20.

== Aftermath ==
One person was treated for potential inhalation according to CSX. As of February 17, the West Virginia National Guard took water samples to determine whether oil seeped into Armstrong Creek and CSX contractors also monitored the air for pollution linked to the fires. Federal railroad and hazardous materials officials are currently probing the accident, and Governor Tomblin declared a state of emergency.

Immediately following the accident, the various emergency response agencies organized The Unified Command for the West Virginia Train Derailment (UCWVTD), as a central command. The UCWVTD ordered evacuations of the Mount Carbon areas most at risk from the fires; specifically Adena Village, and Boomer Bottom. As the situation improved in the days that followed, most residents were allowed to return home.

== Investigations ==
The U.S. Federal Railroad Administration was the lead agency in the investigation of the accident. The U.S. National Transportation Safety Board contributed with a detailed analysis of the tank car performance.

The cause of the derailment was determined to be a broken rail. Specifically, it was a failure known as a vertical split head (VSH), where the top of the rail is split lengthwise. Specialized rail inspections in this area are performed by CSX's contractor, Sperry Rail Service, using internal rail flaw detector cars. Inspections on December 17, 2014 (61 days before) and January 12, 2015 (35 days before) had revealed a defect at the point where the rail later broke. However, in both cases, the inspector did not perform a detailed inspection by hand as required. The inspector told investigators that he thought the indications from his instruments were simply caused by rough rail surface conditions. It was also revealed that the inspector had been working on the CSX territory for fifteen years but had not been given the enhanced training that a new employee would have been given.
