= Crex (disambiguation) =

Crex refers to a monotypic genus of birds in the rail family, the corn crake.

- Crex Meadows, a wildlife park in the United States
- CREX, a trading name of Citicorp Railmark Inc. (Citirail)
