= CSX Transportation =

Class I railroad system in the United States

- A map of CSX Transportation's train routes with trackage rights in purple, as of 2009

- CSX 3190, a GE ES44AC, hauls an Intermodal through Blue Island, Illinois

Overview
- Headquarters: CSX Transportation Building, 500 Water Street, Jacksonville, Florida, US
- Key people: Steve Angel (President and CEO); Mike Cory (Executive Vice President and COO); Kevin Boone (Executive Vice President and Chief Commercial Officer); Stephen Fortune (Executive Vice President and Chief Digital and Technology Officer); Sean Pelkey (Executive Vice President and CFO); Diana Sorfleet (Executive Vice President and Chief Administrative Officer); Michael Burns (Senior Vice President, Chief Legal Officer, and Corporate Secretary)
- Reporting mark: CSXT
- Locale: Northeastern, Southern, Midwestern United States and Eastern Canada
- Dates of operation: July 1, 1986–present
- Predecessors: List: Chessie System; Seaboard System Railroad; Baltimore and Ohio Railroad; Chesapeake and Ohio Railway; Western Maryland Railway; Richmond, Fredericksburg and Potomac Railroad; Pittsburgh and Lake Erie Railroad; Georgia Railroad and Banking Company; Conrail; Pan Am Railways

Technical
- Track gauge: 4 ft 8 1/2 in (1,435 mm) standard gauge
- Length: 21,000 miles (34,000 km)

Other
- Website: www.csx.com

CSX Transportation (reporting mark CSXT), known colloquially as simply CSX, is a Class I freight railroad company operating in the Eastern United States and the Canadian provinces of Ontario and Quebec. Operating about 21,000 route miles (34,000 km) of track, it is the leading subsidiary of CSX Corporation, a Fortune 500 company headquartered in Jacksonville, Florida.

CSX Corporation was formed in 1980 from the merger of Chessie System and Seaboard Coast Line Industries, two holding companies that controlled railroads operating in the Eastern United States. Initially only a holding company, the subsidiaries that made up CSX Corporation completed merging in 1987. CSX Transportation formally came into existence in 1986, as the successor of Seaboard System Railroad. In 1999, CSX Transportation acquired about half of Conrail in a joint purchase with competitor Norfolk Southern Railway. In 2022, it acquired Pan Am Railways, extending its reach into northern New England.

Norfolk Southern remains CSX's chief competitor; the two share a duopoly on transcontinental freight rail lines in the east half of the US.

== History ==
=== Predecessors ===
CSX is the result of a number of mergers among railroads operating in the eastern United States, the earliest among them the Baltimore and Ohio Railroad (B&O) which formed in the 1820s. Many of the competing railroads along the east coast began merging from the 1950s onward as part of a broader trend of consolidation. An announcement from the New York Central (NYC) and Pennsylvania (PRR) railroads in November 1957 that they were considering combining set off discussions between the Baltimore and Ohio Railroad and the Chesapeake and Ohio Railway (C&O) on a merger. Ultimately, the financially stronger C&O took control of the B&O in December 1962, though the two railroads kept their separate identities. The NYC and PRR ultimately formed Penn Central Transportation Company in 1968, which by 1970 was bankrupt.

The combined C&O/B&O purchased stock in the Western Maryland Railway until it was able to take full control in February 1967, bringing a third railroad into the combined entity, which in 1973 became formally known as the Chessie System after the C&O's historic cat mascot Chessie.

While the railroads in Appalachia were merging, southern railroads (and historical competitors) Seaboard Air Line Railroad and Atlantic Coast Line Railroad decided to pursue a merger in 1960, which was authorized by the Interstate Commerce Commission in late 1963 and finally completed in 1967, forming the Seaboard Coast Line Railroad. The combined company absorbed the Piedmont and Northern Railway in 1969.

In the Midwest, the Louisville and Nashville Railroad (L&N) went on an acquisition spree, splitting the Chicago and Eastern Illinois Railroad (C&EI) with the Missouri Pacific Railroad in 1969. This was followed in 1971 with the acquisition of the Monon Railroad, which had complained bitterly about the C&EI split. The L&N also purchased a portion of the Tennessee Central Railway in 1969. While still independent, the L&N had long standing links to the Atlantic Coast Line, and other railroads in the region began to worry about a combined L&N/SCL system.

In 1969, the Seaboard Coast Line created Seaboard Coast Line Industries as a holding company. The Seaboard Coast Line Railroad had already held some of L&N's stock, but the new holding company began buying up as much as it could find and held nearly total control of shares by 1971. With this also came control of the Clinchfield Railroad and Georgia Railroad, both of which were nominally jointly owned by SCL and L&N. The resulting railroad conglomerate began operating under the name "Family Lines".

Despite this wave of mergers, one more was yet to come—the combination of Chessie System and the Family Lines. To this end, the CSX Corporation was organized on November 14, 1978, as a future vehicle for such a merger. Chessie and SCL Industries formally applied for ICC approval of their merger plans in January 1979, causing a rapid reaction from the region's other railroads. By April, the Norfolk and Western Railway and Southern Railway unveiled their own plans for a merger. The Southern was opposed to the planned CSX merger, but soon came to terms with Chessie and SCL and dropped its objections. On November 1, 1980, following ICC approval, CSX Corporation officially came into being as the successor of Chessie System and Seaboard Coast Line Industries. In 1982, N&W and the Southern completed their merger and formed Norfolk Southern Railway, creating a competitor to CSX.

=== Early years ===
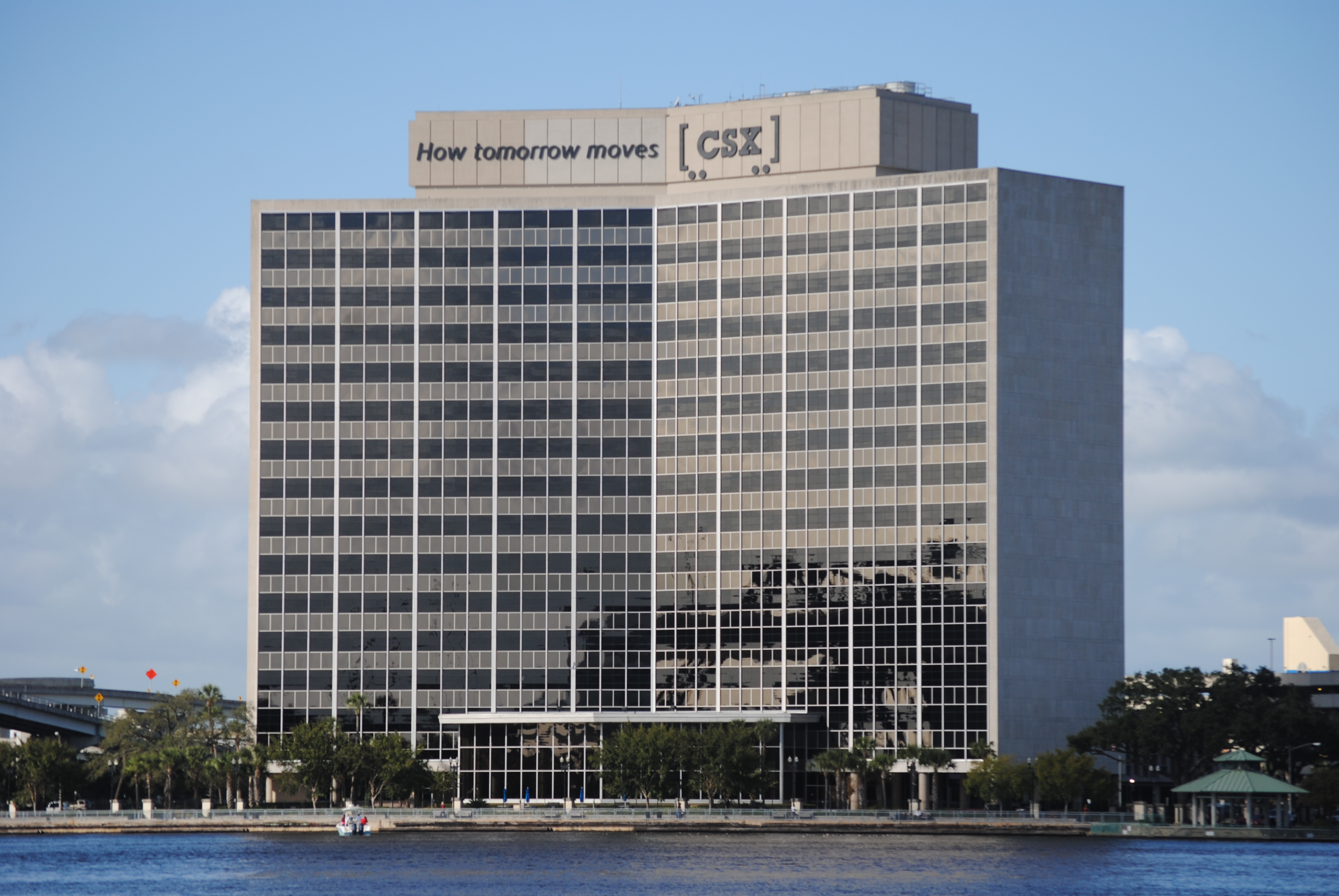
CSX Transportation Building in Jacksonville, Florida

Original logo for the CSX Corporation, emphasizing the "multiplication symbol" X

One of the first issues the new railroad grappled with was the choice of name. Chessie and SCLI leadership agreed that, as a merger of equals, neither of the existing names could be used. A call for suggestions went out to employees of both railroads, who responded with a wide variety of initialisms combining C and S in some form. At the same time, the two companies' lawyers needed a name to use as part of their proceedings with the ICC. "CSC" was chosen but belonged to a trucking company in Virginia. "CSM" (for "Chessie-Seaboard Merger") was also taken. Needing some sort of identifier for the new railroad, the lawyers decided to use "CSX", and the name stuck, despite only being intended as a placeholder. In the public announcement, it was said that "CSX is singularly appropriate. C can stand for Chessie, S for Seaboard and X, the multiplication symbol, means that together we are so much more." However, an August 9, 2016, article on the Railway Age website stated that " ... the 'X' was for 'Consolidated' ". A fourth letter had to be added to CSX when used as a reporting mark (CSXT) because reporting marks that end in X mean that the car is owned by a leasing company or private car owner. Chessie's public relations staff drafted a number of possible logos for the new railroad, but continued to strike out until it was suggested to combine the letters "C" and "S" in the shape of an X.

Despite the merger in 1980, CSX was a paper railroad (meaning no CSX painted locomotives or rolling stock) until 1986. In that year, Seaboard System changed its name to CSX Transportation. On April 30, 1987, the B&O merged into the C&O. With the Western Maryland having already merged into the C&O, this left the C&O as the sole operating railroad under the Chessie System banner. Finally, on August 31, 1987, C&O/Chessie System merged into CSX Transportation, bringing all of the major CSX railroads under one banner.

=== Conrail acquisition ===
Government formed Conrail began to show promise in the early 1980s, showing a profit for the first time under the leadership of L. Stanley Crane in the wake of the Staggers Rail Act. The Reagan Administration wished to privatize Conrail now that it had shown it could stand on its own and placed it for sale in 1983. While CSX expressed interest, it did not place a bid; however, Norfolk Southern did. When the government identified NS' bid as the winner, CSX realized it faced financial peril from a combined NS/Conrail system. The railroad fiercely argued against allowing the sale to go through, even arguing that monopoly concerns precluded a Conrail sale to either NS or CSX. Despite his history in organizing the NS merger while leading the Southern Railway, Crane was a strong advocate for Conrail's independence and proposed an alternative: privatizing Conrail through an initial public offering to the general public. Crane's solution was ultimately adopted in 1987, keeping Conrail independent.

This was not the end of CSX and NS interest in Conrail, and attempts by both competitors resumed in the 1990s. This time, CSX struck first, announcing a surprise deal to purchase Conrail in October 1996. NS promptly made an offer of its own and began a bidding war with CSX that was only resolved in January 1997 when the competitors struck a deal to split Conrail between them.

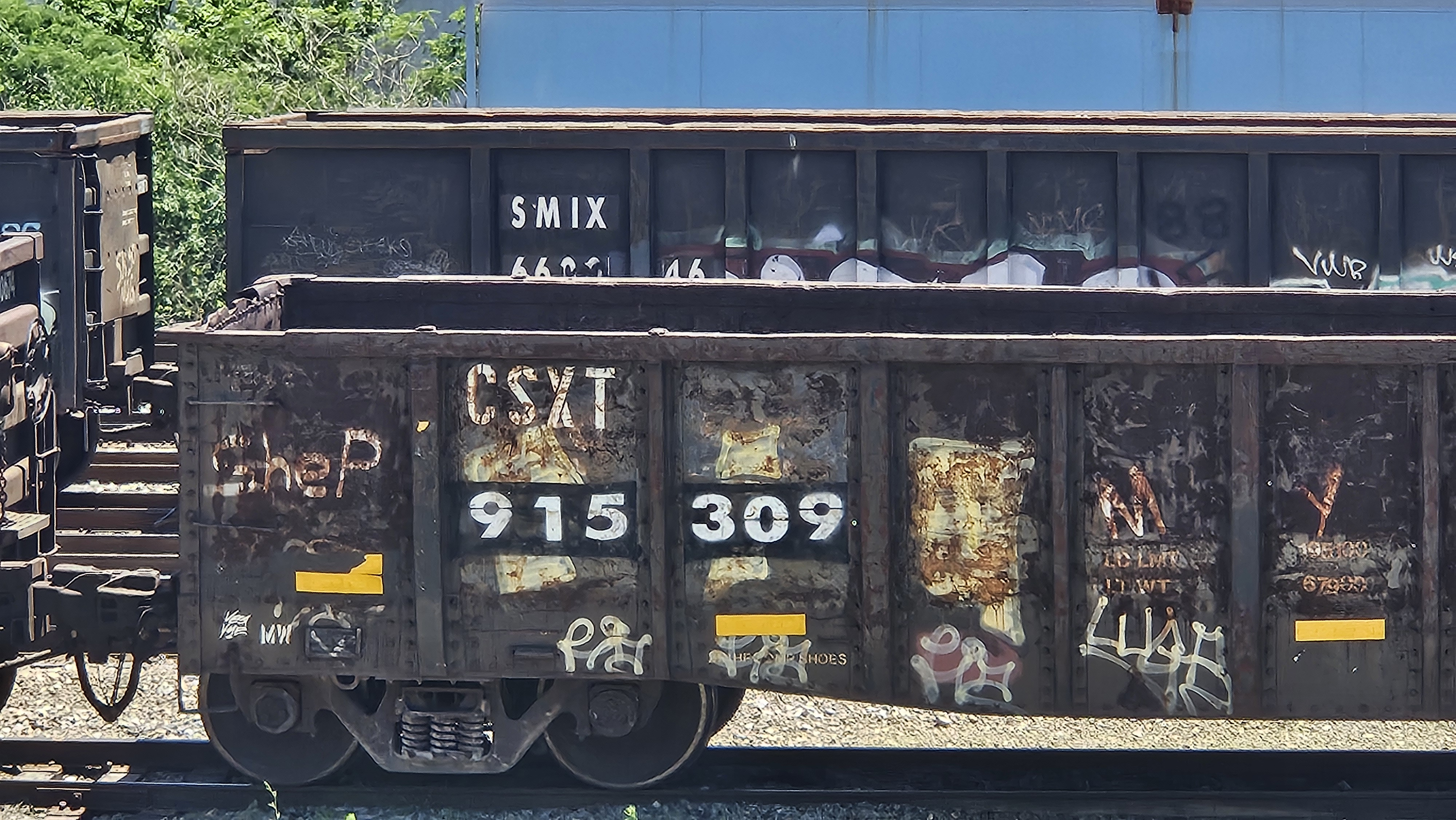
An old CSX gondola car

On June 23, 1997, CSX and Norfolk Southern Railway (NS) filed a joint application with the Surface Transportation Board for authority to purchase, divide, and operate the assets of the 11,000-mile (18,000 km) Conrail, which had been created in 1976 by bringing together several ailing Northeastern railway systems into a government-owned corporation. On June 6, 1998, the STB approved the CSX–NS application and set August 22, 1998, as the effective date of its decision. CSX acquired 42 percent of Conrail's assets, and NS received the remaining 58 percent. As a result of the transaction, CSX's rail operations grew to include some 3,800 miles (6,100 km) of the Conrail system (predominantly lines that had belonged to the former New York Central Railroad). CSX began operating its trains on its portion of the Conrail network on June 1, 1999. CSX now serves much of the Eastern United States, with a few routes into nearby Canadian cities.

The two competitors were unwilling to give one company full control of busy industrial areas in Detroit, Philadelphia, and northern New Jersey (the Chemical Coast). A compromise solution was reached by creating Conrail Shared Assets Operations, a jointly owned switching and terminal railroad which would operate in these areas on behalf of both CSX and NS.

=== Other acquisitions ===
Virginia shortline Richmond, Fredericksburg and Potomac Railroad (RF&P) was acquired by CSX in February 1990. The RF&P had historically been jointly owned by a number of connecting railroads through a holding company and operated as a bridge line. All of these owners except the Pennsylvania Railroad and the Southern Railway eventually became part of CSX, and the PRR stake was given up during the bankruptcy of Penn Central. This purchase added a new connection between Alexandria and Richmond, linking former B&O lines with those of C&O and Seaboard. However, the State of Virginia, which held partial ownership of the RF&P, was displeased with the merger agreement created by CSX. In particular the status of Potomac Yard, then a major classification yard in the RF&P system, was a matter of disagreement. The yard had potential for redevelopment, and as part of negotiations with the state, CSX ultimately agreed to decommission the rail yard by the time a deal was reached in October 1991 whereby CSX and the State of Virginia each purchased part of the RF&P.

From the 1930s, the B&O had used part of the Pittsburgh and Lake Erie Railroad (P&LE) main line from McKeesport, Pennsylvania, to West Pittsburg via a trackage rights agreement. The P&LE remained healthy enough to escape inclusion in Conrail, but a severe downturn in the steel industry in the 1980s crippled the railroad. As local traffic dried up, conditions reached the point that the B&O was running as many as 20 trains per day on the P&LE main line versus just one run by the line's owner. When P&LE employees went on strike to protest a change in ownership of the railroad, the company cut maintenance and reduced its main line to one track to cut costs. This adversely affected CSX usage of the line and sparked an interest in purchasing it outright.

An initial attempt to buy out the P&LE in partnership with an employee buyout by P&LE employees in 1988 failed when negotiations between CSX and the other railroad's unions could not come to an agreement. CSX instead purchased the P&LE main line outright in 1991, leasing it back to the P&LE. The next year, CSX formed the Three Rivers Railway as a subsidiary and purchased several key P&LE lines through it. CSX did not want the entire railroad, so some lines and company assets were instead retained by the P&LE's parent company, which ultimately sold them off.

=== Into the 21st century ===
The company introduced its current slogan, "How Tomorrow Moves", in 2008.

In 2014, Canadian Pacific Railway approached CSX with an offer to merge the two companies, but CSX declined, and in 2015 Canadian Pacific made an attempt to purchase and merge with Norfolk Southern, but NS declined to do so as well.

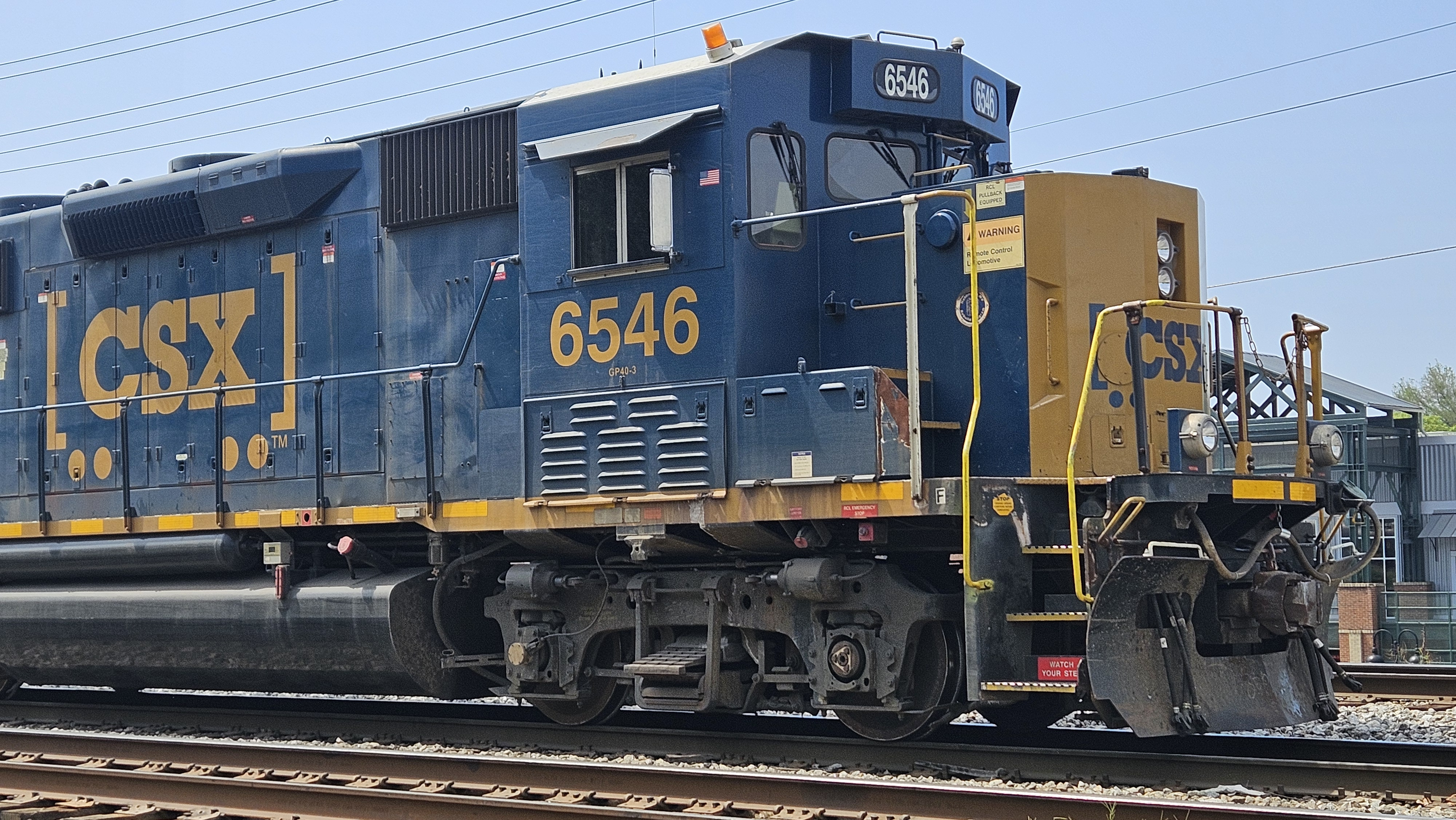
A CSX Transportation EMD GP40-3 located in Knoxville

In 2017, CSX announced Hunter Harrison would become its new chief executive officer; a settlement with activist investor Paul Hilal and Mantle Ridge. CSX added five new directors to their board, including Harrison and Mantle Ridge founder Paul Hilal. Mantle Ridge owns 4.9% of CSX. Harrison quickly moved to convert CSX rail operations to precision railroading. On December 14, 2017, CSX announced that Hunter Harrison was on medical leave. Two days after the announcement, Harrison died, one day after being hospitalized for complications of an ongoing illness. CSX initially saw a 10% drop in its stock price, but turned around to hit a new 52-week high less than a month later (January 2018). Harrison's successors have continued the shift to precision railroading, with most hump yards converted to flat yards, low volume shipping lanes eliminated and reductions in rolling stock and work force.

In 2025, CSX completed two major infrastructure projects that had limited network capacity: repairs related to damage from Hurricane Helene and a large-scale tunnel renovation in Baltimore. These efforts had negatively affected train velocity and service performance over the past year.

=== Pan Am Railways acquisition ===
On November 30, 2020, CSX Transportation's parent company CSX Corporation announced on social media that they had come to an agreement with Pan Am Systems to purchase New England based Class II Pan Am Railways, pending regulatory approval from the Surface Transportation Board. The STB approved the purchase on April 14, 2022. As part of the acquisition, Norfolk Southern Railway will gain trackage rights over several CSX lines, and Pan Am Southern, 50 percent owned by Pan Am Railways, will be operated by the Berkshire and Eastern Railroad, a new Genesee & Wyoming subsidiary formed explicitly for this purpose. CSX completed the purchase on June 1, 2022.

=== Meridian and Bigbee Railroad acquisition ===
On June 28, 2023, CSX and the newly-formed Canadian Pacific Kansas City (CPKC) announced the intention to purchase Meridian and Bigbee Railroad (MNBR). The MNBR creates a connection 168 miles (270 km) between CSX in Burkville, Alabama, near Montgomery, and Meridian, Mississippi, where it joins the Meridian Speedway heading west. Under the proposed agreement, CSX will resume operations between Montgomery and Myrtlewood, terminating the lease currently in place with MNBR, while CPKC will acquire the 50.4 miles (81.1 km) segment of the line between Myrtlewood and Meridian. MNBR will cease operations between Montgomery and Myrtlewood although it may continue to operate between Myrtlewood and Meridian, and continue to serve existing customers on that segment of the line. If the STB approves the purchase, it will provide a connection between the two companies' networks and allow CSX traffic destined for Mexico to be delivered directly to CPKC, eliminating the need for a third intermediate railroad to move such traffic. Currently, CSX traffic bound for Mexico is exchanged with the Union Pacific Railroad in New Orleans, who then takes it to the cross-border gateway in Laredo, Texas, where it is delivered to CPKC.

In October 2024, the STB approved CSX's resumption of operations on the 93.7 miles (150.8 km) leased from M&B between Burkville and Myrtlewood and CPKC's purchase of the 50.4 miles (81.1 km) miles of line between Myrtlewood and Meridian. The agreement became effective on November 16, 2024.

Initially, and for the next five years, CSX and CPKC will interchange across the line an average of two trains per day in each direction.

In turn, the Board also required CSX to maintain its Selma, AL, gateway open and to provide one shipper access to the NS at Selma at the M&B rate for five years, subject to reasonable cost escalation. It also includes conditions protecting employees affected by the line sale, and requires noise mitigation efforts regarding the CSX portion.

A few days before CSX and CPKC officially took over the former M&B line, Schneider National, CSX's one of major intermodal partners and CPKC's main partner, announced that a new interline service connecting the Southeast (Florida and Georgia) with the Texas and Mexico markets via the route between Montgomery and Meridian will be launched beginning in December.

=== Proposed merger with BNSF Railway or Canadian Pacific Kansas City ===
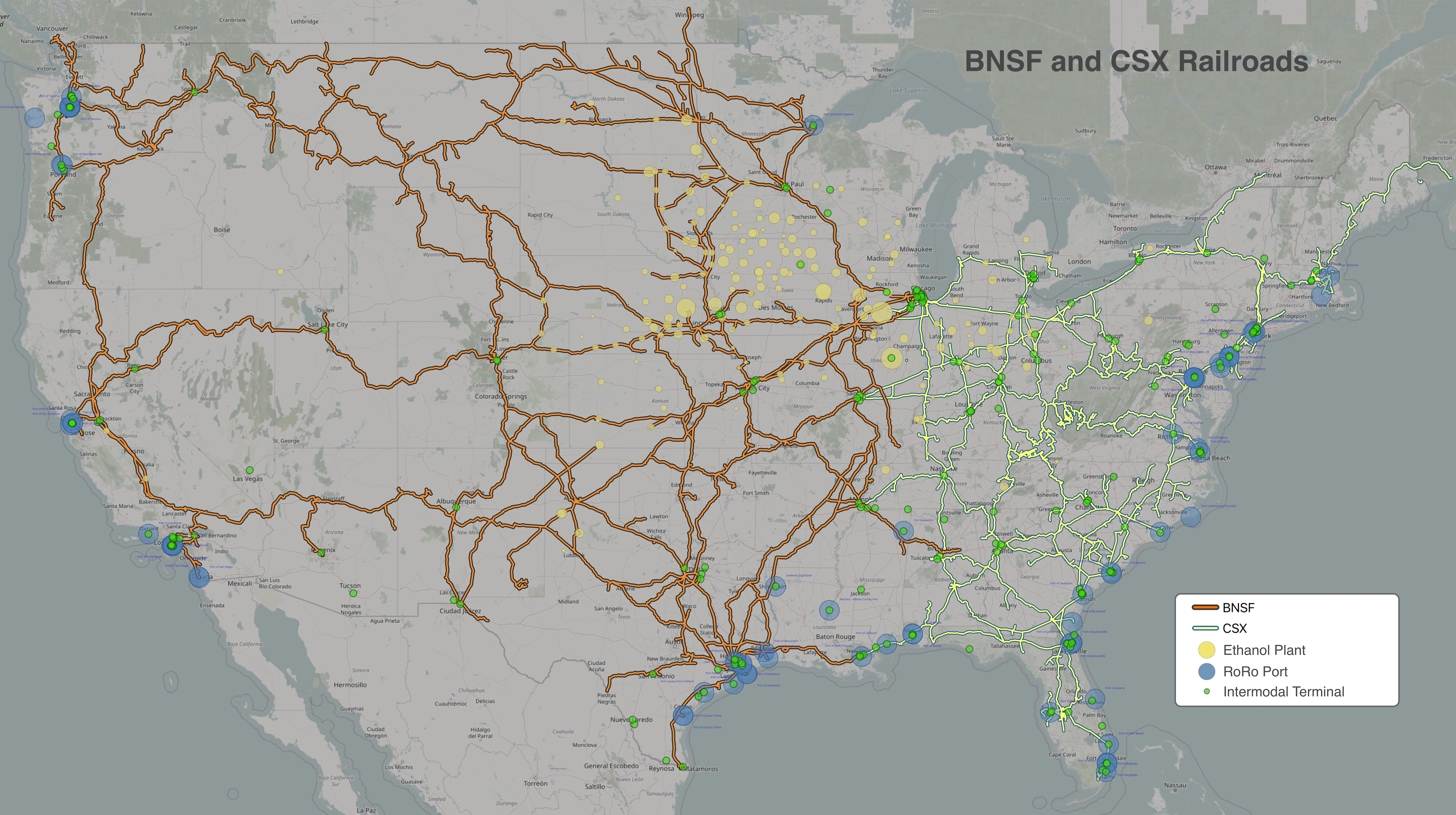
BNSF and CSX railroads

In August 2025, investor group Ancora Holdings urged the company to begin exploring a merger agreement with BNSF, the largest Class I railroad in the West, or CPKC, in response to the announced proposed mega-merger project between Union Pacific and Norfolk Southern.

At the same time, the investor group pressured the company to remove CEO and President Joe Hinrichs, citing the financial and operational decline of the railroad, among other claims. According to Trains.com, since Hinrichs joined CSX in 2022, the railroad has produced the best total shareholder returns among publicly traded Class I railroads. However, according to a March 2025 analysis by Trefis, CSX had a three-year compounded annual return of -3.7% over the period from 2021 to 2024. This was below the peer group's average return of -1.0% for the same period. According to an article in Semafor, "Hinrichs' performance over the last year was similarly lackluster. CSX's stock price was middle-of-the-pack, but it had lagged on key efficiency metrics." Hinrichs at several times asked for a pay increase for himself, which was $14 million annually.

During his tenure, CEO Joe Hinrichs emphasized cultural and workforce initiatives such as the "ONE CSX" program. He defended shareholder returns during his time as CEO, but critics have said CSX's operating ratio had deteriorated from 58 percent to about 67 percent, and second-quarter 2025 operating income fell 11% year-over-year. Some investors have questioned his "servant leadership" management style.

Citigroup analyst Ariel Rosa was perplexed by Ancora's position it provided in a letter to CSX. The letter stated:

Unfortunately, aside from bolstering employee engagement, making use of the Company's private planes and manicuring his social media footprint, we are hard pressed to find any real accomplishments tied to Mr. Hinrichs. His time at CSX is best encapsulated by this anecdote: on the very day Jim Vena and Mark George were announcing the largest merger in industry history, Mr. Hinrichs was out promoting his involvement with the Company's internship program on his tidily managed LinkedIn profile.

— Ancora letter to CSX, 8/6/25

In response, Rosa wrote:

We find this letter a bit confounding given: 1) its aggressive tone, which we believe is largely unwarranted; 2) its timing, as CSX has been showing improvement on the service issues that impacted the company earlier this year; 3) Ancora's relatively small holdings, which we calculate as less than 0.2% of CSX shares outstanding; 4) what appears to be a misrepresentation of certain facts; 5) its suggestion that CSX faces 'permanent impairment of value' if it does not act imminently; and 6) the suggestion that CSX has not been open to strategic alternatives. By pushing CSX to be a forced seller, we worry that Ancora risks deteriorating CSX's negotiating position. We believe a patient approach is likely more prudent.

— Bill Stephens of Trains on "CSX 'strongly disagrees' with activist investor's accusations"

Ancora, which also owns shares in CPKC, also urged the company to sit down and negotiate a possible merger agreement with CSX, but because the Canadian company's eventual purchase of CSX could be frowned upon by the Federal Government, the investment group has suggested that CSX buy out CPKC and retain in its place as CEO and President Keith Creel.

CSX has hired Goldman Sachs to advise it regarding any merger with BNSF or CPKC matters.

Warren Buffett, the owner of Berkshire Hathaway, BNSF's parent company, has denied that his Railroad is seeking a merger with CSX or to submit a better offer for NS. Company executives also denied rumors of an eventual merger with one of the Eastern Class I rail companies. However, they reported that they are in talks with CSX to launch new joint intermodal services from Jacksonville, Florida, Charlotte, North Carolina, Atlanta, Georgia, and the ports of New York and Newark to BNSF's intermodal terminals in Phoenix, Kansas City, Barstow, Stockton and San Bernardino.

CPKC also clarified that, for the time being, it is not interested in pursuing a merger agreement with CSX. Any major rail merger, CPKC says, poses "unprecedented risks to customers, rail employees, and the broader supply chain. Those risks would be exacerbated by the inevitable follow-on consolidation," the railway says.

CPKC also announced that it will seek to strengthen its joint intermodal service with CSX, "Southeast Mexico Express," which runs from the southeast (Georgia and Florida) to markets in Texas and Mexico.

Investor pressure had an effect, and in September 2025, Hinrichs was removed from the company's board of directors, with Steve Angel taking his place as the new CEO of CSX. Angel, an executive with a career in the chemical and railway industries when he worked at General Electric, will have the task of negotiating the eventual merger agreement with BNSF or CPKC, especially after President Donald Trump has spoken out in favor of the proposed mega-merger between UP and NS.

== Unit trains ==
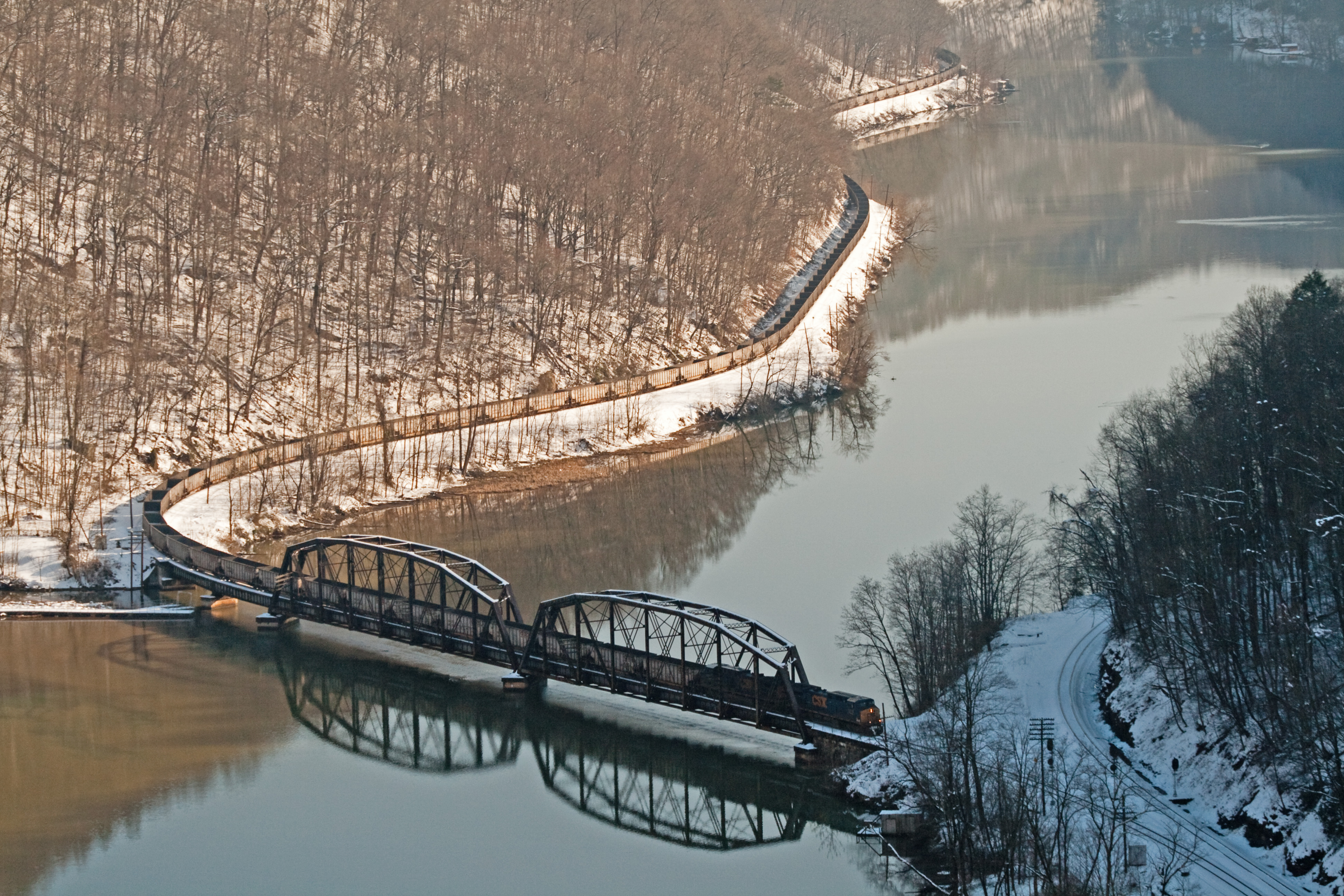
A long CSX coal train of empty hoppers crosses the New River as seen from Hawks Nest State Park

CSX operated the Juice Train which consisted of Tropicana cars that carried fresh orange juice between Bradenton, Florida, and the Greenville section of Jersey City, New Jersey. The northbound train was originally designated on CSX as K650 during the 1990s, and Q740 in the 2000s. The Juice Train has previously been studied as a model of efficient rail transportation that can compete with trucks and other modes in the perishable-goods trade. In 2017, the train was abolished from north of Tampa, Florida, and now mixed freight trains deliver the cars to their respective destinations. It still operates between Bradenton and Tampa however, but is designated as local O823.

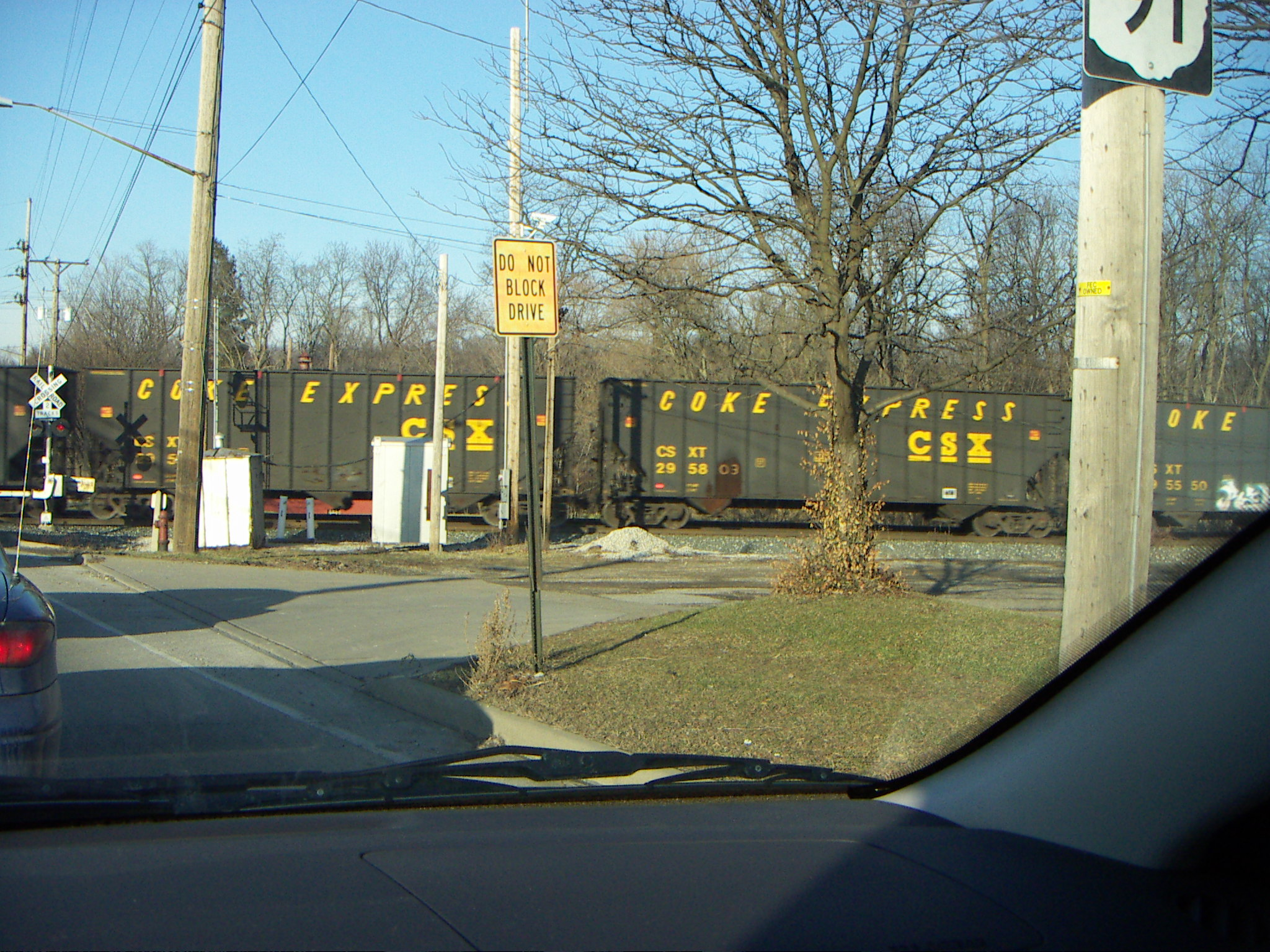
The Coke Express rolls through a level crossing. Hopper cars display both the CSX logo and the words COKE EXPRESS.

CSX operates Coke Express unit trains. They carry coke for steelmaking, power generation and other various uses, running between Pittsburgh and Chicago, and other places in the Rust Belt.

== Locomotives ==
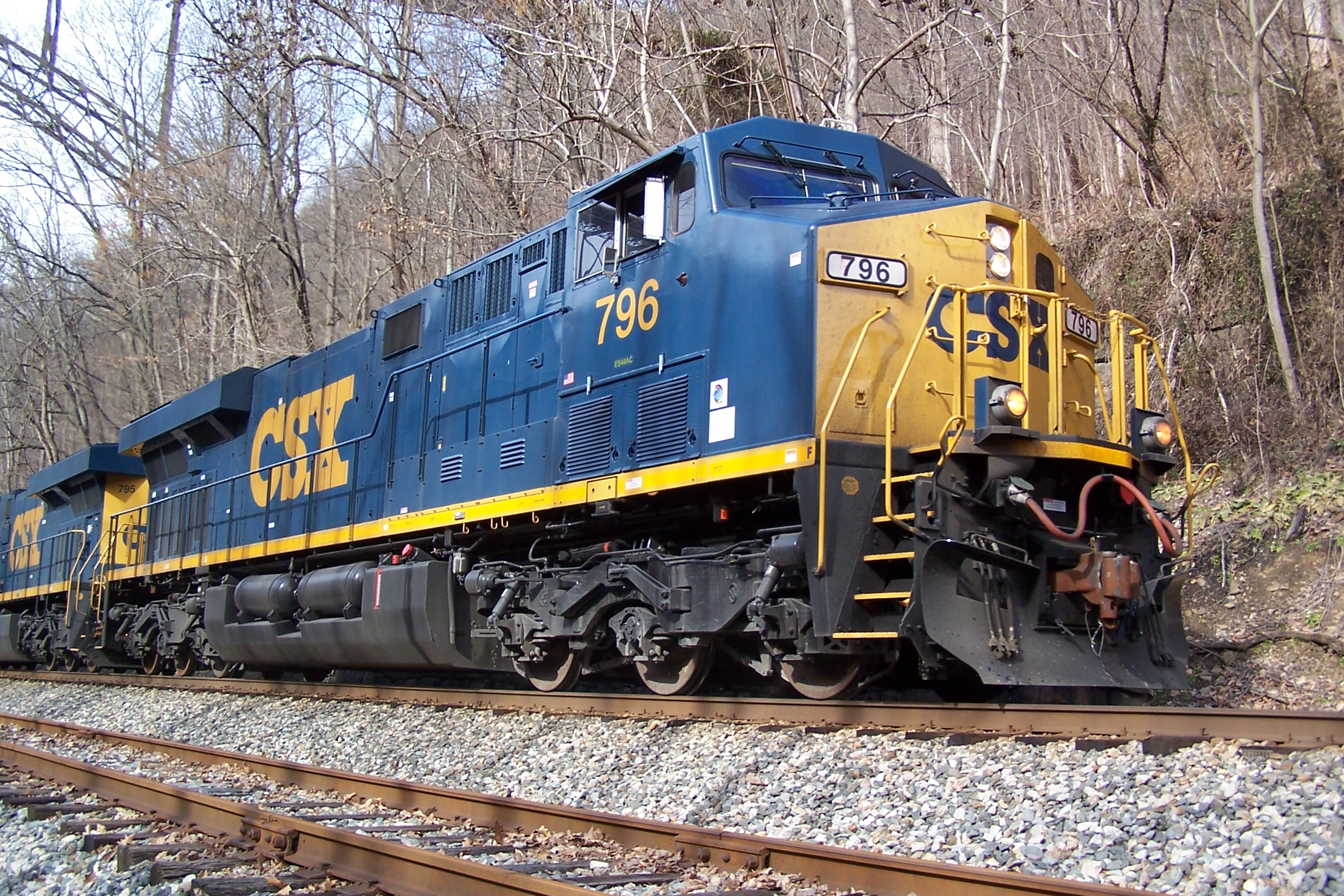
A new CSX ES44AC in the YN3 paint scheme

CSX has rebuilt a significant number of locomotives. Some of their EMD GP38-2, GP40-2, and SD40-2 locomotives have been rebuilt to Dash 3 standards with updated Wabtec Electronically Controlled Air Brakes, air conditioning, automated starting controls, a crash safe cab, a new electronic control stand, and Positive Train Control (PTC). In 2019, 25 SD70AC locomotives were rebuilt at the CSX Huntington Heavy Repair Facility, with rebuilt prime movers, in-cab electronic and comfort improvements, New York Air Brake CCB II airbrake systems, and new Mitsubishi drive controls. CSX has also partnered with Wabtec to rebuild GE locomotives at their Fort Worth facility with prime movers upgraded to the FDL Advantage spec and new electronic controls such as the Wabtec Trip Optimizer Zero-to-Zero system.

CSX has also obtained a few EMD F40PH-2s that were previously retired from Amtrak, of which are now being used for executive office car service and geometry trains. Under CSX, they were originally numbered 9992, 9993, 9998, and 9999, but in 2021, all of these locomotives except for 9999 were renumbered to CSX 1, 2, and 3, and repainted into a heritage scheme honoring the former Baltimore and Ohio Railroad. Another locomotive, ex-MARC GP40WH-2 no. 9969, was also acquired for the same purposes as the previous locomotives.

With the arrival of Hunter Harrison, CSX began to store many locomotives. Following Harrison's death, his replacement James Foote largely continued his policies. The company had over 900 locomotives in storage in January 2018.

CSX ordered ten SD70ACe-T4s in August 2018, which were delivered in July the following year. They are classified as ST70AHs. CSX also has a contract with Wabtec for modernizing their fleet of CW44s. The modernized locomotives, nearly thirty in number as of June 2020, are being classified as CM44AC. In February 2024, CSX and Wabtec reached a new agreement, of which, involves the modernization of over 200 locomotives. This accounts for the rest of the active roster of CW44ACs & CW44AHs. The locomotives will be modernized through 2028.

On April 30, 2019, CSX unveiled locomotives 911 and 1776, two ES44AH locomotives created to honor the first responders and veterans respectively. Another special unit, ES44AH 3194, was unveiled on August 22, 2019, in honor of the law enforcement. On September 13, 2022, CSX unveiled SD70AC 4568 painted in honor of Operation Lifesaver's 50th anniversary. On December 31, 2024, CSX unveiled another SD70AC 4720 painted in honor of their 'One CSX' initiative that honors the railroads employees. On January 27, 2025, CSX unveiled another SD70AC 911343 as a prop for training first responders as part of their safety train. On June 8, 2026, CSX unveiled two rebuild CM44AH locomotives 250 and 2026 to celebrate the 250th anniversary of the United States of America.

=== Heritage units ===
In May 2023, CSX unveiled their heritage unit program, beginning with ES44AH No. 1827 being painted for the Baltimore and Ohio Railroad. CSX then stated that a total of 21 heritage locomotives would be painted over the coming months, with the locomotive number coinciding with the year the railroad was founded or the name began being used.

In the early 2020s a CSX EMD GP38-2 and two CSX EMD GP40-2 locomotives were adorned with heritage paint. Locomotive #2625 was adorned with a Louisville & Nashville themed nose, locomotive #6914 adorned a Chessie System livery on its nose, and the third locomotive #6394 (an ex RF&P unit) was adorned with a fantasy Richmond, Fredericksburg and Potomac scheme.

== Safety ==
In 1995, CSX started a new liability insurance requirement of $200 million to introduce their official policy, "no steam on its own wheels", banning the operation of steam locomotives and other antique rail equipment on their trackage due to safety concerns, and increased risk.

=== List of accidents and incidents ===
- 1986 Miamisburg train derailment near Miamisburg, Ohio
- 1993 Big Bayou Canot rail accident, near Mobile, Alabama
- 1996 Maryland train collision, in Silver Spring, Maryland
- 1997 West Virginia train collision; one killed
- 2000 Tennga, Georgia bus–train collision; 3 killed, 4 injured
- 2001 CSX 8888 incident, in northwest Ohio, 1 minor injury. This was the inspiration for the 2010 action film Unstoppable
- 2001 Howard Street Tunnel fire, in Baltimore, Maryland
- 2007 Brooks derailment, in Brooks, Kentucky
- 2011 Mineral Springs, North Carolina, train wreck-fire involving 2 (Union Pacific) units and its train of fuel tankers at the back, 2 killed
- 2012 Ellicott City, Maryland, train derailment, two killed
- 2013 Spuyten Duyvil derailment
- 2014 Midnight Rider train incident
- 2015 Mount Carbon train derailment, Mount Carbon, West Virginia
- 2015 Tennessee train derailment, Maryville, Tennessee
- 2017 Biloxi, Mississippi collision with tour bus stuck on tracks; 4 killed, 44 injured
- 2017 Pittsburgh suburb coal cars derailment
- 2017 Hyndman, Pennsylvania derailment, chemical release and fire
- 2017 Atlanta derailment destroys occupied home
- 2018 Cayce, South Carolina, train collision involving Amtrak Silver Star and a CSX autorack train (Q210-03). 2 dead, 116 injured.
- 2018 Worcester, Massachusetts, derailment – On July 21, 2018, a CSX Intermodal train from Worcester, Massachusetts, hits a low overpass, causing 12 cars to derail. One car nearly crashed into a car full of toxic chemicals, engineer injured.
- 2021 Barnsley, Kentucky, tornado – On December 10, 2021, an EF4 tornado struck and derailed a CSX train, throwing several cars uphill, including one that landed on a house.
- 2023 Rockland County, New York, wildfire – On April 14 and 15, 2023, a multitude of wildfires broke out in suburban Rockland County, New York. Several firefighters suffered heat exhaustion battling the flames, and the fires inflicted some damage on property and structures. An investigation into these incidents is underway, with local officials claiming that a CSX train passing through several towns lit sparks, which then ignited on an unseasonably dry day with record-high temperatures upwards of 90 °F.
- 2023 Rockcastle County, Kentucky. 16 cars, two containing molten sulphur and two filled with magnesium hydroxide derailed, causing a large fire that required hundreds of responders to contain. A state of emergency was declared by the governor and residents of the town of Livingston were evacuated. There were no reports of injuries.
- 2025 Todd County, Kentucky, derailment. On December 30, 2025, a derailment caused a release of molten sulfur which led to a five-hour shelter in place for the nearby city of Trenton, KY. No reported injuries.

== Major yards ==
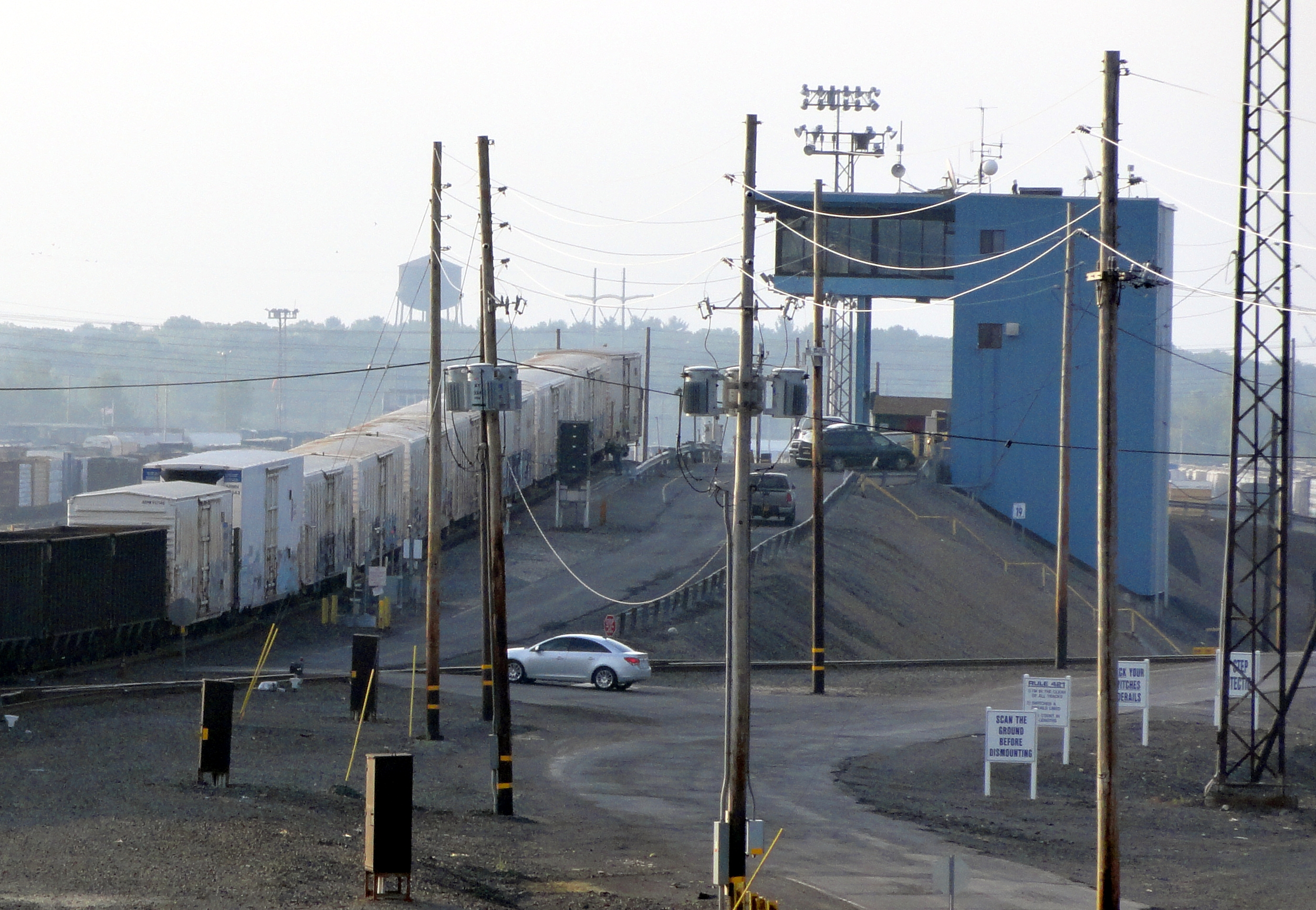
Hump and control tower at Selkirk Yard

=== Hump yards ===
In hump yards, trains are slowly pushed over a small hill as cars are uncoupled at the crest of the hill and allowed to roll down the hump into the appropriate tracks for outbound trains.

- Avon, Indiana – Avon Yard
- Cincinnati, Ohio – Queensgate Yard
- Cumberland, Maryland –
- Nashville, Tennessee – Radnor Yard
- Selkirk, New York – Selkirk Yard
- Waycross, Georgia – Rice Yard

== Financials ==
In 2024, CSX Transportation reported total revenue of $14.54 billion and net income of $3.47 billion. The company's market capitalization was approximately $61.2 billion at the end of the year, with estimates in August and September 2025 ranging from $60.4 billion to $60.6 billion.

In the third quarter of 2025, CSX reported net income of approximately $694 million, a decline of about 22% compared to the same period in the previous year. The decrease was primarily due to a $164 million goodwill impairment charge, attributed to weaker coal markets and other factors. Revenue was approximately $3.59 billion, which was flat or slightly down year over year. Company management noted that near-term performance was affected by reduced volumes in the coal and automotive sectors.

In December 2025, the company disbanded its aviation department "which flew corporate jets to whisk railroad executives around the system and elsewhere."

== See also ==
- Duke Energy Holiday Trains
- History of railroads in Michigan
- List of CSX Transportation lines
- List of CSX Transportation predecessor railroads
- National Gateway
- Railex (refrigerated rail service – CSX and Union Pacific Railroad)
- Union Pacific Railroad

== Book sources ==
- Solomon, Brian (2005). CSX. Saint Paul, MN: MBI Publishing Co. ISBN 978-0-7603-1796-9. OCLC 57641636.
