= Richard K. Davidson =

American railway executive (1942–2026)

- Born: January 9, 1942; Allen, Kansas, U.S.
- Died: May 31, 2026 (aged 84); Dallas, Texas, U.S.
- Education: Bachelor of Arts (History), Washburn University
- Occupation: Railroad executive
- Known for: CEO of Union Pacific
- Spouse: Trish Davidson

Richard K. Davidson (January 9, 1942 – May 31, 2026) was an American railway executive.

== Early life ==
Davidson was born in Allen, Kansas on January 9, 1942, to Richard Davidson, a farmer working in soil conservation, and his wife Thelma. His father died when he was six years old.

== Railroad career ==
Davidson entered the railroad business at eighteen by working as a brakeman/conductor nights and weekends with the Missouri Pacific Railroad to cover the expense of studying at Washburn University, where he graduated in 1966. In 1968, at twenty-six, he became a superintendent, and was transferred to Shreveport, Louisiana. In 1976, he was moved to the headquarters in St. Louis and became vice president of operations. In 1982, when Union Pacific Railroad merged with Missouri Pacific, he was promoted to vice president of operations for the combined company. He was promoted to President and CEO in 1991 and Chairman and CEO in 1997.

His tenure as CEO began in the midst of a crisis due to system incompatibilities as Union Pacific absorbed Southern Pacific Railroad. The company's stock dropped throughout the remainder of the 1990s, and would not recover until 2002. He was awarded Railroader of the Year in 2003. He retired as CEO in 2006, and as Chairman in 2007.

== Death ==
Davidson died in Dallas, Texas on May 31, 2026, at the age of 84.

== See also ==
- List of railroad executives

Awards and achievements
Preceded by E. Hunter Harrison (BN, IC, CN)	Railroader of the Year; 2003	Succeeded by Robert J. Ritchie (CP)
