= Brooks derailment =

2007 rail accident in Kentucky, US

Details
- Date: January 16, 2007; 19 years ago 8:46 am
- Location: Bullitt County, Kentucky
- Coordinates: 38.068°N 85.711°W
- Country: United States
- Operator: CSX Transportation
- Incident type: Derailment

Statistics
- Deaths: 0
- Injured: 0

The Brooks derailment was a rail accident that occurred in Brooks, Bullitt County, Kentucky, United States, about 15 miles south of Louisville.

At 08:43 EST on January 16, 2007, a CSX Transportation train pulling 80 cars from Birmingham, Alabama, to Louisville, Kentucky, derailed. The accident caused a fireball to explode over 1,000 feet into the sky. The cars were carrying several hazardous materials that resulted in an evacuation of the immediate area. The derailment was determined to be the largest in Kentucky's history.

The responders to the accident were Zoneton Fire Protection District and several Louisville fire districts.

The residents affected by the accident reached a settlement with the rail company.

On March 30, 2012, the National Transportation Safety Board released their conclusion regarding the probable cause:

The National Transportation Safety Board determines that the probable cause of the accident was the failure of the 18th rail car to properly negotiate a curve because of the inadequate side bearing clearance of the B-end truck assembly, likely due to a broken side bearing wedge plate attachment bolt, which caused a wheel to climb the rail, which derailed the car. Contributing to the derailment was (1) the undesirable contact of the truck bolster bowl rim with the car body center plate and (2) the hollow worn wheels on the 18th car, which further diminished the steering ability of the truck assembly.
