= Richard F. Timmons =

United States Army general

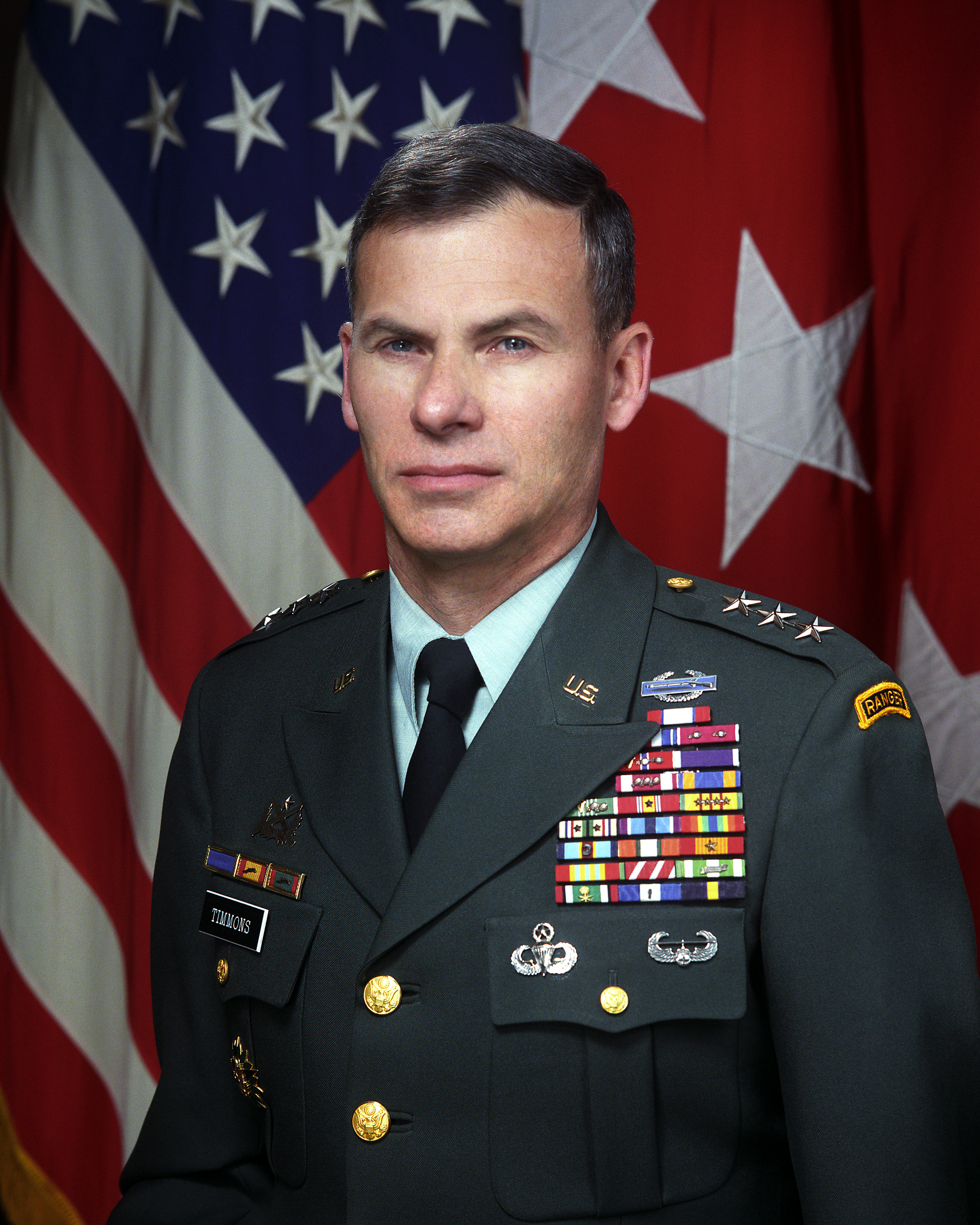
- Timmons in 1994, as a Lieutenant General in the US Army
- Born: Richard Franklin Timmons; December 24, 1942 (age 82); Washington, D.C., U.S.
- Education: U.S. Army War College; B.A. (History), Virginia Military Institute; Master's (Personnel Administration) Central Michigan University; Master's (Journalism) University of Alabama; Yale School of Management; John F. Kennedy School of Government; U.S. Army Command and General Staff College
- Occupation(s): Army general, railroad executive
- Known for: 2006 Railroader of the Year

Richard Franklin Timmons (born December 24, 1942) is a former American military officer and retired railroad executive.

== Early life and education ==
Born in Washington, D.C., Timmons is a 1961 graduate of McLean High School. He earned a B.A. degree in history from the Virginia Military Institute in 1965. Timmons later earned a master's degree in personnel administration from Central Michigan University and a master's degree in journalism from the University of Alabama.

== Military career ==
As a military officer, Timmons commanded companies in the 173rd Airborne Brigade Combat Team in South Vietnam. Later, he served as liaison officer to the U.S. Senate, was Executive Officer to the Secretary of the Army, commanded the 7th Infantry Division from 1993 to 1994 and commanded the Eighth Army in Korea from 1994 to 1997. He performed the final official flight of the OV-1 Mohawk in September 1996 at Camp Humphreys in South Korea. Timmons retired from the military after thirty-two years of service.

Timmons received the Distinguished Service Medal, the Silver Star Medal, three awards of the Legion of Merit, three Bronze Star Medals, the Purple Heart, four Meritorious Service Medals and the Air Medal.

== Railroad career ==
Timmons joined Norfolk Southern in 1998, becoming Resident Vice President for Public Affairs for Pennsylvania and New York. He left for the position of President of the American Short Line and Regional Railroad Association on September 3, 2002.

He was awarded Railway Age's "Railroader of the Year" in 2006. After a one-year extension of his tenure at the board's request, he retired at the end of 2014, replaced by Linda Darr.

== Personal ==
Timmons is the son of Robert Lee Timmons (May 14, 1919 – August 23, 1950) and Jane Winifred Smithdeal (October 5, 1919 – June 13, 2014). Natives of Washington, D.C., the couple were married there on November 20, 1941. His father was an Army infantry officer who served during World War II and was later killed in action during the Battle of Sobuk-san in the Korean War, receiving the Silver Star posthumously. On December 19, 1954 in Alexandria, Virginia, his mother remarried with William Joseph Dailey (January 15, 1920 – August 23, 1981), an Army officer who had also served during World War II and the Korean War. His father, mother and stepfather are all buried at Arlington National Cemetery.

On June 14, 1965, Timmons married Margaret Ann Hopper in Fairfax County, Virginia.

== See also ==
- List of railroad executives

Awards and achievements
Preceded by David R. Goode (NS)	Railroader of the Year; 2006	Succeeded by Bill Wimmer (UP)
