= Robert M. Brown =

American engineer

Robert M. Brown was the Chief Engineer for Union Pacific Railroad in the 1960s and 1970s. For his work with the railroad, Modern Railways magazine selected Brown to receive the magazine's Man of the Year award in 1978; the award has since been continued by Railway Age magazine as the Railroader of the Year. He was the first railway Chief Engineer to receive this honor that was previously awarded only to top-level executives. Brown was also involved in the hiring process at Union Pacific for Bill Wimmer, the 2007 recipient of the Railroader of the Year award, and coincidentally, only the second Chief Engineer to be chosen for the honor.

Preceded by Edward G. Jordan (CR)	Modern Railways magazine Man of the Year; 1978	Succeeded by Theodore C. Lutz (WMATA)
