= Jackson Graham =

American general (1915–1985)

Major General Graham, Jackson
- Born: June 27, 1915
- Died: March 2, 1985 (aged 69)
- Military career
- Branch: United States Army
- Rank: Major General
- Other work: General manager, Washington Metropolitan Area Transit Authority (1967–1975)

Jackson Graham (June 27, 1915 – March 2, 1985) was a major general of the Army Corps of Engineers in the United States Army and was the first general manager for the Washington Metropolitan Area Transit Authority (WMATA).

== Early life and education ==
He was born in Mosier, Oregon, and during high school he joined his father, a bridge construction foreman on the construction of the main piers of the Golden Gate Bridge as well as several other projects. He received a Bachelor of Science in civil engineering from Oregon State University in 1936. He was student body president at OSU during his senior year and served in the Reserve Officers Training Corps.

== Military service ==
Finishing in the top 3 percent on an army exam, he won a regular army engineering commission. He served with two combat engineer units in the European Theater during World War II and commanded three heavy pontoon battalions at Remagen. He gained the temporary rank of colonel just days before V-E day. During the Korean War, he commanded two engineer aviation groups. In the early 1950s, he served as the Corps of Engineers' chief of personnel. Later in his career he was district engineer in Portland, Oregon, and then in 1963 as a brigadier general he became commander of the Ohio River Division, in charge of all civil and military construction for 14 states. He became a major general in 1965 and was posted to Director of Civil Works. However, also in 1966, he underwent open-heart surgery to replace his Aortic Valve and retired in 1967 from the army with full disability.

== WMATA General Manager ==
Jackson and his wife, Mabel Lee, were planning a retirement in their motor home when approached by WMATA Chairman Walter Tobriner and NCTA Administrator Walter McCarter about taking the position of General Manager. Accepting after repeated pleas and after satisfying himself that the subway was going to be built, he was sworn in on March 17, 1967. He retired in early 1976.

== Honors ==
- Oregon State University Distinguished Service Award (1977)
- Inductee into Oregon Stater Engineering Hall of Fame (1999)
