= Bill Wimmer =

American railroad executive

- Born: William E. Wimmer
- Occupation: Railroad executive
- Known for: 2007 Railroader of the Year

Bill Wimmer is an American railroad executive who worked in operations for the Union Pacific Railroad.

Wimmer started with the Chicago and North Western Railway in 1957, eventually becoming division engineer. He moved to Union Pacific in 1974.

As Vice President-Engineering, he was awarded the 2007 Railroader of the Year award. He was the second chief engineer to receive the award, after 1978's Robert M. Brown, also of Union Pacific, who had been his mentor. In June 2008, he was promoted to Vice President-Operations; he retired shortly thereafter, in July. He has served on the board of the R.J. Corman Railroad Group since December 2009.

Since retiring, he and his wife run a railroad museum in Beaver Lake, south of Plattsmouth, Nebraska.

== See also ==
- List of railroad executives

Awards and achievements
Preceded by Richard F. Timmons (American Short Line and Regional Railroad Association)	Railroader of the Year; 2007	Succeeded by Steve Tobias (NS)
