= Eighteenmile Island =

Island on the Oregon side of the Columbia River, Oregon, United States

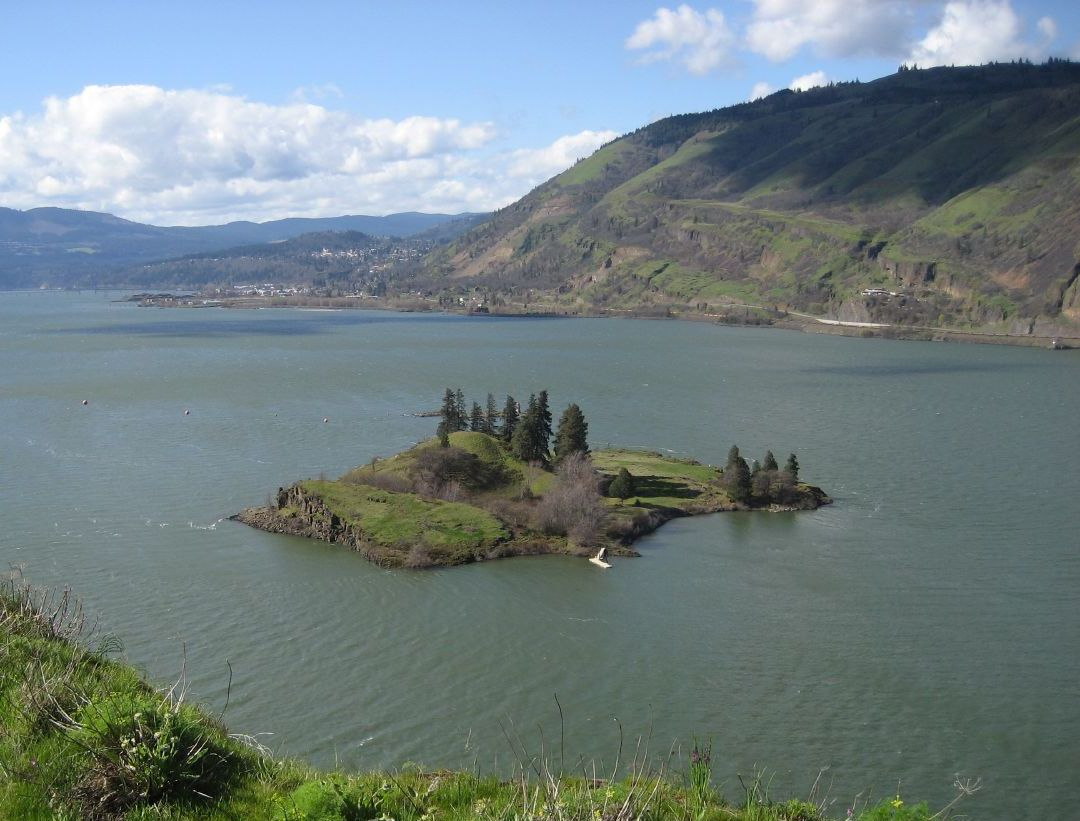
- Eighteenmile Island from an observation point on the Oregon side
- Interactive map of Eighteenmile Island

Geography
- Location: Wasco County, near Mosier, Oregon
- Coordinates: 45°41′23″N 121°25′17″W
- Area: 9.89 acres (4.00 ha)

Administration
- United States
- State: Oregon
- County: Wasco

Eighteenmile Island is a 9.89 acre (4 ha) island on the Oregon side of the Columbia River at river mile 174 in Wasco County, Oregon, United States. The official name derives from its location 18 nautical miles west of Big Eddy and the historic narrows now covered by The Dalles Dam. It is about a half mile (0.8 km) downstream of Mosier, Oregon and four miles (6.4 km) upstream of Hood River. It can be seen from Interstate 84, which runs along the Oregon side of the Columbia River, and from the Historic Columbia River Highway. A small rocky "island" downstream of Eighteenmile Island houses a navigational light. The island is mentioned in the journal of Meriwether Lewis, from the Lewis and Clark Expedition.

== Geography ==
The small island is located in the Columbia River Gorge region. It was mostly barren as of 2007, but features several large pine trees and willows, a basalt cliff, wildflowers, wild cherry trees, blackberry thickets, and a sandy beach. It is closer to the Oregon side of the river, and only a few hundred feet from its shoreline.

The island's only structure is a private residence, a three-story wood-frame house built in 1969. A line from the mainland supplies electricity to the island; drinking water is filtered from the Columbia. The island can only be accessed by boat.

== History ==
During the 20th century it was popularly called Chicken Charlie's Island, after Charles Reither, who lived on the island from 1915 until his death in 1963. There were not actually chickens on the island during Reither's residency, but there may have been a chicken ranch there around 1904. A 1919 tax survey indicates a "George W. Reither", Charles' brother, lived on the island as well. Reither was given title to the island in 1922 from the Bureau of Land Management. It was officially referred to as "Eighteenmile Island" by the United States Geological Survey as early as 1934. It is still referred to as Chicken Charlie's Island on some maps.

== Ownership ==
Eighteenmile Island is one of very few remaining privately owned islands, such as Homestead Island in the Hanford Reach, on the Columbia River. Zoning prohibits further development on the island beyond the one existing house. In 2000 when the island was offered for sale, local and federal officials considered buying it to protect it, but deemed that unnecessary as the strict zoning would prevent unwanted development anyway.

The island and house were offered for sale for the listing price of $1.4 million in 2005 and again in 2007.

Currently the Island is owned by prominent Christian bible camp Camp Morrow. Little is known what the present owners plan to do with the property.
