= Michael J. Ward =

American CEO

- Born: Michael John Ward; September 2, 1950 (age 75); Baltimore, Maryland
- Education: University of Maryland (BBA, 1972); Harvard Business School (MBA, 1976)
- Occupation: Railroad executive
- Known for: Chairman and CEO of CSX Corporation

Michael J. Ward was the Chairman and CEO of CSX Corporation, a holding company focused on railroads, from 2003 to 2017.

== Life ==
Michael Ward served as chairman and chief executive officer of CSX Corporation for fourteen years. CSX is one of the nation's premier transportation and logistics companies. Over his 40-year career, Ward headed CSX's operations, coal sales and marketing, and finance departments.

A native to Baltimore, he is the oldest of eight siblings; his father owned a pool hall, which he started working in at the age of eleven. He was the first in his family to earn a college degree, which he paid for by working at an asphalt company during the summer. After getting his MBA from Harvard at his father's suggestion, he started working at Chessie System, which would later become CSX. He became President of CSX Transportation in 2000, then of CSX Corporation in 2002, then Chairman and CEO in 2003. In 2009, he was named Railway Age's Railroader of the Year. He stepped down as CEO of CSX in May 2017 and was succeeded by E. Hunter Harrison.

Under Ward's leadership, the company continually achieved record safety performances while providing vital services to customers and posting strong financial results for shareholders. On the Harvard Business Review November 2016 ranking of The Best-Performing CEOs in the World, Ward ranked 26th in generating the best return for shareholders and the environment.

Ward's commitment to personal philanthropy and corporate citizenship has been recognized with City Year's prestigious "Lifetime of Idealism Award"., the Association of Fundraising Professionals FL, First Coast Chapter's 2023 National Philanthropy Lifetime Achievement Award., and the 2025 UNCF Champion of Education Award. Ward serves on various not for profit boards including City Year (http://www.cityyear.org/jacksonville/), Edward Waters University (http://www.ew.edu/), Hubbard House (http://www.hubbardhouse.org/), and Generation W (http://genwnow.com/).

Combining personal giving and donations through his private foundation, the Michael Ward and Jennifer Glock Foundation, Ward has donated over $62M to various charitable causes. The focus of the giving has been increasing educational opportunities and results in elementary schools, middle schools, high schools, and college, as well as promoting healthy relationships, preventing domestic violence, support of the military and the arts.

Business positions
Preceded by	President of CSX Corporation; 2002-2015	Succeeded by Oscar Muñoz
Preceded by	CEO of CSX Corporation; 2003-present	Succeeded by E. Hunter Harrison
Preceded by	Chairman of CSX Corporation; 2003-present	Succeeded by Edward J. Kelly III
Preceded by Steve Tobias	Railroader of the Year; 2009	Succeeded by Matthew K. Rose
