= Mosier, Oregon =

- City
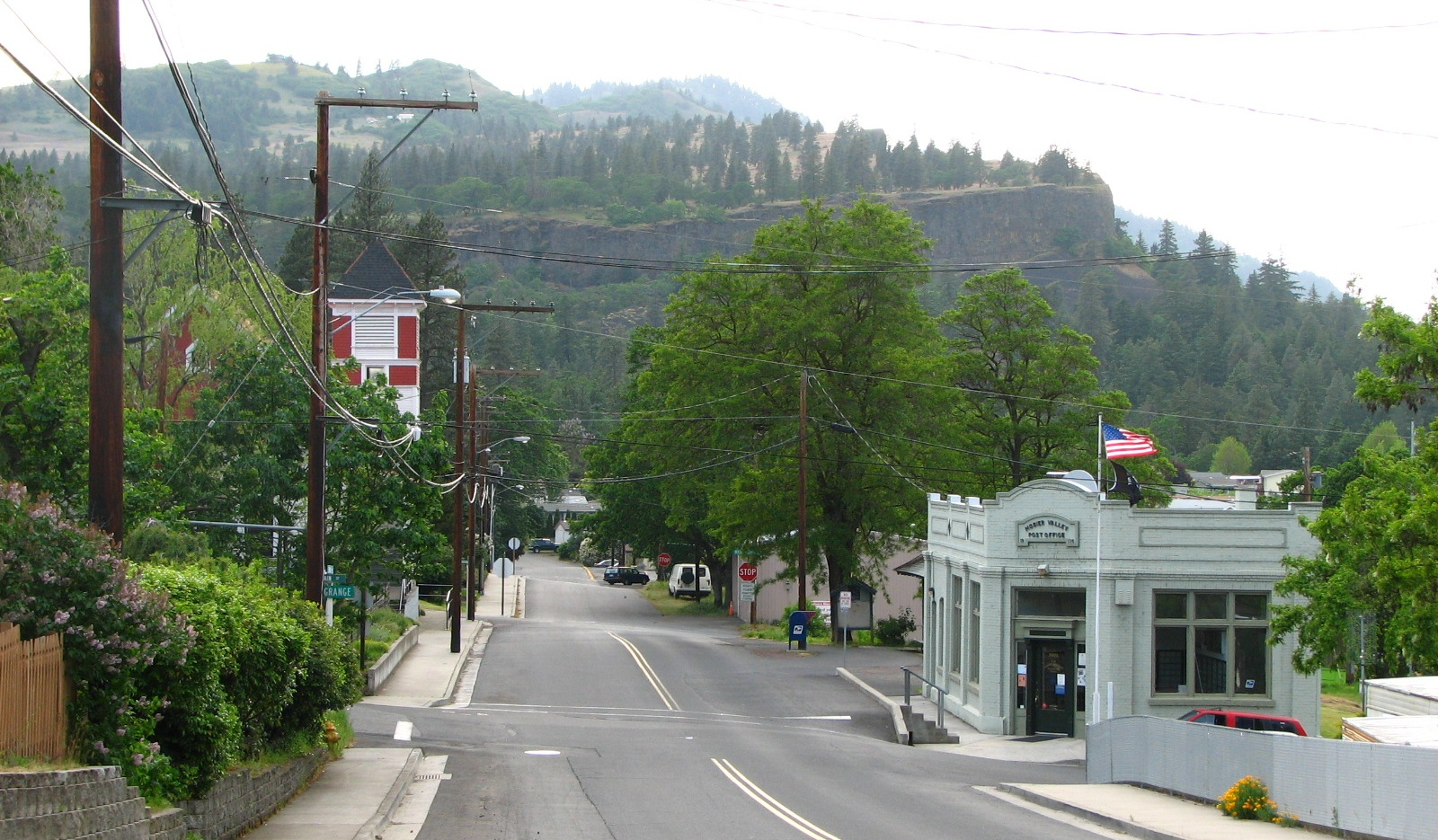
- Nickname: Home of the Twin Tunnels
- Motto: Small enough to make a difference
- Location in Oregon
- Coordinates: 45°41′06″N 121°23′42″W
- Country: United States
- State: Oregon
- County: Wasco
- Incorporated: 1914

Government
  - Mayor: G. Witt Anderson

Area
  - Total: 0.63 sq mi (1.64 km^{2})
  - Land: 0.46 sq mi (1.18 km^{2})
  - Water: 0.18 sq mi (0.46 km^{2})
- Elevation: 102 ft (31 m)

Population (2020)
  - Total: 468
  - Density: 1,025.9/sq mi (396.12/km^{2})
- Time zone: UTC-8 (Pacific)
  - Summer (DST): UTC-7 (Pacific)
- ZIP code: 97040
- Area code: 541
- FIPS code: 41-50050
- GNIS feature ID: 2411174
- Website: cityofmosier.gov

Mosier is a city along the Columbia River in Wasco County, Oregon, United States. As of the 2020 census, Mosier had a population of 468.

== History ==
Mosier was first settled in 1854 and incorporated as a city in 1914. The building now known as the post office was at that time the bank, and the original safe is still intact on-site. Mosier School was built in 1920 and until 1963 was a 1st–12th grade 1A school. From 1964 to 2002 it functioned as part of the Chenowith School District as an elementary school that ranged from kindergarten to fifth grade. In January 2003, the Chenowith School District approved the charter application for Mosier Elementary to become a charter school known as Mosier Community School.

On June 3, 2016, a 96-car oil train derailed near Mosier. Eleven cars derailed and at least one caught on fire, only 20 feet away from the city's sewage treatment facility.

== Geography ==
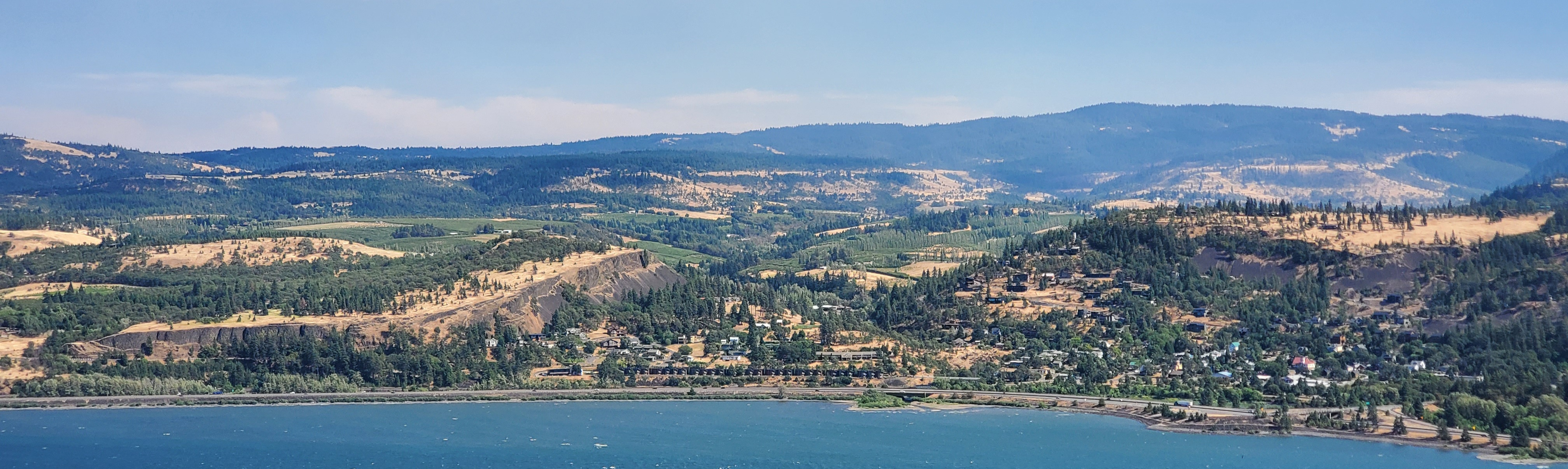
Mosier, Oregon from North Washington State side of Columbia River

According to the United States Census Bureau, the city has a total area of 0.64 square miles (1.66 km^{2}), of which, 0.47 square miles (1.22 km^{2}) is land and 0.17 square miles (0.44 km^{2}) is water.

Eighteenmile Island is located a half-mile downstream of the city in the Columbia River.

=== Climate ===
This region experiences warm (but not hot) and dry summers, with no average monthly temperatures above 71.6 °F. According to the Köppen Climate Classification system, Mosier has a warm-summer Mediterranean climate, abbreviated "Csb" on climate maps.

== Demographics ==
Historical population
Census	Pop.	Note	%±
1920	259		—
1930	192		−25.9%
1940	216		12.5%
1950	259		19.9%
1960	252		−2.7%
1970	217		−13.9%
1980	340		56.7%
1990	244		−28.2%
2000	410		68.0%
2010	433		5.6%
2020	468		8.1%
U.S. Decennial Census

=== 2020 census ===
As of the 2020 census, Mosier had a population of 468 and a median age of 43.9 years. 16.7% of residents were under the age of 18 and 22.4% were 65 years of age or older. For every 100 females there were 94.2 males, and for every 100 females age 18 and over there were 88.4 males age 18 and over.

0% of residents lived in urban areas, while 100.0% lived in rural areas.

There were 205 households in Mosier, of which 24.9% had children under the age of 18 living in them. Of all households, 36.6% were married-couple households, 25.9% were households with a male householder and no spouse or partner present, and 27.8% were households with a female householder and no spouse or partner present. About 34.2% of all households were made up of individuals and 18.5% had someone living alone who was 65 years of age or older.

There were 278 housing units, of which 26.3% were vacant. Among occupied housing units, 73.2% were owner-occupied and 26.8% were renter-occupied. The homeowner vacancy rate was 3.8% and the rental vacancy rate was 9.7%.

Racial composition as of the 2020 census
Race	Number	Percent
White	331	70.7%
Black or African American	2	0.4%
American Indian and Alaska Native	6	1.3%
Asian	6	1.3%
Native Hawaiian and Other Pacific Islander	0	0%
Some other race	67	14.3%
Two or more races	56	12.0%
Hispanic or Latino (of any race)	143	30.6%

=== 2010 census ===
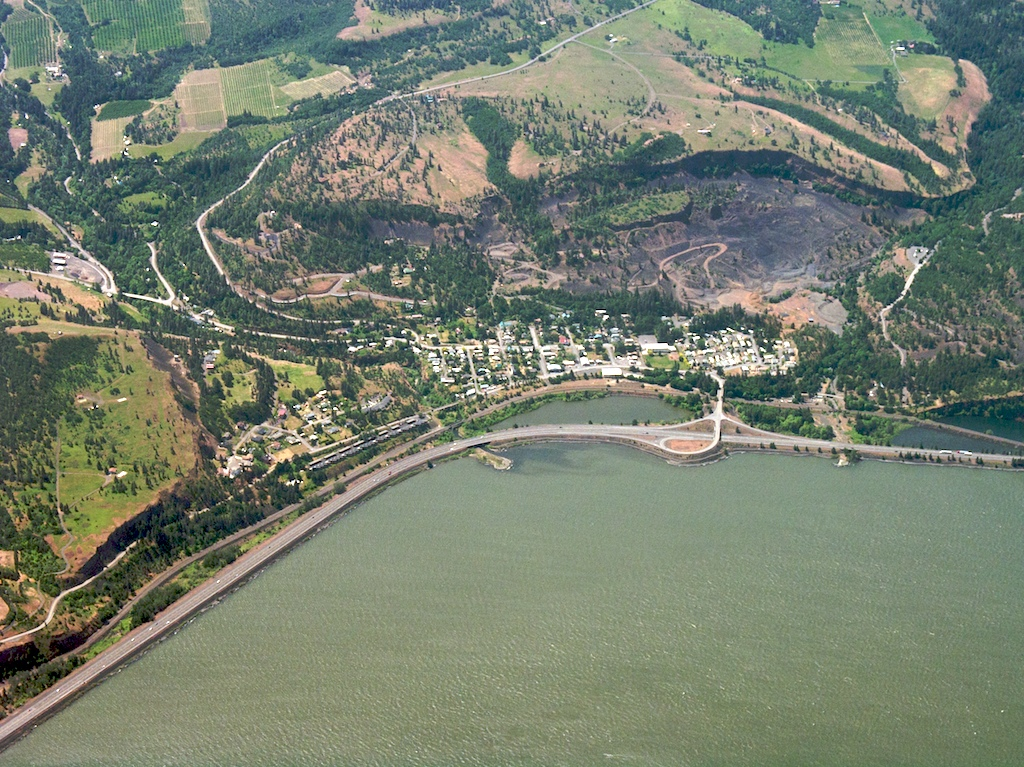
Aerial view of Mosier along the Columbia River, May 2008

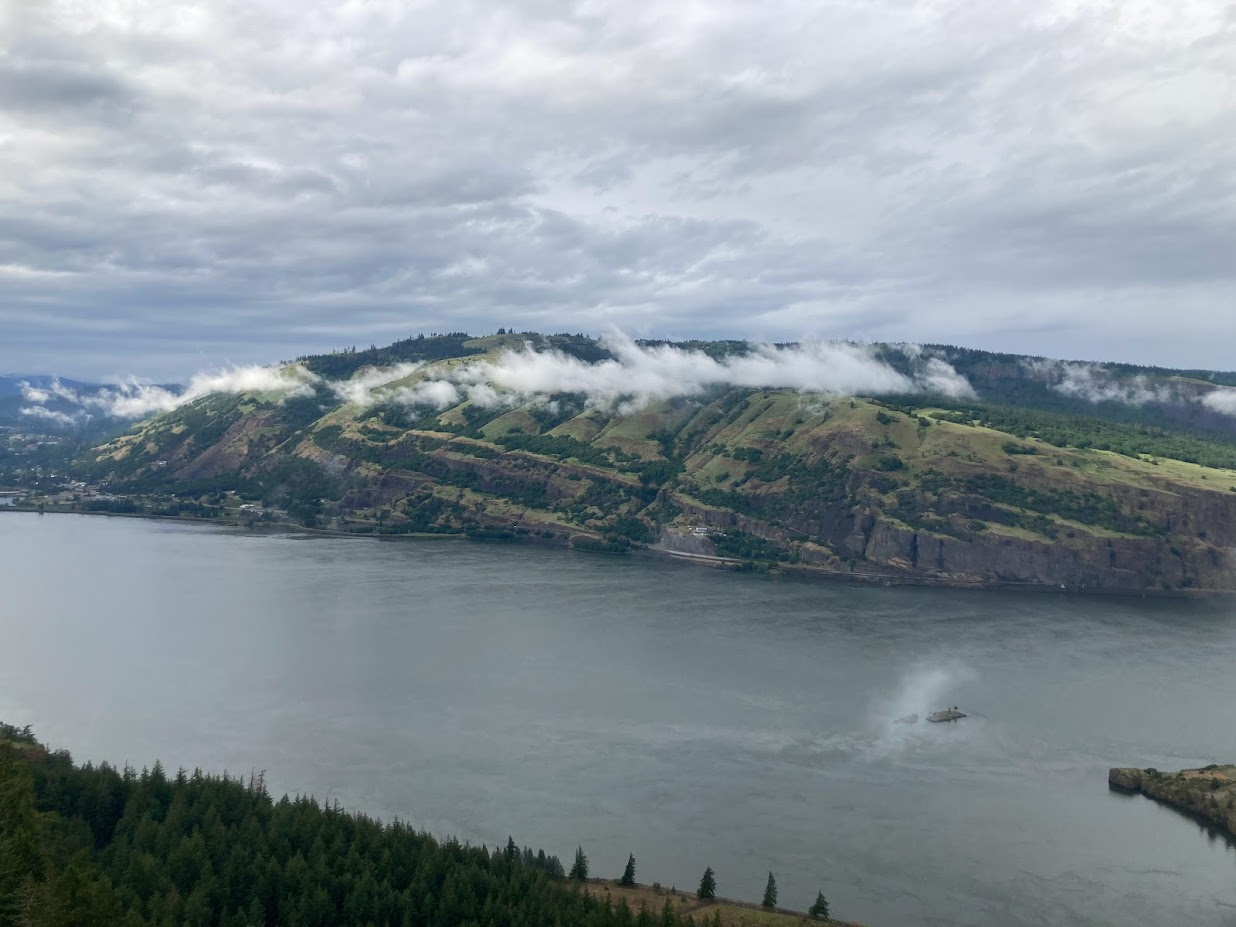
A view of the Columbia River Gorge from a viewpoint near Mosier

As of the census of 2010, there were 433 people, 203 households, and 107 families living in the city. The population density was 921.3 inhabitants per square mile (355.7/km^{2}). There were 250 housing units at an average density of 531.9 per square mile (205.4/km^{2}). The racial makeup of the city was 90.1% White, 0.2% African American, 2.3% Native American, 1.2% Asian, 0.7% Pacific Islander, 4.2% from other races, and 1.4% from two or more races. Hispanic or Latino of any race were 22.4% of the population.

There were 203 households, of which 24.1% had children under the age of 18 living with them, 37.9% were married couples living together, 10.3% had a female householder with no husband present, 4.4% had a male householder with no wife present, and 47.3% were non-families. 37.4% of all households were made up of individuals, and 11.4% had someone living alone who was 65 years of age or older. The average household size was 2.13 and the average family size was 2.83.

The median age in the city was 42.9 years. 21.7% of residents were under the age of 18; 5.5% were between the ages of 18 and 24; 26.8% were from 25 to 44; 30.1% were from 45 to 64; and 16.2% were 65 years of age or older. The gender makeup of the city was 48.5% male and 51.5% female.

=== 2000 census ===
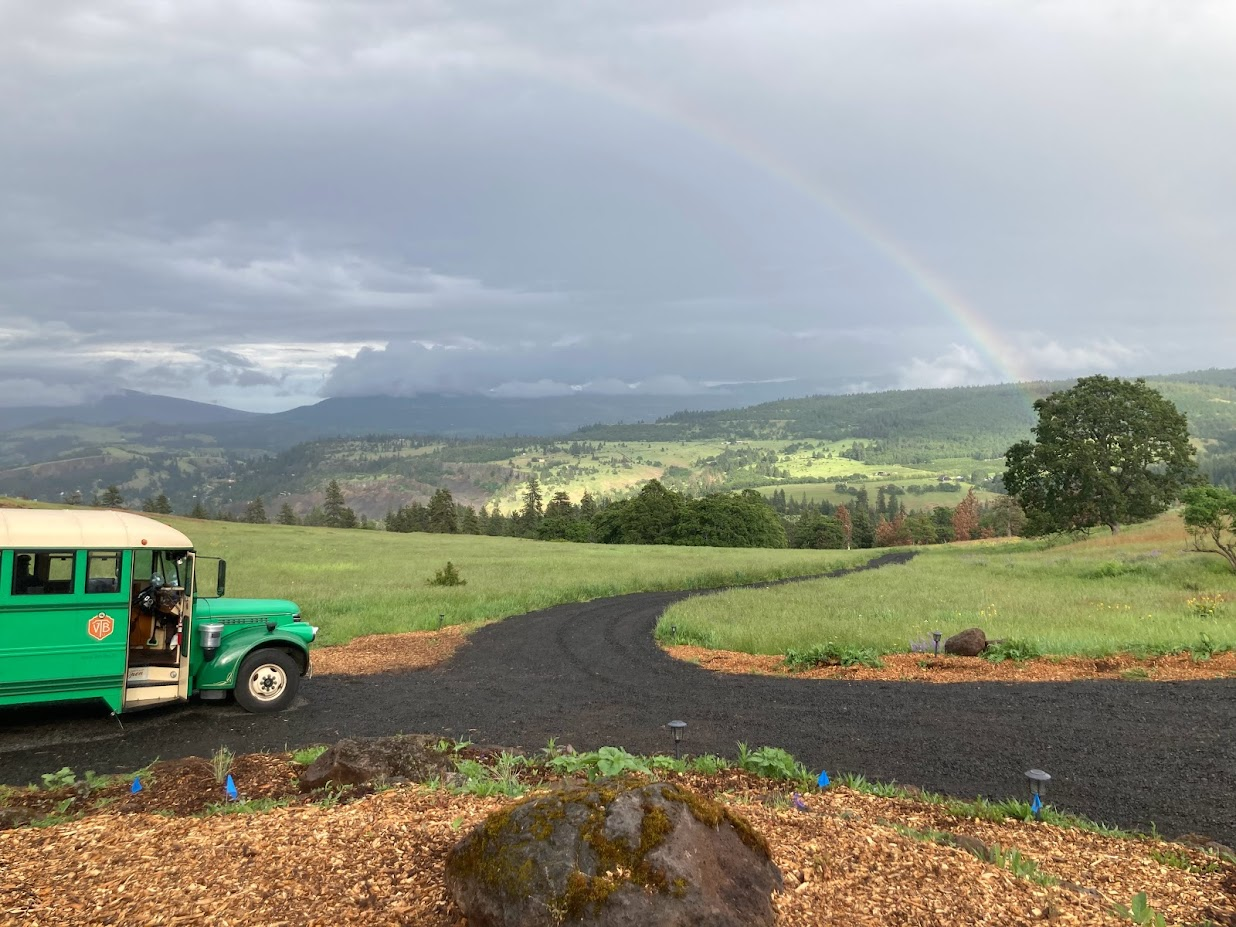
A bus sits above rolling hills near Mosier, with a rainbow above it

As of the census of 2000, there were 410 people, 164 households, and 104 families living in the city. The population density was 9.005 people per square mile (344.1/km^{2}). There were 191 housing units at an average density of 419.5 per square mile (162.0/km^{2}). The racial makeup of the city was 85.61% White, 0.49% African American, 1.46% Native American, 0.98% Pacific Islander, 8.54% from other races, and 2.93% from two or more races. Hispanic or Latino of any race were 14.15% of the population.

There were 164 households, out of which 27.4% had children under the age of 18 living with them, 51.2% were married couples living together, 11.0% had a female householder with no husband present, and 36.0% were non-families. 27.4% of all households were made up of individuals, and 8.5% had someone living alone who was 65 years of age or older. The average household size was 2.50 and the average family size was 3.06.

In the city, the population was spread out, with 25.6% under the age of 18, 6.6% from 18 to 24, 32.0% from 25 to 44, 22.2% from 45 to 64, and 13.7% who were 65 years of age or older. The median age was 37 years. For every 100 females, there were 88.9 males. For every 100 females age 18 and over, there were 90.6 males.

The median income for a household in the city was $39,028, and the median income for a family was $46,094. Males had a median income of $30,521 versus $19,000 for females. The per capita income for the city was $14,560. About 1.7% of families and 5.3% of the population were below the poverty line, including none of those under age 18 and 13.0% of those age 65 or over.

== Notable residents ==
- Jackson Graham, first general manager of the Washington Metropolitan Area Transit Authority, born in Mosier

== See also ==
- List of cities in Oregon
