= E. Hunter Harrison =

American railway executive (1944-2017)

- Born: Ewing Hunter Harrison; November 7, 1944; Memphis, Tennessee, U.S.
- Died: December 16, 2017 (aged 73); Wellington, Florida, U.S
- Occupation: Railway executive
- Years active: 1964–2017
- Spouse: Jeannie Harrison
- Children: 2

Ewing Hunter Harrison (November 7, 1944 – December 16, 2017) was a railway executive who was the CEO of Illinois Central Railroad (IC), Canadian National Railway (CN), Canadian Pacific Railway (CP), and CSX Corporation. He is known for introducing precision scheduled railroading to the companies he ran. He died on December 16, 2017, two days after taking medical leave from CSX.

== Biography ==
Born in Memphis, Tennessee, in 1944, Harrison began his railroad career in 1964 when he worked as a carman-oiler for the St. Louis-San Francisco Railway ("Frisco"), while attending Memphis State University. Harrison was later promoted to railroad operator with Frisco and, later, with Burlington Northern Railroad (BN) following that company's acquisition of Frisco in 1980.

Harrison left BN in 1989 and secured a job with the executive team at the Illinois Central Railroad (IC), first as vice-president and chief operating officer, culminating with his appointment as president and chief executive officer from 1993 to 1998. Following the acquisition of IC by CN in 1998, Harrison was appointed vice president and chief operating officer by CN. Upon the retirement of Paul Tellier, he became president and chief executive officer of CN on January 1, 2003, until his retirement on December 31, 2009.

During his time at CN, Harrison was named Railroader of the Year for 2002 by industry trade journal Railway Age as well as CEO of the Year for 2007 by The Globe and Mail's "Report on Business". On April 29, 2009, CN announced the company's plan for succession in Harrison's position by appointing Claude Mongeau as his successor effective January 1, 2010. Following his time at CN, Harrison retired to his estate in Connecticut where he raised and trained horses for show jumping. Bound by a non-competition clause with CN, Harrison maintained a low profile as a director for the Belt Railway of Chicago as well as Dynegy Holdings LLC.

In fall 2011, Harrison was approached by the hedge fund Pershing Square Capital Management led by activist investor Bill Ackman, who was undertaking a proxy battle with the board of directors of CPR. Ackman had offered at that time to appoint Harrison as president and chief executive officer of CPR should his proxy battle in spring 2012 be successful, which would necessarily result in the termination of Fred Green as president and CEO. Ackman was ultimately successful in the proxy battle at the CPR's annual shareholder meeting on May 17, 2012. On June 29, 2012, Harrison was appointed president and CEO of CPR.

CN halted nearly $40 million in benefits to be paid to Harrison after launching a lawsuit alleging he may have breached, or intended to breach, several confidentiality agreements with the railway dating back to his retirement in 2009. In the suit, CN's board of directors said it had grounds to believe Harrison may have violated his commitments to CN as part of Ackman's push to see Harrison replace Fred Green as CEO of Canadian Pacific.

On January 18, 2017, Harrison resigned as CEO of CP Ltd. to join Paul Hilal in another freight rail management restructuring initiative at CSX Corp., a US-based freight rail company. On March 7, 2017, Harrison was named CEO of CSX.

Harrison died on December 16, 2017, due to severe complications from a recent illness, two days after taking medical leave from CSX. He was 73 and survived by his wife, Jeannie, and two daughters, Elizabeth (Libby) Julo and Cayce Judge.

Preceded by Edward Moyers	President of Illinois Central Railroad; 1993 – 1998	purchase by Canadian National Railway
Preceded by Mike Haverty (ATSF, KCS)	Railroader of the Year; 2002	Succeeded by Richard K. Davidson (UP)
Preceded by Paul Tellier	President of Canadian National Railway; 2003 – 2009	Succeeded by Claude Mongeau
Preceded by Frederic J. "Fred" Green	President & CEO of Canadian Pacific; 2012 – 2017	Succeeded by Keith Creel
Preceded by Michael J. Ward	CEO of CSX Corporation; 2017	Succeeded by James M. Foote (acting)
