= Keith Creel =

Chief Executive of CPKC

- Born: 1968 (age 56–57); Alabama, United States
- Occupation: Business executive
- Years active: 1992–present
- Employer: Canadian Pacific Kansas City

Keith Creel (born 1968) is an American-Canadian business executive, and is the president and chief executive officer of Canadian Pacific Kansas City.

== Earlier career ==
Creel was born in Alabama. He served as a commissioned officer in the United States Army and took part in the Gulf War. He took a degree in marketing at Jacksonville State University. Upon graduation in 1992 he joined Burlington Northern Railroad as an operations manager, at first in Birmingham, Alabama. In 1996 he joined the Illinois Central Railroad, which later merged with Canadian National Railway (CN), and in 1999 became general manager of the Michigan Zone within the Midwest Division of Grand Trunk Western (GTW). He moved to Canada in 2002 as vice president of CN's Prairie Division in Winnipeg, and successively took the posts of senior VP of the western region, senior VP of the eastern region, executive VP (2007), and Chief Operating Officer (2010). He merged GTW and two other railroads within CN, and pursued a system of "precision railroading" using fewer trains but ensuring that they run fast and on time.

== Canadian Pacific ==
Creel moved to Canadian Pacific Railway, as President and Chief Operating Officer, in early 2013. He received the Progressive Railroading Railroad Innovator Award for 2014, in recognition of outstanding achievements in the rail industry. He deputized for Chief Executive Hunter Harrison on several occasions, and succeeded Harrison as Chief Executive in January 2017, earlier than the originally planned handover date of July 2017. As CEO he has made efforts to improve services and attract more customers, and to improve relations between company and workforce after earlier staff cuts.

In 2020, industry trade journal Railway Age named Creel Railroader of the Year for 2021 and 2022. The Canadian Pacific and Kansas City Southern Railroad (CPKC) merged in April 2023 to form the only single line rail entity connecting the US, Canada and Mexico. The success of this merger, experts say, resulted in increased compensation packages for the company’s top executives. Creel received CA$20 million making him one of the highest paid individuals in the country. Creel’s base salary was CA$1.8 million ; the remainder was in share-based, option based and other reward incentives.
