= Precision railroading =

Freight railroad operations approach

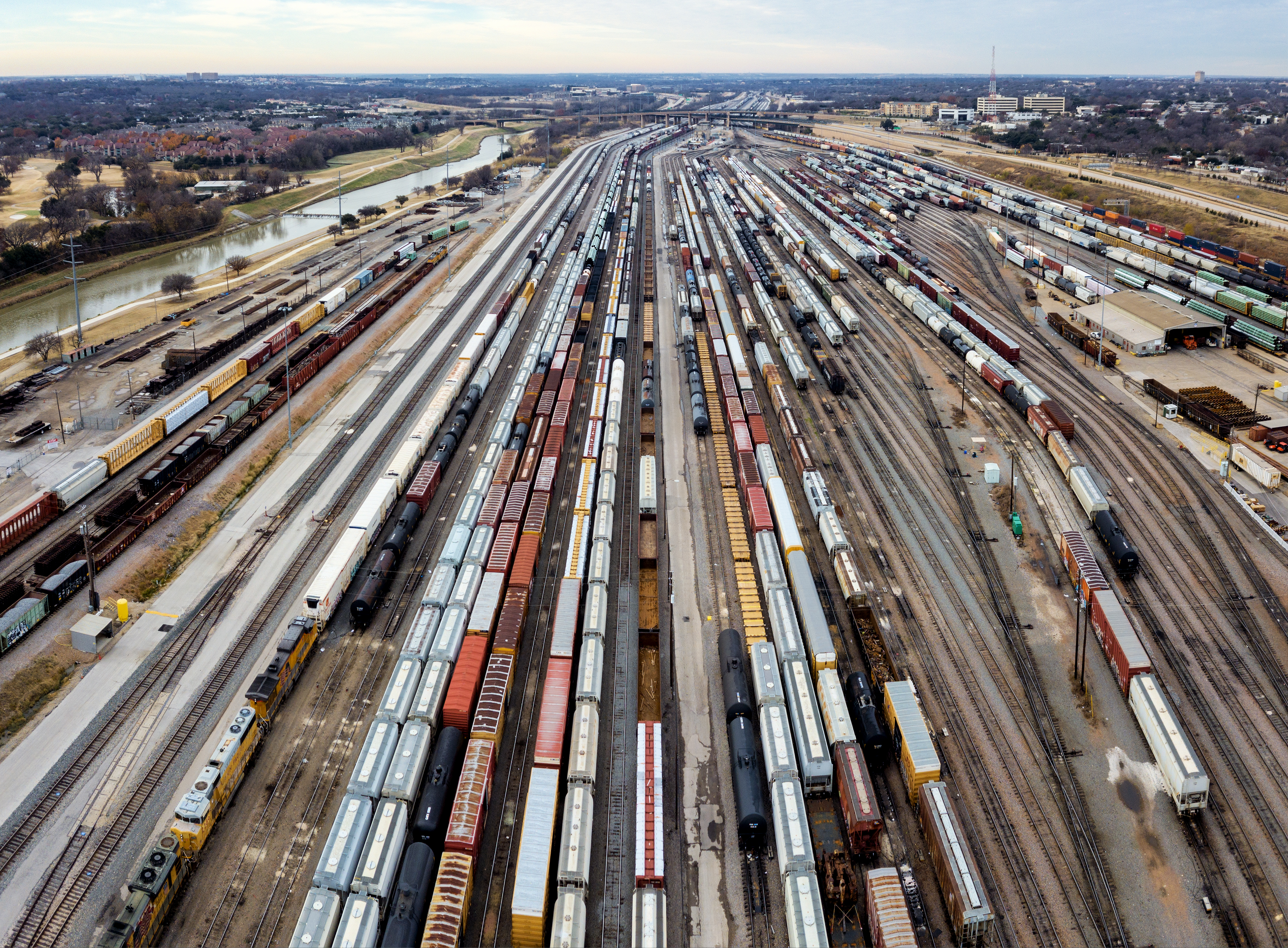
Precision railroading attempts to minimize the number of times on each journey a freight car must be sorted in classification yards such as this one in Fort Worth, Texas.

Precision railroading or precision scheduled railroading (PSR) is a concept in freight railroad operations pioneered by American railroad executive E. Hunter Harrison in 1993 and has since been adopted by nearly every North American Class I railroad. It shifts the focus from older practices, such as unit trains, hub and spoke operations, and individual car switching at hump yards to emphasizing point-to-point freight car movements on simplified routing networks. Under PSR, freight trains operate on fixed schedules, much like passenger trains, instead of being dispatched whenever a sufficient number of loaded cars are available. In the past, intermodal trains and general merchandise trains operated separately; under PSR they are combined as needed, typically with distributed power. Inventories of freight cars and locomotives are reduced and fewer workers are employed for a given level of traffic. The result is an often substantial decrease in railroad operating ratios and other financial and operating metrics at the cost of less-reliable service (particularly to smaller customers), long-term capacity issues, and possibly increased derailments and other safety risks associated with longer trains and crew fatigue.

== History ==
Harrison first introduced PSR at the Illinois Central Railroad (IC), where he became CEO in 1993. He implemented it at Canadian National after they acquired IC in 1998. After retiring from Canadian National, Harrison was recruited to take over leadership of the Canadian Pacific and implemented precision railroading there. In March 2017, he was appointed CEO of CSX Transportation and began implementing PSR on its large network, but died eight months later.

== Criticism ==
Precision railroading has been criticized on many fronts. Shippers complain about poorer service and delays. Railroad workers have raised concerns about safety due to reduced inspections and staffing. Under PSR, service is typically eliminated on shipping lanes and origin-destination pairs that have low traffic levels. Intermodal terminals have been consolidated, with the railroad relying on trucks for the last hundred miles. Fewer workers are needed, even with higher traffic volumes. As a result, over 20,000 railroad workers were laid off in 2019. The Surface Transportation Board estimates large freight carriers employed 30% fewer workers in 2022 as compared to 2018.

PSR advocates claim that shippers benefit in the long run from reduced costs and more reliable schedules. However, PSR has been criticized as being focused on short-term financial benefits at the expense of long-term capacity. In particular, precision scheduled railroading is impacting safety due to increased train length, up to three miles (5,000 meters) in many cases. This leads to a higher risk of derailments as well as crew stress and fatigue due to the difficulty of operating trains of this length, for which the North American railroad network was not necessarily designed.
