= Manitou, North Dakota =

Unincorporated community in North Dakota, U.S.

Coordinates: 48°19′52″N 102°38′12″W

Manitou is an unincorporated community in Mountrail County, in the U.S. state of North Dakota.

== History ==
Manitou was laid out in 1887 when the railroad was extended to that point. A post office called Manitou was in operation from 1905 until 1941.
