= Sadek Hilal =

Columbia University radiologist

Doctor Sadek Kamel Hilal
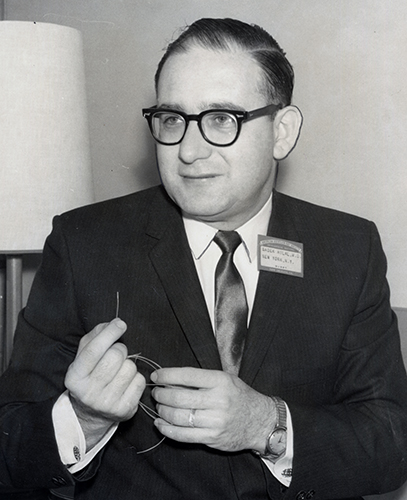
- Born: 1930; Cairo, Egypt
- Died: December 24, 2000 (aged 69–70); Englewood Cliffs, New Jersey, US
- Citizenship: Egypt
- Education: MD, Cairo University Medical School; PhD, radiology, University of Minnesota
- Occupations: Radiology practitioner; Lecturer and head of radiology department at Columbia
- Known for: Embolization of blood vessels in the brain;
- Title: Director of Radiology, Columbia University Medical Center; Professor of radiology and neurological surgery at the Columbia College of Physicians and Surgeons
- Spouse: Cynthia
- Children: 4, including Peter

Sadek Kamil Hilal (1930, Cairo – 2000, New Jersey, sometimes Sadek Kamel Hilal) was an Egyptian-American Columbia University radiologist and one of the most influential researchers in advancing imaging science and radiology in the twentieth century.

== Early life and education ==
Sadek Kamil Hilal was born in Cairo, Egypt, to Dr. Kamel Boutros Hilal, MD and Alice-Helene Joseph Kanawaty. He was baptized "Peter" in honor of his grandfather, Boutros Ibrahim Hilal. He had three brothers, Ghanem, Adel, and Fayiz, and a sister Hoda. The family was Christian.

Sadek was born into a medical family with a tradition of community service. His father, Dr. Kamil Boutros Hilal, was part of a humanitarian mission sent to Adana, Turkey during the Adana Massacres of Armenian Christians in 1909, and was a founding member of the Alumni Association of the American University of Beirut Medical School. Sadek followed his father's footsteps into a medical career.

He attended the French Jesuit College de Sainte Familie in Cairo for his primary and secondary education, and received his Medical Degree from Cairo University. While attending Cairo University, Sadek had to hide his Christianity from his professors by omitting his grandfather's name and using his great-grandfather's instead; going by Sadek Kamil Ibrahim Hilal rather than Sadek Kamil Boutros Hilal. As fair, blue-eyed Christians of Syrian and Lebanese descent, the family faced regular discrimination from Egyptian society and institutions. When the Egyptian government of Gamal Abdul Nasser began persecuting Christians in the late 1950s, the family decided to fulfill their late father Kamel's dream of immigrating to the United States.

Sadek arrived in the United States first, and was accepted into the radiology Ph.D. program at the University of Minnesota. Brothers Ghanem "George", Adel "Marc", and Fayiz; sister Hoda "Mimi", and mother Alice joined Sadek in Minnesota after short stays in Brooklyn and Endicott, NY. Adel and Fayiz joined Sadek in studying at the University of Minnesota, where Adel earned a Master of Electrical Engineering and Fayiz earned a Bachelor of Mechanical Engineering. Ghanem and Marc spent their careers working for IBM, Control Data Systems, and Honeywell and its successor companies: Alliant TechSystems and Orbital ATK. Fayiz was a businessman and philanthropist, founder of Cetek Technologies, a high-tech ceramics manufacturer. Hoda was a master Librarian in Greenwich, CT.

Dr. Hilal married Cynthia on June 28, 1964. She was a guidance counselor at a parochial school in Brooklyn. They had three sons and a daughter, and lived in Englewood Cliffs, New Jersey. The children are Paul, Philip, and twins, Drs. Peter Hilal and Diane Hilal Campo. Kamil, sometimes spelled Kamel, is a patronymic middle name. An Arabic speaker understands "Sadek Kamil Hilal" to mean "Sadek, son of Kamil Hilal".

== Career ==
He received his medical degree from the Cairo University School of Medicine in 1955 and earned a doctorate in radiology from the University of Minnesota in 1962. His thesis entitled, The Measurement of Blood Flow by Radiologic Technique, became one of the most frequently cited references in the field, according to the journal Radiology.

Columbia University recruited him in 1963 as an assistant professor and assisting attending radiologist. He then became the director of Columbia's division of radiology and was a professor of radiology and neurological surgery at the College of Physicians and Surgeons from 1979 until his emeritus status four years before his death. At his death in 2000, age 70, he was president of the International Society of Neuroradiology, a position he held since 1998.

In 1968, he developed the technique of embolization, a way to treat malformations of blood vessels in the brain by injecting substances to occlude them. This step is considered pivotal in the history of interventional radiology. The findings were published in 1975 in the Journal of Neurosurgery.
