= William W. Stinson =

Canadian railway executive (1933–2026)

William W. Stinson (November 29, 1933 – May 1, 2026) was a Canadian railway executive who was the chairman and chief executive officer of Canadian Pacific Railway and chairman of Sun Life Financial. He was educated at the University of Toronto Schools, Trinity College at the University of Toronto, and the University of Western Ontario. As of 2008, he was the chairman and president of Westshore Terminals. At the time of his promotion to the office of CEO at Canadian Pacific in 1985, after working for the railway since 1955, he was the youngest CEO in the railway's history.

Stinson died on May 1, 2026, at the age of 92.

Business positions
Preceded by Frederick Stewart "Fred" Burbidge	President of Canadian Pacific Railway Limited; 1981 – 1996	Succeeded by David P. O'Brien
