= Ian David Sinclair =

Canadian politician and businessman

The Honourable Ian David Sinclair OC QC

Canadian Senator from Ontario
- In office 1983–1988
- Appointed by: Pierre Trudeau

Personal details
- Born: December 27, 1913 Winnipeg, Manitoba, Canada
- Died: April 7, 2006 (aged 92) Oakville, Ontario, Canada
- Party: Liberal
- Committees: Chair, Standing Committee on Banking, Trade and Commerce (1986-1988)

Ian David Sinclair, OC QC (December 27, 1913 – April 7, 2006) was a Canadian lawyer, businessman, and senator.

== Biography ==
He was born in Winnipeg, Manitoba, and received a Bachelor of Arts degree in economics in 1937 from the University of Manitoba and a Bachelor of Law degree from the Manitoba Law School in 1941.

Sinclair was called to the Bar of Manitoba in 1941. From 1942 to 1943, he was a lecturer in torts at the University of Manitoba.

In 1942, he started at Canadian Pacific Ltd. in the law department as an assistant solicitor and eventually rose to become president and CEO in 1969. He was also Chairman and CEO from 1972 to 1981. While president, Sinclair assisted Father David Bauer and the Canada men's national ice hockey team by arranging free and discounted transportation for the team.

In 1983, he was summoned to the Senate of Canada and represented the senatorial division of Halton, Ontario. A Liberal, he retired on September 27, 1988.

In 1979, he was made an Officer of the Order of Canada "for his contribution to the commercial development of Canada." He was also inducted into the Canadian Business Hall of Fame.

He and his wife, Ruth, had four children.

In the late 1970s, he was the subject of the television documentary "Best Job in Canada" in which he disclosed that his weekly salary was $10,700. One of his more colourful quotes in the program was "I don't have heart attacks, I give them."

Business positions
| Preceded by Robert A. "Bob" Emerson | President of Canadian Pacific Railway Limited; 1969–1981 | Succeeded by Fred Burbidge |
