= Citicorp Railmark Inc. (Citirail) =

Locomotive leasing company based in Chicago, US

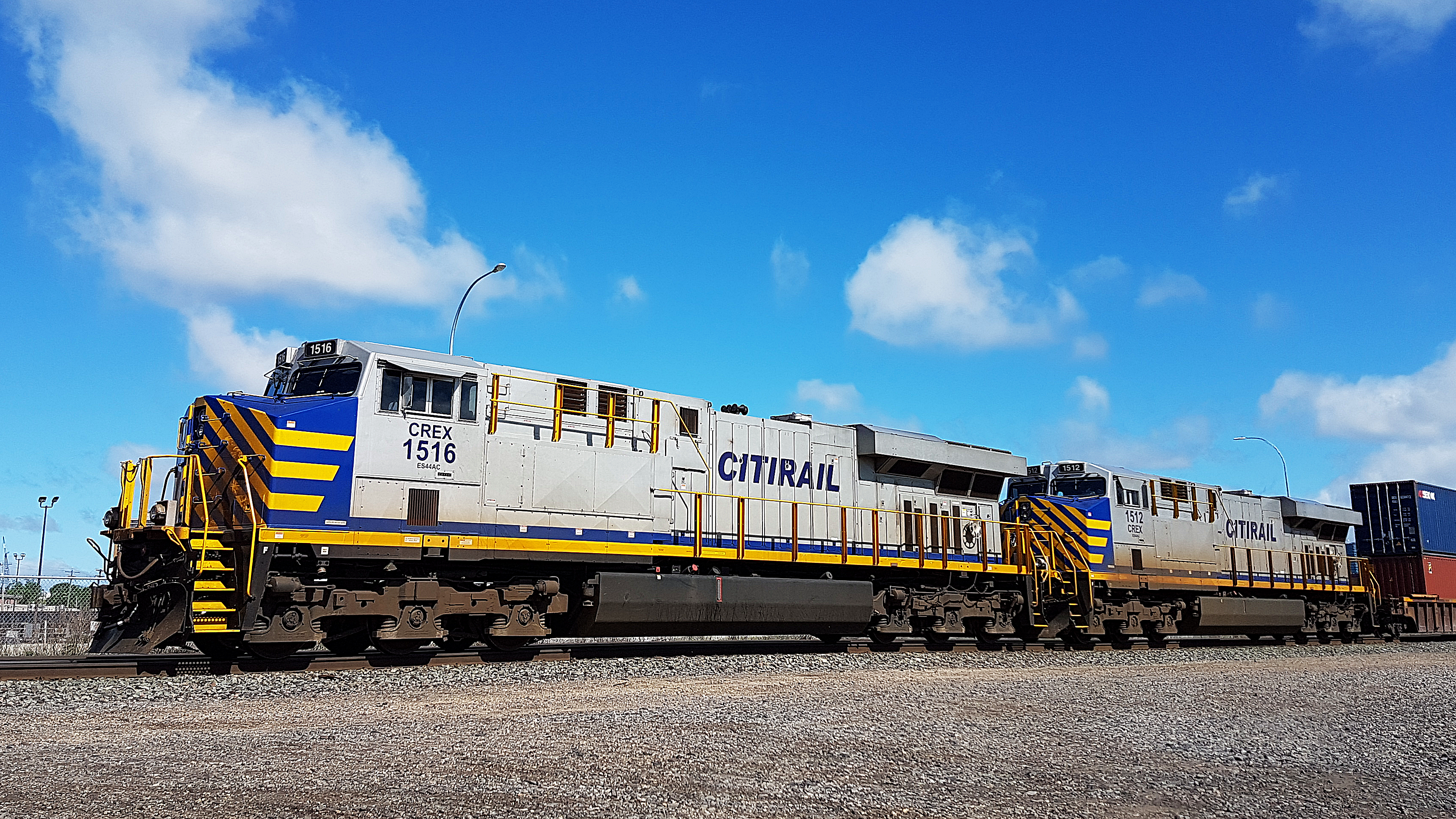
- Citirail locomotives pulling an intermodal train out of Winnipeg
- Trade name: Citirail Express
- Formerly: Citicorp Aerolease
- Company type: Subsidiary
- Industry: Locomotive leasing
- Founded: 13 May 1970
- Headquarters: Chicago, Illinois, United States
- Parent: Citibank

Citicorp Railmark Inc. (trading as Citirail Express) (reporting mark CREX) is a company that leases locomotives to railroads as needed. The company is a subsidiary of Citibank, which itself is a division of Citigroup. It was formerly known as Citicorp Aerolease, and was first formed on May 13, 1970.

== Locomotives ==
Citirail previously owned a fleet of 167 locomotives, but now only retains one unit. The remainder were sold or leased, as detailed below:

Model	Quantity	Numbers	Notes
GE ES44AC	15	1201–1215	Built 2012. All sold to CN.
GE ES44AC	50	1301–1350	Built 2013. All sold to CN. Unit 1331 was wrecked and retired.
GE ES44AC	35	1401–1435	Built 2014. All sold to CN.
GE ES44AC	25	1501–1525	Built 2015. All sold to CN except 1504–1505, which went to ArcelorMittal Liberia. These are Tier 4 credit units.
EMD SD40-2	1	6214	—
GE C40-8	41	2026, 9023–9037, 9039–9048, 9050–9064	Ex-Union Pacific Railroad, originally C&NW. Unit 9049 was renumbered to 2026. All sold to CN.
