= 21st Century Steam =

American steam locomotive program (2011–2015)

21st Century Steam was an initiative of the Norfolk Southern Railway: from 2011 to 2015, the company used four steam locomotives to pull passenger excursions along its tracks in the eastern United States.

== Background ==
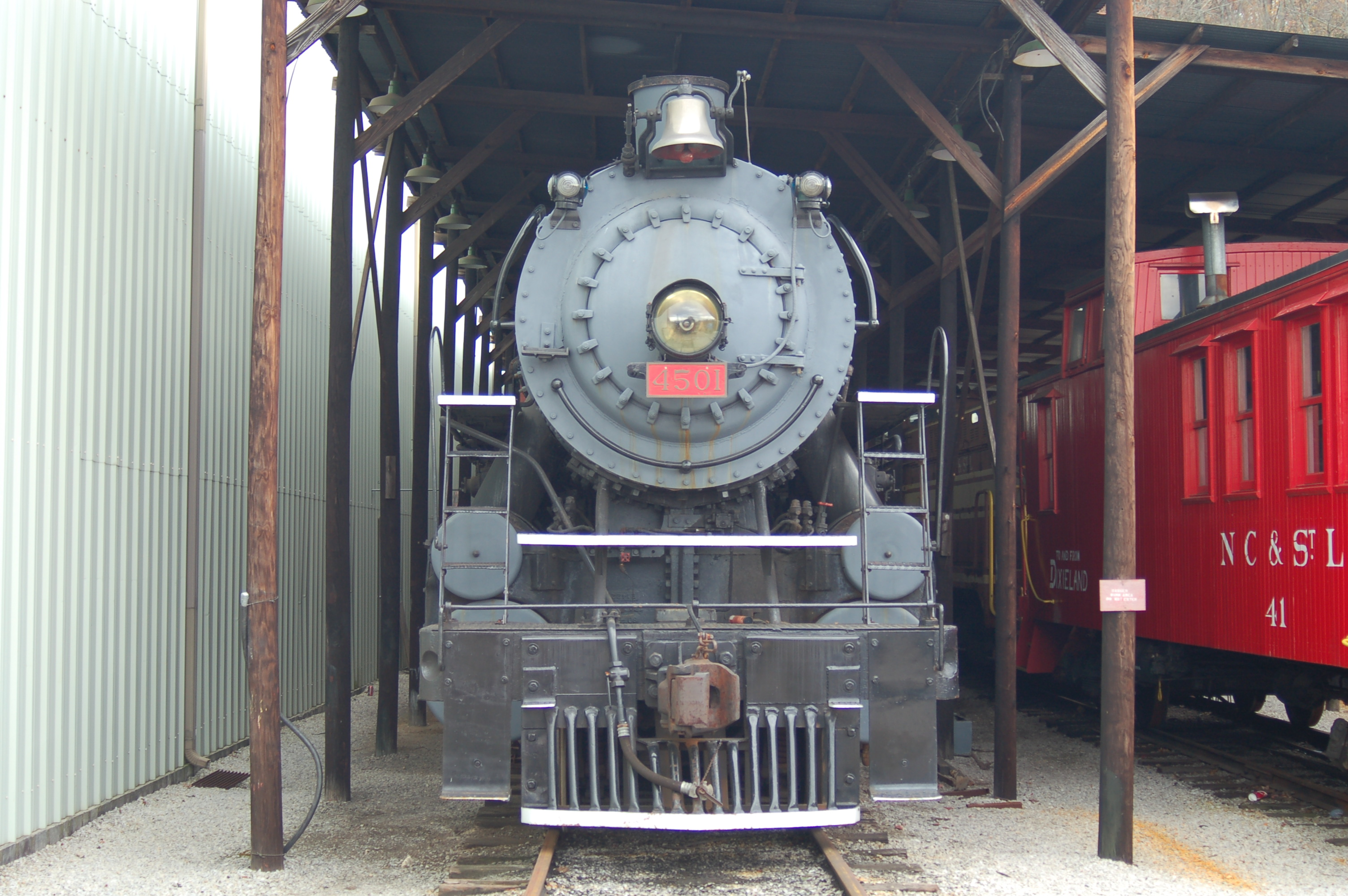
SOU 4501

In 1966, the Southern Railway, under the leadership of W. Graham Claytor, Jr., operated a popular steam excursion program. The program operated some locomotives that had run on Southern rails— Southern Railway 630, Southern Railway 722, Southern Railway 4501, and Savannah & Atlanta 750—and leased others, such as Canadian Pacific 2839, Chesapeake and Ohio 2716 and Texas and Pacific 610. When the Southern Railway merged in 1982 with the Norfolk & Western Railway to become Norfolk Southern, the steam program was retained by NS chairman and CEO Robert B. Claytor, Graham's brother. The Norfolk Southern steam program added two locomotives: Norfolk & Western 611, which debuted in 1982, and Norfolk & Western 1218, which debuted in 1987.

In 1994, Norfolk Southern announced that it would end the steam program due to safety concerns, rising insurance costs, the expense of maintaining steam locomotives, and decreasing rail network availability due to a surge in freight traffic. At the time, N&W 1218 was being overhauled in Birmingham, Alabama, so it was cosmetically restored and eventually was sent back to Roanoke, Virginia. Meanwhile, N&W 611 pulled its final excursion from Birmingham to Chattanooga, Tennessee, on December 3 and arrived back in Roanoke four days later. N&W 611 and 1218 were later displayed at the Virginia Museum of Transportation in Roanoke. In May 2014, the 611 was towed to the North Carolina Transportation Museum in Spencer, North Carolina, to be restored to operating condition.

=== Origins ===
In 2007, Norfolk Southern CEO Charles "Wick" Moorman spoke at a gathering of the National Railway Historical Society in Chattanooga. While there, Moorman toured the Tennessee Valley Railroad Museum, traveled on one of TVRM's excursions, and met with TVRM president Tim Andrews. Andrews recalled later: “I told [Moorman] that we would be happy to do whatever we could to help Norfolk Southern with anything they needed.... It was an open-ended conversation, and talk about reintroducing steam developed from there.”

In June 2010, Norfolk Southern announced that it was talking with the TVRM to operate a “limited number” of steam-drawn excursions, saying the program would “highlight milestones in rail history and provide an opportunity for audiences to learn about today's safe and service-oriented freight railroads.” Moorman said, "This is the right time for steam to ride the Norfolk Southern rails...We have a fascinating history, and we have a compelling message about how today's railroads support jobs, competition, and the economy. It is a forward-looking message that resonates with people everywhere."

== Excursion seasons ==
=== 2011 ===
In March 2011, the restoration of Southern 630 was complete. Over Labor Day weekend, the 630 rolled onto the main line to participate the 21st Century Steam program, pulling two trains daily on September 3 and 4 from the TVRM to one of the train yards in Chattanooga and returning, an event coinciding with the 50th anniversary of the founding of the Museum. Two months later, 630 ran an excursion from Knoxville, Tennessee, to Chattanooga.

=== 2012 ===
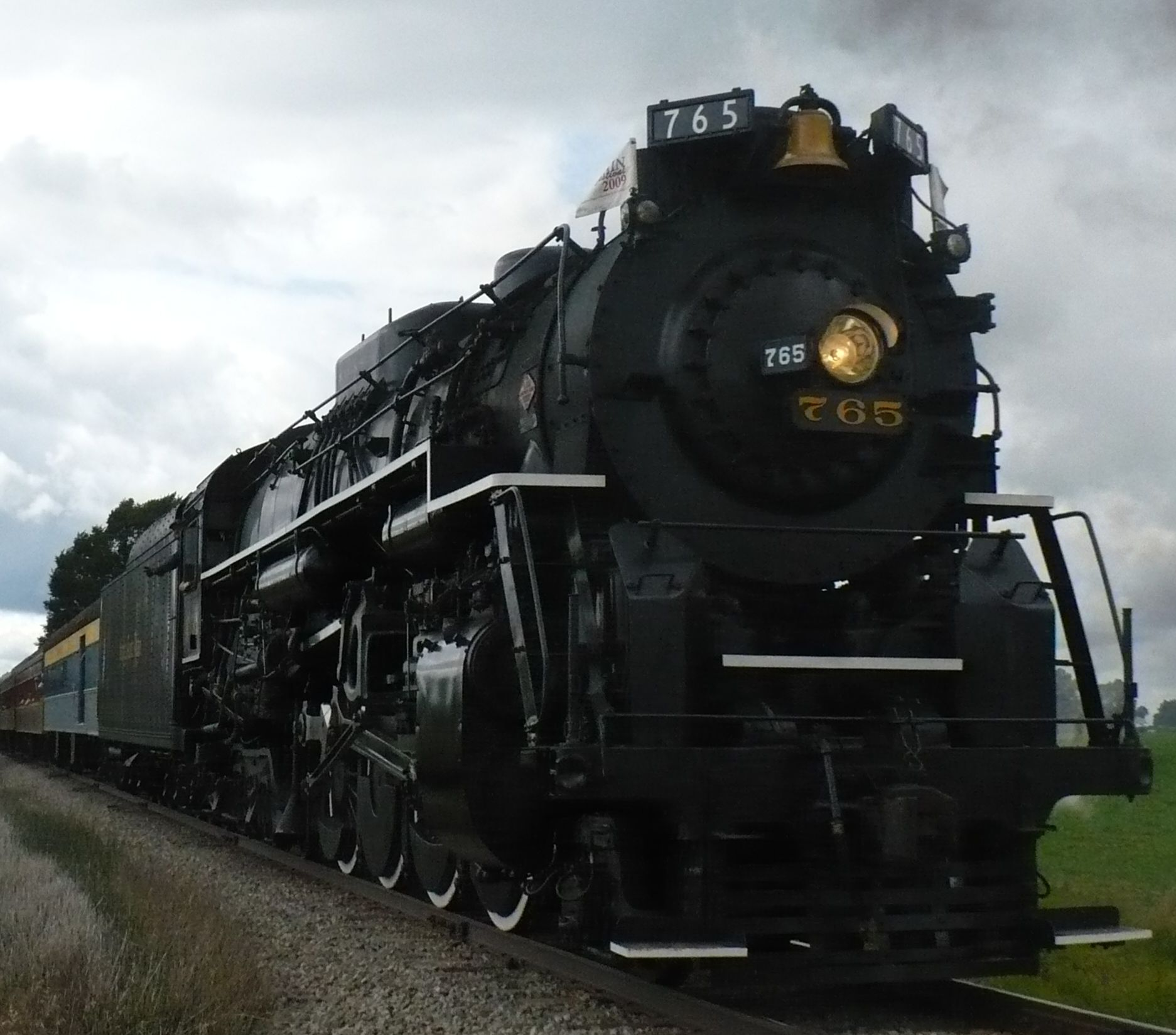
NKP 765

In 2012, the 21st Century Steam excursion program mostly pulled relatively short employee-appreciation excursions to commemorate the 30th anniversary of the Norfolk Southern merger. To help Southern 630, the railroad leased the Nickel Plate 765, operated by the Fort Wayne Railroad Historical Society.

In June 2012, Southern 630 ran employee excursions around Atlanta, Georgia; Spencer, North Carolina and Winston-Salem, North Carolina; Roanoke; and Knoxville. Public one-way excursion trips included Winston-Salem to Roanoke, Roanoke to Bristol, Virginia, and Bristol to Knoxville in July. During TVRM's 2012 "Railfest" on September 1 and 2, Southern 630 pulled excursions from Chattanooga to Cleveland, Tennessee, and at the end of the month excursions in the Birmingham area. To finish out the season, on November 10, there was an excursion from Chattanooga to Attalla, Alabama, and on the 11th, an excursion from Chattanooga to Harriman, Tennessee.

Meanwhile, as Southern 630 traveled throughout the South, Nickel Plate Road 765, along with NS 8100 (the Nickel Plate Road heritage unit), pulled employee excursions in the areas around Toledo, Ohio; Bellevue, Ohio; Williamson, West Virginia; Pittsburgh, Pennsylvania; and Harrisburg, Pennsylvania. The locomotive also made a ferry run over the Horseshoe Curve near Altoona, Pennsylvania. In September, NKP 765 pulled excursions in the St. Louis area with NS 1070, the Wabash Railroad heritage unit; and NS 1072, the Illinois Terminal Railroad heritage unit.

=== 2013 ===
Southern 630's 2013 excursion season began early, with the locomotive pulling a 13-car public excursion (with the help of two diesel locomotives) from Chattanooga to Attalla on March 2. Other March excursions ran in the areas surrounding Bristol, Virginia (Bristol to Radford, Virginia, on March 9 and Bristol to Bulls Gap, Tennessee, on March 10), Roanoke (Roanoke to Walton Furnace, Virginia, on March 16 and Roanoke to Lynchburg, Virginia, on March 16–17), and Norfolk, Virginia (Norfolk to Petersburg, Virginia, on March 23). In April, the locomotive traveled to North Carolina for excursions in Spencer, North Carolina (Spencer to Barber Junction, North Carolina on April 13) and Asheville, North Carolina (Asheville to Old Fort, North Carolina, on April 20–21).

On May 11, Nickel Plate Road 765 and NS 8102 (the Pennsylvania Railroad heritage unit) pulled an employee excursion from Cleveland to Lorain, Ohio, and the “Nickel Plate Limited,” a public excursion from Rocky River to Bellevue, Ohio, the next day. She then did a ferry run to Pennsylvania in order to pull employee excursions from Altoona to Gallitzin, Pennsylvania, on May 18–19 and over Memorial Day Weekend (May 25–27), went with 765, along with NS 8102 and 8098 (the Conrail heritage unit), to pull the “Horseshoe Curve Special,” a public excursion over Horseshoe Curve between Lewistown, Pennsylvania and Gallitzin.

In the first weekend in September 2013, Southern 630 pulled excursion trains between Chattanooga and Cleveland for TVRM's Railfest, along with excursions from Birmingham to the cities of Parrish and Wilton, Alabama later in the month. On August 16, 2013, the Fort Wayne Railroad Historical Society announced plans to operate a late October excursion with Nickel Plate Road 765 between Fort Wayne, Indiana and West Lafayette, Indiana along tracks once owned by the Wabash Railroad and used by their Cannon Ball service (named after the famed song), which ran between Detroit and St. Louis between 1949 and 1971. This 225 miles (362 km) round-trip excursion is the first excursion with 765 out of Fort Wayne since 1993. In November, Southern 630 pulled from Chattanooga to Harriman and Attalla, as well as an excursion between Chattanooga and Asheville, North Carolina.

=== 2014 ===
On April 5, SOU 630 ran the "Radford Rambler" excursion round-trip between Bristol, Virginia, and Radford, Virginia, and the "Lonesome Pine Special" excursion round-trip from Bristol to Bulls Gap, Tennessee, on April 6. After that, the locomotive would operate the "Tri-County Mountaineer" from Grundy, VA to Devon, WV on April 12, 13, and 19.

On May 3 and 4, NKP 765 pulled the "Commodore Vanderbilt" employee special excursion between Elkhart, Indiana and Bryan, Ohio. Then, the locomotive would run another employee special excursion called the "Nickel Plate Limited" from Chicago, Illinois, to Argos, Indiana, on May 10 and 11.

On May 17 and 18, SOU 630 ran the "New Royal Palm" excursion from Cincinnati, Ohio, to Danville, Kentucky. The 630 ran the "Lexington Limited" excursion from Lexington, Kentucky, to Oneida, Tennessee, on May 31 and June 1 along with the Steam Anniversary Special from Chattanooga to Oneida on June 7.

On July 5 and 6, NKP 765 ran Norfolk Southern's employee special called the "Mercury Express" from Detroit, Michigan to Toledo, Ohio, and the "Detroit Arrow" public excursion from Detroit to Fort Wayne, Indiana.

=== 2015 ===
The newly restored N&W No. 611 pulled several summertime excursions in Virginia, including "The American" from Manassas to Front Royal on June 6 and 7; "The Cavalier" from Lynchburg to Petersburg on June 13 and 14; and "The Powhatan Arrow" from Roanoke to Lynchburg and "The Pelican" from Roanoke to Radford on July 3, 4, and 5.

On June 26, Southern 4501 pulled the "Radford Rambler" excursion from Bristol to Radford, Virginia. On June 27, the locomotive pulled the "Lonesome Pine Special" excursion from Bristol, Tennessee, to Bulls Gap, Tennessee; the following day, it pulled the "Radford Rambler" excursion again.

On July 18 and 19, Nickel Plate Road 765 made its first 2015 excursion run from Fort Wayne to Lafayette, Indiana, on the route of the Wabash Cannonball. On July 25 and 26, the locomotive ran from Youngstown to Ashtabula, Ohio. It returned to Buffalo, New York, for the first time in almost 40 years with August 1 and 2 run between Buffalo and Corning.

On August 22 and 23, NKP 765 pulled the "Lehigh Gorge Special" excursion from Allentown to Pittston, and back. On August 24, the locomotive visited Steamtown National Historic Site; it pulled Steamtown's round-trip excursion from Scranton to Portland, Pennsylvania, on September 5 and 7 during the site's 2015 Railfest.

On September 12 and 13, 4501 pulled an excursion from Chattanooga to Cleveland during TVRM's 2015 Railfest. On September 26 and 27, the locomotive pulled the "Nancy Hanks Special" excursion from Macon to Tennille, Georgia. No. 4501's Piedmont Limited excursion trip from Atlanta to Toccoa, Georgia, scheduled for October 3 and 4, was cancelled on October 2 due to Hurricane Joaquin.

== Bibliography ==
- Wrinn, Jim (2000), Steam's Camelot: Southern and Norfolk Southern Excursions in Color (1st ed.), TLC Publishing, ISBN 1-883089-56-5
