= Conway Yard =

Rail yard in Pennsylvania, US

Coordinates: 40.67°N 80.248°W

Conway Yard (also known as Conway Terminal) is a major rail yard located in the boroughs of Conway, Pennsylvania, and Freedom, Pennsylvania, 22 miles (35 km) northwest of Pittsburgh, Pennsylvania, along the Ohio River. It was the largest freight yard in the world from 1956 until 1980. It is currently owned by Norfolk Southern (NS) and is one of the largest yards in the United States and on the east coast.

== History ==
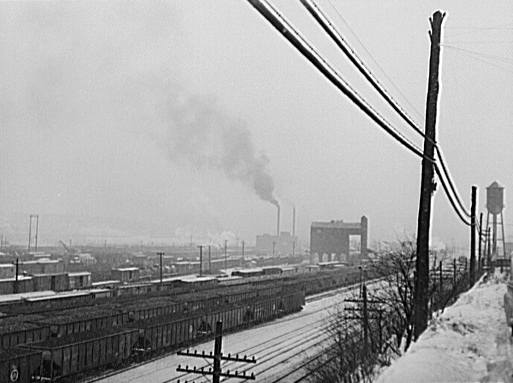
Conway Yard in 1941

Conway Yard was built in 1884 by the Pittsburgh, Fort Wayne and Chicago Railway, a subsidiary of the Pennsylvania Railroad (PRR). It was expanded in the early 20th century. In 1905, it had a capacity of 8,967 cars and typically processed 2,300 cars per day. The enlargement yard was part of a major PRR expansion that also added the Pennsylvania yards of Altoona Yard in Altoona, Pennsylvania, Enola Yard in Enola, Pennsylvania, and Harrisburg Yard in Harrisburg, Pennsylvania.

In 1953, the PRR began a $35 million ($411.3 million today) renovation and expansion of the yard. The new eastbound yard opened in 1956, while the rebuilt westbound facilities opened in stages during 1957 and 1958. Its new capacity was 9,000 cars per day, surpassing Enola Yard as the largest in the United States. Many yards (Dewitt and Clearing Yard, to name just a couple) had larger yards up until 1956. Conway was rebuilt with eastbound and westbound hump classification yards, and a total of 99 classification tracks, according to a 1957 PRR publication. A 1958 publication describes a total of 107 classification tracks. The westbound hump yard was outfitted with an automatic control system called VELAC, which was designed and installed by the Union Switch and Signal Company. It was described as the "world's largest push-button yard." The eastbound hump yard was installed with semi-automatic operation. A terminal for transferring coal from river barges to rail cars was located at the south end of the yard.

== Current operation ==
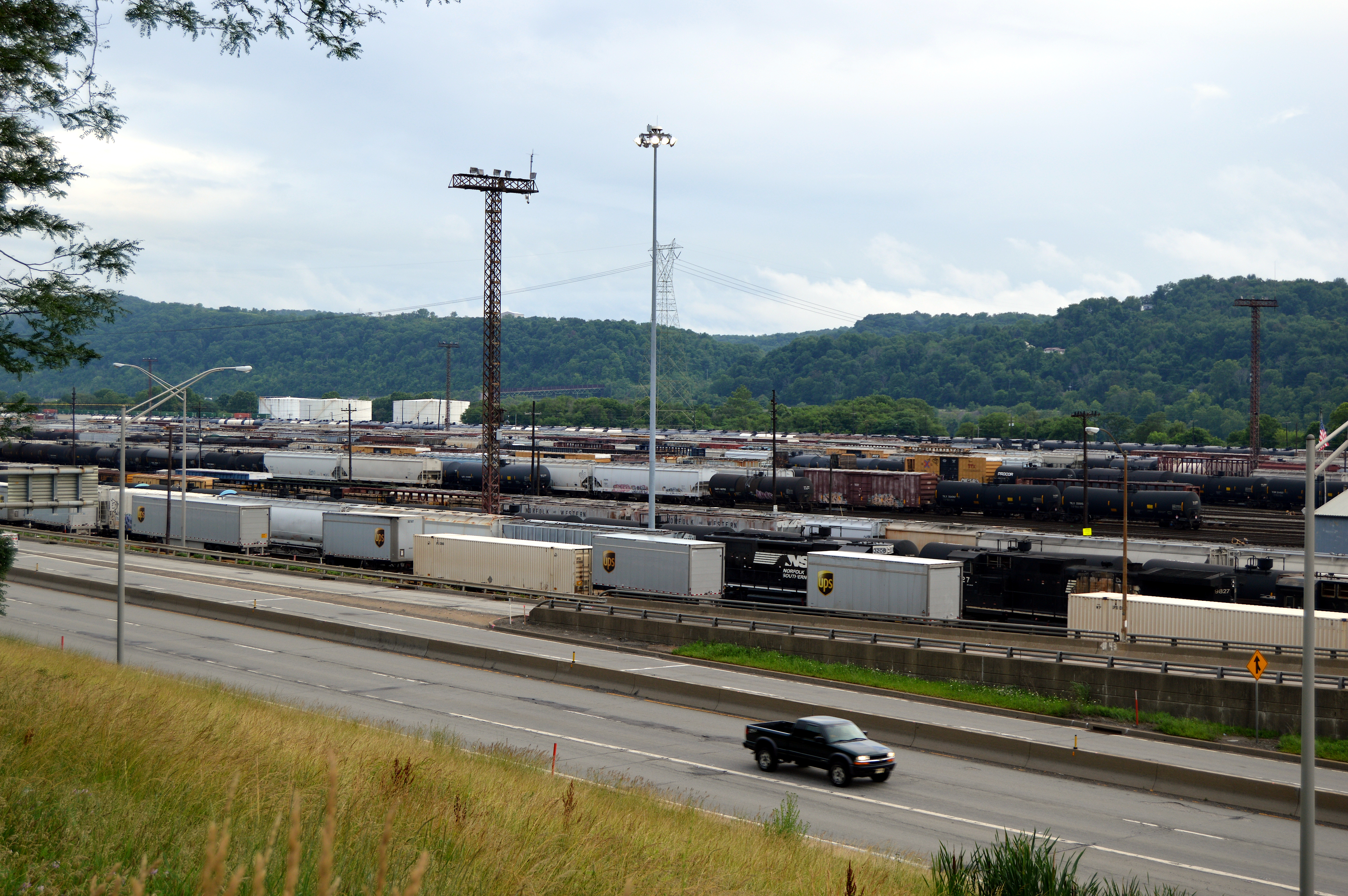
Overview from a Freedom residential neighborhood

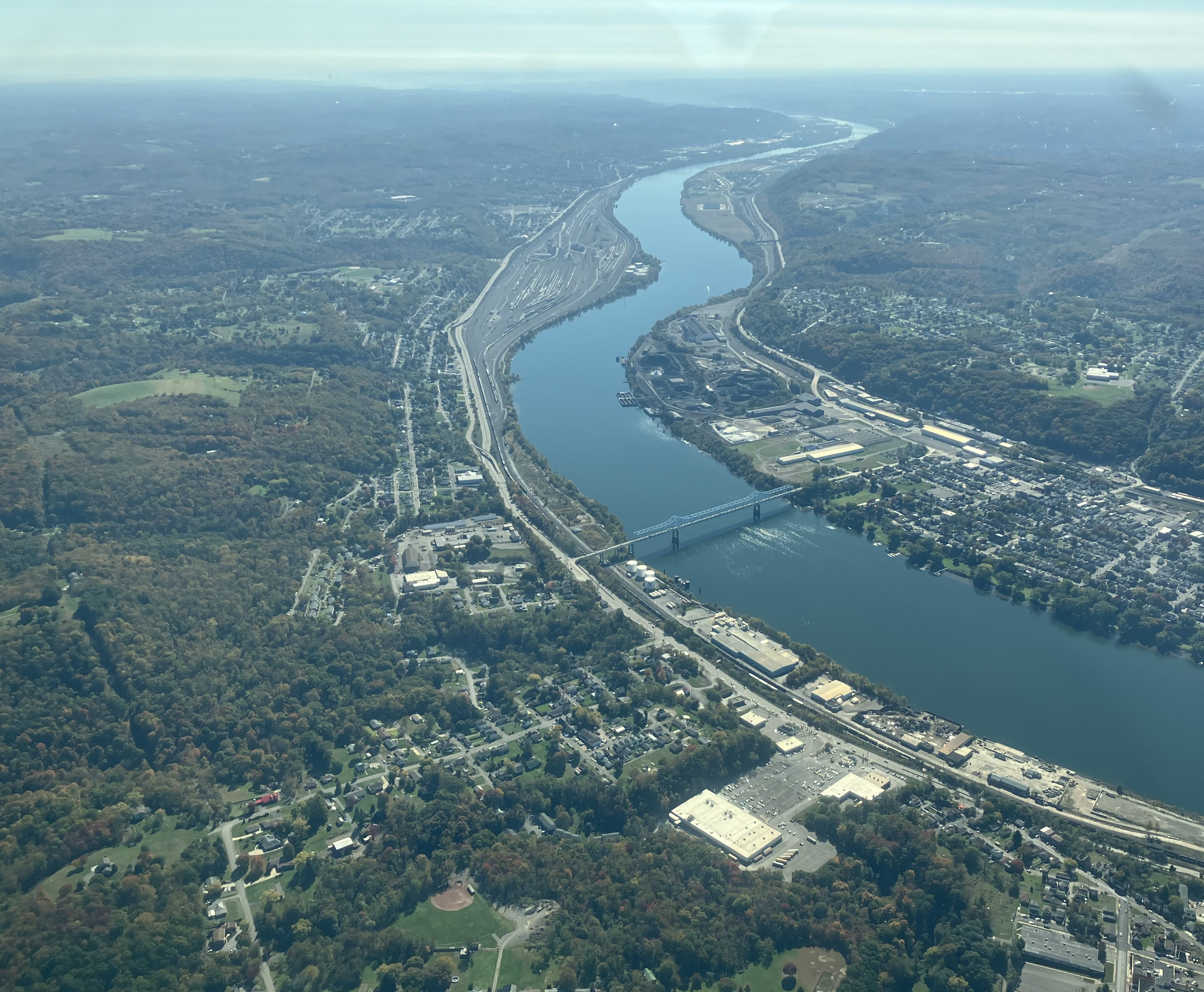
Conway Yard alongside Ohio River

Conway is the only remaining large operation of the four early-20th century PRR yards. NS processes 90,000 to 100,000 cars per month (as of 2003). The site occupies 568 acres, with 181 miles (291 km) of track and a storage capacity of over 11,000 cars and is a hump yard.

As of 2012, the yard employed 1,400 rail workers, with 60 to 80 trains traveling through it daily.

== See also ==
- List of rail yards
