= Gerald Grinstein =

American businessman

Gerald ("Jerry") Grinstein (born 1932) is an American businessman, the former chief executive officer (CEO) of Delta Air Lines. He was CEO of Burlington Northern Railroad from 1985 to 1995, and joined Delta's board of directors in 1987. He became CEO of Delta in 2004, a time of financial crisis for the airline. After overseeing the firm's survival through bankruptcy and implementing a restructuring program, he retired as CEO in 2007.

== Education ==
Grinstein received a BA from Yale University in 1954 and a JD from Harvard Law School in 1957.

== Business career ==
=== Burlington Northern Railroad ===
From 1985 to 1995 Grinstein was CEO of Burlington Northern Railroad (BN). In this position he helped form the corporate entity that resulted in BN's merger which formed the BNSF Railway. While at the helm of BN, Grinstein adopted a new paint scheme for the railroad's executive office car train. Named for its creator, "Grinstein Green" was applied to the train's F-units along with a cream colored stripe down the middle. This paint scheme was later applied to the railroad's last order for locomotives before the merger, the EMD SD70MAC. Even today, this paint scheme is simply referred to as either "Grinstein" or "Executive" paint and many of the SD70MACs on the roster still sport this scheme.

Grinstein received the Railroader of the Year award in 1996.

=== Delta Air Lines ===
When Western Airlines and Delta Air Lines, Inc. of Atlanta, Georgia merged in 1987, Grinstein, CEO of Western since 1985, was appointed to Delta's Board of Directors and has remained on the board since then. He took over as CEO in 2004, when Delta was in a deep financial crisis, after CEO Leo F. Mullin stepped down amid a controversy over executive retirement and cash bonus plans that were deemed excessive. Grinstein embarked on a number of cost-cutting measures, including a major out-of-court restructuring of the company's long term debt and outsourcing of some heavy aircraft maintenance and ramp handling operations. In negotiations with ALPA, the Delta pilots' union, he secured deep concessions in order to help the company stave off bankruptcy.

Grinstein also set about regaining the trust and confidence of Delta's employees. He granted himself an annual salary of $450,000 with no bonuses or stock options, well below the multimillion-dollar compensation packages accepted by Mullin and his top executives at a time when Delta was losing billions of dollars. Grinstein appointed new executives to Delta who assisted in the company's survival despite the airline's precarious financial position. He sought to maintain communication with the Delta Board Council and with representatives of frontline employees.

==== Bankruptcy and restructuring ====
Although these initiatives were largely successful, upward pressure on fuel prices and fierce competition from low-cost carriers continued to keep Delta perilously close to bankruptcy. Hurricane Katrina resulted in a dramatic spike in jet fuel prices in Atlanta, which houses Delta's largest hub operation. Delta, which had previously sold its fuel hedges in a move to raise cash, was forced into an untenable cash position. On September 14, 2005, Delta and its subsidiaries filed a petition for bankruptcy protection under Chapter 11 of the U.S. Bankruptcy Code. At the time of the bankruptcy filing, Delta's total debt was approximately $23.8 billion.

During Delta's bankruptcy, Grinstein and his management team accelerated the restructuring process that they had started in 2004. Delta shed non-performing assets, slashed the mainline fleet from nine models to five, and shed thousands of jobs. By 2007, Delta's mainline operation employed approximately 47,000, down from a high of 78,000 in 2001. Grinstein negotiated a second concessionary agreement from ALPA, imposed a second round of paycuts on nonunion employees, and froze the nonunion employee pension plan. He reduced his own pay by 25%, to approximately $325,000 per year.

Grinstein also oversaw a major restructuring of Delta's network footprint, closing the airline's Dallas–Fort Worth hub and cutting domestic flight schedules across the remaining hubs in an effort to redeploy aircraft and personnel to more profitable international markets. Delta entered more than 50 new international markets between 2005 and 2007 and since its merger with Northwest Airlines in 2008 has become the world's largest carrier.

In November 2006, US Airways launched an unsolicited hostile takeover bid for Delta, which Grinstein and his executive team led by Jim Whitehurst and Edward Bastian defeated by supporting the employee-led "Keep Delta My Delta" campaign.

==== Retirement ====
Grinstein retired in the summer of 2007, allocating his bankruptcy emergence stock grants to establish a scholarship fund for Delta employees and their children and a hardship fund for Delta families. He was succeeded by Richard Anderson, a former Northwest Airlines executive. Grinstein and his wife Carolyn live in Medina, Washington.

Preceded by Richard C. Grayson	CEO of Burlington Northern Railroad; 1985 – 1995	Succeeded by nobody
Preceded by Edward L. Moyers (SP)	Railroader of the Year; 1996 shared with Robert D. Krebs (ATSF)	Succeeded by Paul M. Tellier (CN)
Preceded by Leo F. Mullin, (Delta Air Lines Inc.)	Chief Executive Officer of Delta Air Lines; 2004–2007	Succeeded by Richard H. Anderson
