= Richard H. Anderson (businessman) =

American business executive

Richard Anderson
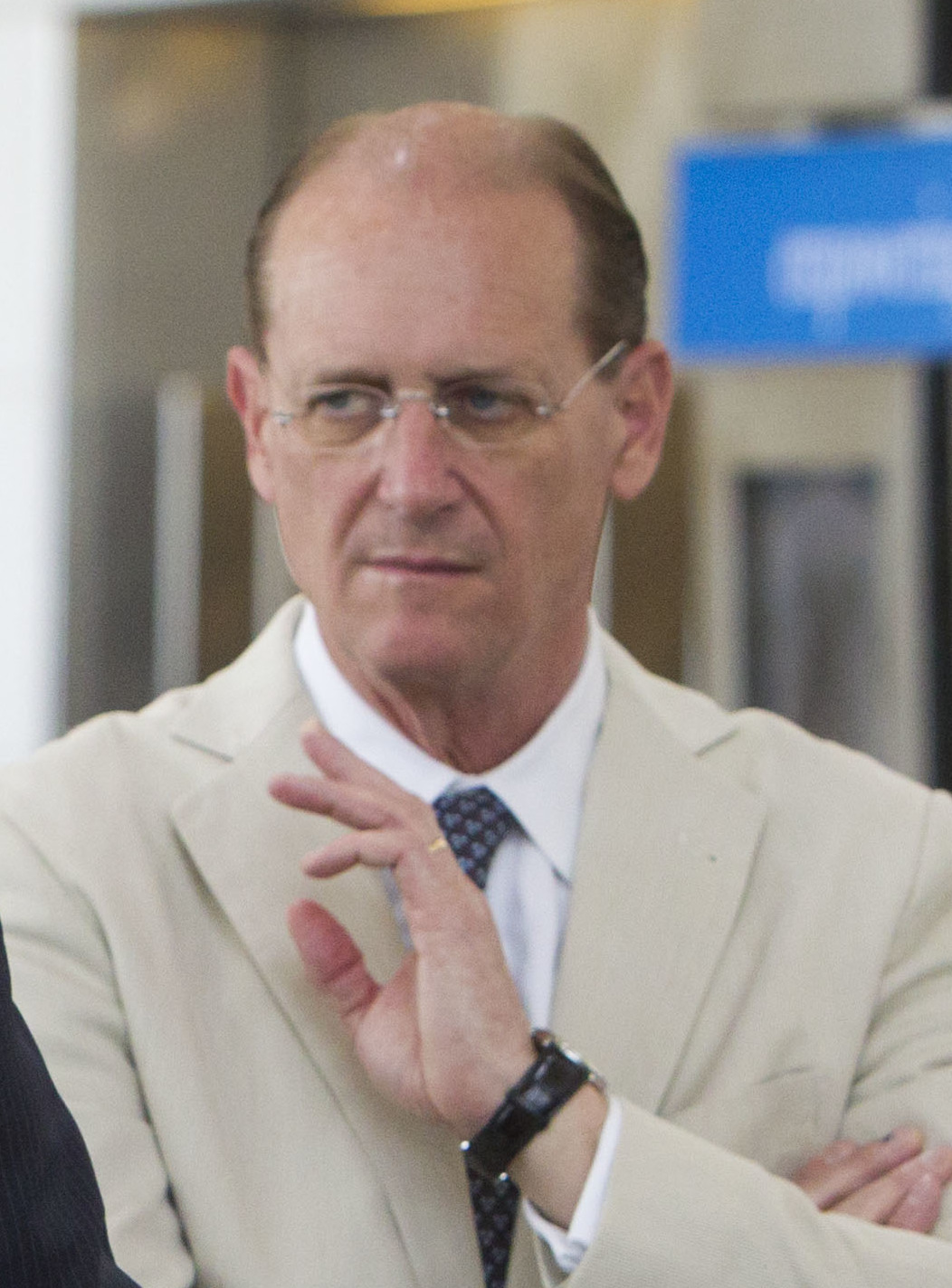
- Born: May 2, 1955 (age 71); Galveston, Texas, U.S.
- Education: Texas Tech University, Lubbock; University of Houston, Clear Lake (BA); South Texas College of Law (JD)
- Spouse: Sue Anderson
- Children: 2

CEO of Amtrak
- In office July 12, 2017 – April 15, 2020
- Preceded by: Charles Moorman
- Succeeded by: William J. Flynn

Richard H. Anderson (born May 2, 1955) is a American retired lawyer and business executive. In his early career, he was a prosecutor and corporate attorney, before moving into executive positions. His most prominent roles were as CEO of several large companies in the transportation industry: Northwest Airlines (2001–2004), Delta Air Lines (2007–2016), and Amtrak (2017–2020).

== Early life and education ==
Anderson was born in Galveston, Texas, to Hale Anderson, an office worker for the Atchison, Topeka and Santa Fe Railway, and Frances Anderson, a medical receptionist. His family, which also included five sisters, moved to Dallas and later Amarillo, Texas. His parents died of cancer when Richard was 20 years old.

Anderson attended Texas Tech University and the University of Houston, graduating from the latter in 1977 with a degree in political science. He earned a J.D. degree in 1982 from the South Texas College of Law before working as a prosecutor for the district attorney office of Harris County, Texas.

== Career ==
Anderson entered the aviation industry after accepting a legal position at Continental Airlines and was the airline's representative during the investigation of Continental Airlines Flight 1713 in 1987. Anderson, who had never considered a career in the aviation industry, accepted the position at the urging of Ben Hirst, a neighbor who worked at Continental as a legal counsel.

Hirst and Anderson left Continental for Northwest Airlines in 1990, with the latter a deputy general counsel for the airline. At Northwest, Anderson was initially charged with labor relations and government affairs. Despite having no experience in airline operations, he was named senior vice president of technical operations and airport affairs. Anderson was promoted to CEO of Northwest Airlines in June 2001 after the departure of John Dasburg.

Anderson was chief executive officer of Northwest Airlines from 2001 to 2004, Executive Vice President of UnitedHealth Group#UnitedHealthcare from 2004 to 2007, and as CEO of Delta Air Lines from 2007 to 2016, which would later merge with Northwest. In 2010, during his tenure at Delta, Anderson led an anti-union campaign against the Association of Flight Attendants, calling the labor union "un-Christian" and "immoral."

On February 3, 2016, Delta Air Lines announced Anderson would retire as CEO effective May 2, 2016, and assume position as Executive Chairman of the Delta Air Lines board of directors. On October 11, 2016, Anderson announced his retirement from the Board of Directors effective on the same day. He was succeeded by former chairman and CEO of The Home Depot, Francis Blake.

In June 2017, Amtrak announced Anderson as the organization's next President and CEO, replacing Charles "Wick" Moorman. Anderson assumed the title of President on July 12, 2017. Anderson also assumed the role of co-CEO on that date, alongside Moorman. Anderson remained co-CEO with Moorman until the end of 2017, at which time he assumed the role of sole CEO. On March 2, 2020, it was announced that Anderson would step down as CEO on April 15, 2020, after fulfilling his three-year commitment to the company. He remained with Amtrak through the end of the year as a senior advisor to his replacement, William J. Flynn.

In May 2024, Anderson joined the Norfolk Southern Railway board and became chairman in June 2025.

== Awards and honors ==
Anderson was named Aviation Week's Person of the Year for 2015. In 2013, he was the recipient of the Tony Jannus Award for distinguished achievement in commercial air transportation.

== See also ==
- List of railroad executives

Business positions
Preceded by John Dasburg	CEO of Northwest Airlines; 2001–2004	Succeeded by Douglas Steenland
Preceded by Gerald Grinstein	CEO of Delta Air Lines; 2007–2016	Succeeded by Ed Bastian
Preceded by Daniel Carp	Chairman of Delta Air Lines; 2016	Succeeded by Frank Blake
Preceded by Charles Moorman	President & CEO of Amtrak; 2017–2020	Succeeded by William J. Flynn
