= Alan H. Shaw =

American businessman

Alan Shaw
- Born: Alan Howard Shaw; United States
- Other names: Alan H. Shaw
- Education: Virginia Tech (BS and MBA); Harvard Business School
- Occupation: Business executive
- Title: President and CEO of Norfolk Southern
- Predecessor: James A. Squires
- Successor: Mark R. George

Alan Howard Shaw is an American business executive who was the president and chief executive officer of Norfolk Southern, a Class I railroad operating freight trains in the United States. He held the CEO position from May 1, 2022 until September 2024.

== Early life ==
Shaw attended Virginia Tech and received a Bachelor of Science in Aerospace Engineering in 1989 and a Master of Business Administration there in 1992. At Harvard Business School, he completed the General Management Program in 2012. He is a chartered financial analyst.

== Career ==
Shaw worked at Norfolk Southern in various positions from 1994 until 2024. Prior to becoming president of Norfolk Southern in 2021 and CEO in 2022, Shaw was executive vice president and chief marketing officer at the company for six years. He had previously been vice president of intermodal operations at the company. His first vice president position at Norfolk Southern was vice president of chemicals, beginning in 2009. He also sits on the board of Virginia Wesleyan University. He sits on the boards of other educational institutions as well.

When Shaw became CEO in 2022, he had 27 years of experience at Norfolk Southern in marketing, operations, and finance.

=== Termination ===
In September 2024, the Norfolk Southern board of directors hired an independent law firm to investigate claims that Shaw had contravened the railroad’s ethics policies in an undisclosed inappropriate (but consensual) relationship with Norfolk Southern's chief legal officer, Nabanita Chaterjee Nag. Shortly after the initial reports, the Wall Street Journal, Reuters and other media reported that Shaw would resign his position as CEO due to the investigation. On September 11, 2024, Norfolk Southern's board issued a statement that a unanimous decision was reached to terminate Shaw and Nag's employment immediately. The company's CFO, Mark George, was named president and CEO, replacing Shaw.

=== Operations and safety ===
In December 2022, Shaw announced a new strategy for Norfolk Southern at the company's Investor Day, the first since he became CEO, that placed less of a focus on operating ratio and precision scheduled railroading. Precision scheduled railroading is a method that the Class I railroads deployed to streamline operations, particularly during the COVID-19 pandemic. Shaw's strategy, instead, focuses on building the resources required to provide reliable service throughout the year, instead of frequently furloughing employees. The plan also includes investing in locomotives, track improvements, rail yards, technology, and employee training during economic downturns.

Under Alan Shaw's management, Norfolk Southern implemented several safety protocols as part of a six-point safety plan in which Norfolk Southern will add about 200 more hot bearing detectors to its rail network.

In May 2023, Shaw and 12 union leaders, issued a safety letter to employees and union members committing to enhanced rail safety for employees and communities served by Norfolk Southern.

Under Shaw, Norfolk Southern reported 37% fewer accidents on its main lines in the first 10 months of 2023 than in the same period of 2022. Norfolk Southern was the only one of the top five freight railroads with a decrease in accidents during this time period.

=== East Palestine derailment ===
He has drawn attention in the wake of the February 3, 2023 East Palestine railroad derailment of a 150-car train and chemical leakage in East Palestine, Ohio. He visited the community in the week following the accident. He followed this with a public letter to the community, which began, "We will not walk away, East Palestine." On a second visit he met with the city's Mayor Trent Conaway, Congressman Bill Johnson, Fire Chief Keith Drabick, and first responders. On February 22, 2023, he appeared at a town hall on CNN hosted by Jake Tapper. In the town hall, he apologized to East Palestine residents, saying, "I'm terribly sorry for what has happened to your community." He added, "I want you to know that Norfolk Southern is here, and we're going to stay here. And we're going to make this right."

In July 2024, Shaw attended the groundbreaking of a $25 million park renovation project in East Palestine.

=== Compensation ===
Shaw's compensation in 2023 increased by 37% in his first full year as CEO. His total pay grew from $9.8 million (US) in 2022 to $13.4 million (US) in 2023, with base improving to $1.1 million and stock options rising from $2.2 million to $10 million.

While Norfolk Southern has donated to Ohio elected officials through its corporate PAC, Shaw has eschewed donating directly to politicians. Instead, he donates to the company’s good government fund.

=== Recognition ===
Shaw has pointed to resiliency as a key aspect of the company’s strategy. He has been praised for implementing customer-centric service and changing the culture. In 2023, Shaw was awarded the Railroad Innovator Award by industry publications Progressive Railroading and Rail Trends. He has pointed to his upbringing as to how he developed the values of integrity and doing the right thing.

== Philanthropy ==
In May 2023, Shaw established the Bulldog Legacy Scholarship at East Palestine High School. He contributed an endowment of $445,000 to provide scholarships for students indefinitely by generating income to support the scholarships year after year.

== Personal life ==
Shaw is married with four children.

== Controversies ==
In February 2024, an activist investor proposed to remove Shaw as CEO. In May 2024, shareholders voted against the proposal, with roughly half of Norfolk Southern's unionized workers supporting keeping Shaw in his position.

Two Teamsters unions representing employees announced they wanted Shaw replaced, while the AFL-CIO announced its support. One of NS's largest customers, Cleveland-Cliffs, also publicly announced its support of removing Shaw.

The Teamsters’ decision to support firing Shaw was influenced by Shaw’s hiring of John Orr as COO. Shaw and NS had to pay $25 million to Orr's former employer to hire him. Some investors criticized the hire for what they consider to be an excessive buyout package coupled with a record of racial and sexual discrimination allegations. NS, however, defended Shaw and Orr, pointing to Orr’s record of improving performance and safety.

Shaw survived the effort to oust him, with shareholders voting to keep Shaw in his position.

In September 2024, it was reported that Shaw would resign from his role at NS following allegations of workplace misconduct

Business positions
| Preceded by James A. Squires | President of Norfolk Southern Railway; 2021 – | Incumbent |
| Preceded by James A. Squires | CEO of Norfolk Southern Corporation; 2022 – | Incumbent |
