= List of Norfolk Southern Railway predecessor railroads =

The following railroads merged to form the Norfolk Southern Railway.

- The Southern Railway changed its name to the Norfolk Southern Railway on December 31, 1990.
  - The Norfolk and Western Railway was leased by the Southern Railway on December 31, 1990, and merged into the Southern in 1997.
    - The New York, Chicago and St. Louis Railroad (Nickel Plate Road) merged into the Norfolk and Western Railway on October 16, 1964.
      - The Wheeling and Lake Erie Railway was leased by the New York, Chicago and St. Louis Railroad on December 1, 1949, and merged into the Norfolk and Western Railway on September 16, 1988.
    - The Akron, Canton and Youngstown Railway was leased by the Norfolk and Western Railway on October 16, 1964, and merged January 1, 1982. Its remaining lines were spun off to the new Wheeling and Lake Erie Railway on May 17, 1990.
    - The Pittsburgh and West Virginia Railway was leased by the Norfolk and Western Railway on October 16, 1964, but was leased to the new Wheeling and Lake Erie Railway on May 17, 1990.
    - The Wabash Railway was leased by the Norfolk and Western Railway October 16, 1964 before becoming a wholly owned subsidiary of the Norfolk & Western in December 1991. In 1997, the Wabash was merged into NS along with its parent, the N&W.
    - The Virginian Railway merged into the Norfolk and Western Railway on December 1, 1959.

Other companies:

- Alabama Great Southern Railroad
- Atlanta and Charlotte Air-Line Railway
- Atlantic, Mississippi and Ohio Railroad
- Central of Georgia Railroad
  - The Georgia and Florida Railroad merged into the Central of Georgia Railway June 1, 1971.
  - The Savannah and Atlanta Railway merged into the Central of Georgia Railway in 1971.
- City Point Railroad
- East Tennessee, Virginia and Georgia Railway
- Georgia Pacific Railway
- Illinois Terminal Railroad
- Lawrenceville Branch Railroad
- Memphis and Charleston Railroad
- Norfolk and Petersburg Railroad
- Norfolk Southern Railway (1942–1982)
- North Carolina Railroad
- North Eastern Railroad (Georgia)
- Orange and Alexandria Railroad
- Piedmont Railway
- Piedmont Air-Line Railway
- Rabun Gap Short Line Railway
- Richmond and Danville Railroad
- Richmond and West Point Terminal Railway and Warehouse Company
- Richmond and York River Railroad
- Shenandoah Valley Railroad
- South Side Railroad
- Virginia and Tennessee Railroad

A family tree, so to speak, of Conrail, CSX Transportation, and Norfolk Southern Railway. Links are clickable.
