= James A. Squires =

American railroad executive

James A. Squires is an American railroad executive who was the president, chief executive officer, and executive chairman of Norfolk Southern Railway until his retirement on May 1, 2022; Squires had left the presidency on December 1, 2021.

Squires was born in Hollis, New Hampshire, and has degrees from Amherst College and the University of Chicago Law School. He joined Norfolk Southern in 1992, and after working his way up the executive chain at the company was promoted to president in 2013. He was appointed to the CEO position, replacing Charles Moorman, in June 2015, and later in the year took over Moorman's role as Executive Chairman of NS' board as well.

Business positions
Preceded by Charles Moorman	President of Norfolk Southern Railway; 2013 - 2021	Next: Alan H. Shaw
Preceded by Charles Moorman	CEO of Norfolk Southern Corporation; 2015 - 2022	Next: Alan H. Shaw
