= Harrisburg Intermodal Yard =

Rail yard in Harrisburg, Pennsylvania, US

Coordinates: 40.295°N 76.891°W

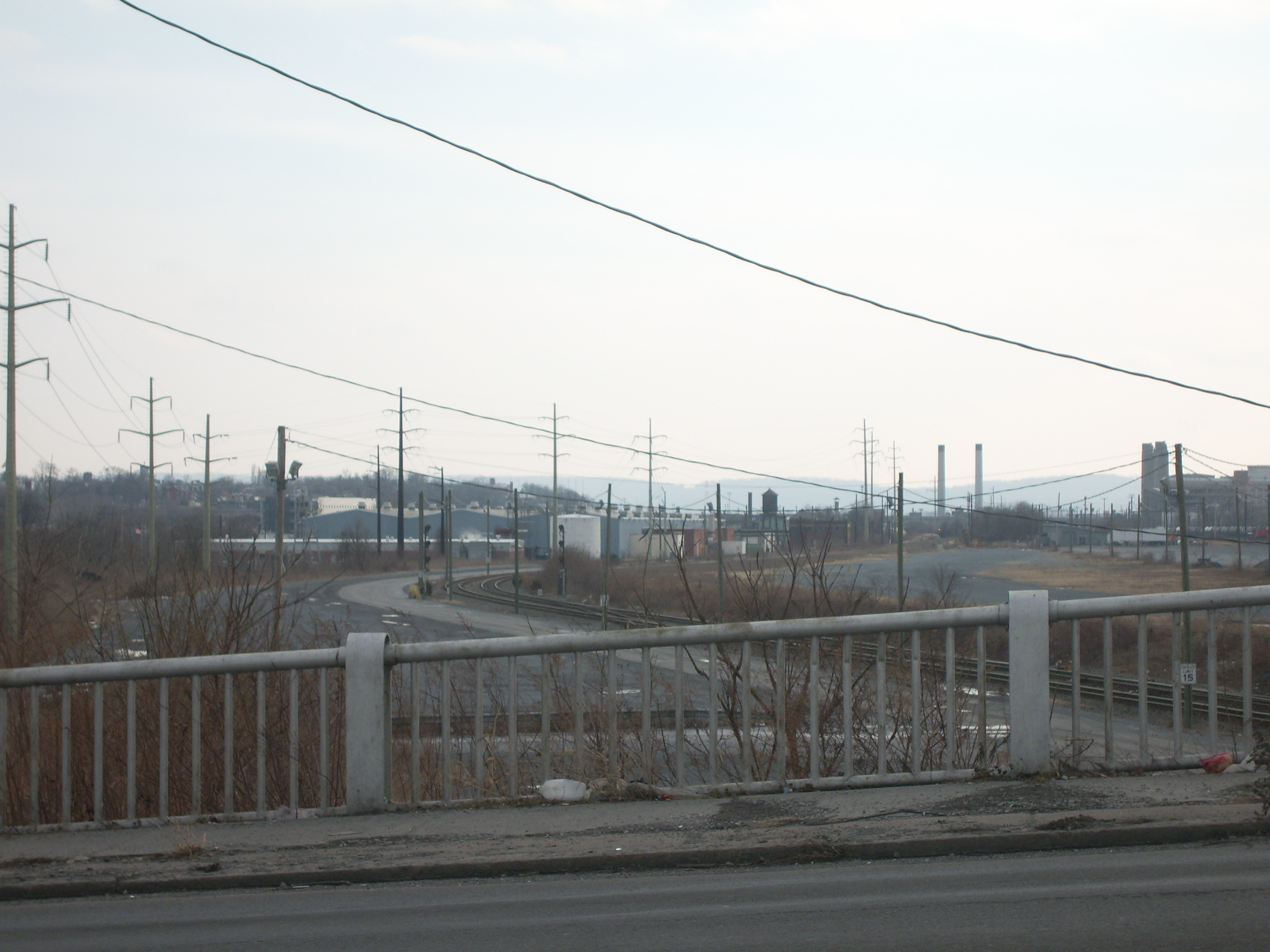
View of the Harrisburg Intermodal Yard from Maclay Street Bridge in Harrisburg, Pennsylvania.

Harrisburg Intermodal Yard is a large rail yard located in Harrisburg, Pennsylvania. The yard originally was operated by the Pennsylvania Railroad and was known as the Lucknow Yard, later to be operated by Conrail, and since 1999, has been operated by the Norfolk Southern Railway. The Harrisburg Yard, the Enola Yard and the Rutherford Yard are the three major rail facilities located in the Harrisburg area.

== See also ==
- Buffalo Line
- Harrisburg Line
