= Charles Moorman =

American businessman and railroader

Charles W. Moorman IV

Chairman of the Board Railroaders Memorial Museum
- Incumbent
- Assumed office November 2020

President of East Broad Top Foundation
- Incumbent
- Assumed office February 8, 2020

Co-CEO of Amtrak
- In office July 12, 2017 – December 31, 2017

President and CEO of Amtrak
- In office September 1, 2016 – July 12, 2017
- Preceded by: Joseph H. Boardman
- Succeeded by: Richard Anderson

Personal details
- Born: 1952 (age 73–74) Hattiesburg, Mississippi, U.S.

Charles Wickliffe "Wick" Moorman IV (born 1952) is an American businessman and railroader. Moorman is currently a consultant with Amtrak, where he formerly served as president and CEO as well as co-CEO. Prior to his hiring by Amtrak, Moorman served as chairman, president and CEO of Norfolk Southern Railway. At Norfolk Southern, he succeeded David R. Goode on February 1, 2006. Moorman served as president from 2004 to 2013 and chief executive officer from 2005 until his initial retirement in 2015.

Moorman has served in a number of leadership positions at Norfolk Southern and its predecessor railroads including senior vice president corporate planning and services, president of Thoroughbred Technology and Telecommunications, vice president information technology, and vice president personnel and labor relations.

== Career ==
Moorman is a 1975 graduate of Georgia Tech and Harvard Business School, he joined Norfolk Southern predecessor, Southern Railway, in 1970 as a Co-Op while still attending Georgia Tech. He was also a member of Tau Kappa Epsilon fraternity.

On December 9, 2010, Railway Age named Moorman the Railroader of the Year recipient for 2011.

In 2011, Moorman was involved in the launch of the 21st Century Steam, a revival of Norfolk Southern's popular steam excursion program which had been ended in 1994. On June 1, 2013, Moorman was succeeded as president of Norfolk Southern by James A. Squires.

On August 19, 2016, Amtrak announced that Moorman had been selected to become the railroad's new president and CEO to succeed Joseph H. Boardman on September 1. Moorman, who had stated that he only intended to serve as a "transitional CEO", served as CEO for less than one year before former Delta Air Lines executive Richard Anderson was named president and co-CEO in June 2017. Moorman remained with Amtrak as co-CEO with Anderson until the end of 2017 before transitioning into an advisory role in 2018.

On February 8, 2020, it was announced that the East Broad Top Foundation had acquired most of the railroad assets of the East Broad Top Railroad and Coal Company. It was announced that Moorman was the president of the foundation.

== Compensation ==
While CEO of Norfolk Southern in 2008, Moorman earned a total compensation of just over $9 million, which included a base salary of $950,000, a cash bonus of $1,759,400, stocks granted of $6,768,618, and options granted of $2,415,000. Moorman's contract with Amtrak calls for him to be paid $1 per year with incentive pay up to $500,000 per year based on criteria set by the Amtrak board of directors.

== Honors ==
Moorman was elected a member of the National Academy of Engineering in 2016 for leadership in the development of computerized freight railroad tracking system in North America.

== See also ==
- List of railroad executives

Business positions
Preceded by David R. Goode	President of Norfolk Southern Railway; 2004–2013	Succeeded by James A. Squires
Preceded by David R. Goode	CEO of Norfolk Southern Corporation; 2005–2015	Succeeded by James A. Squires
Preceded by Joseph H. Boardman	CEO of Amtrak; 2016 – 2017 (Co-CEO with Richard Anderson: July–December 2017)	Succeeded by Richard Anderson
Preceded by Joseph H. Boardman	President of Amtrak; 2016–2017	Succeeded by Richard Anderson
Awards and achievements
Preceded by Matthew K. Rose (BNSF)	Railroader of the Year; 2011	Succeeded by David L. Starling
