= Enola Yard =

Rail yard in East Pennsboro Township, Pennsylvania

Coordinates: 40.294666°N 76.925336°W

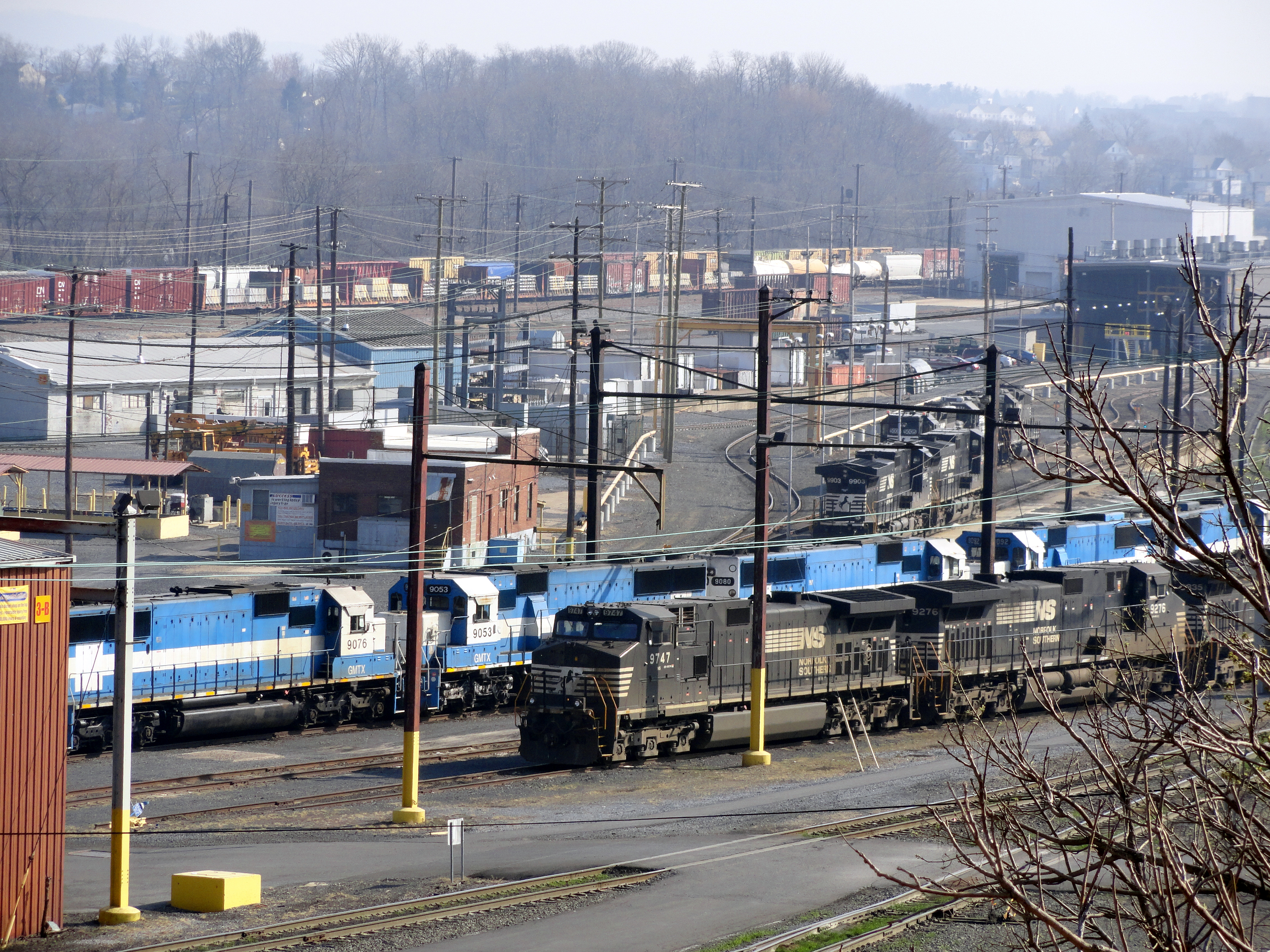
Central terminal and service area at Enola Yard in 2012. A trio of GE D9-40CWs and a line of Oakway EMD SD60s can be seen near the bottom of the image.

Enola Yard is a large rail yard located in East Pennsboro Township, Pennsylvania, along the western shore of the Susquehanna River in Harrisburg, Pennsylvania.

Built in 1905 and expanded through the 1930s, Enola yard was the world's largest freight yard in 1956. It remains in operation today, though it has long since been eclipsed in size and traffic, first by Conway Yard outside Pittsburgh, PA and later by Bailey Yard in North Platte, Nebraska.

== History ==
The Pennsylvania Railroad (PRR) built the yard in 1905 with two hump classification yards. Initially, the yard processed 7,000 cars per day. The westbound complex had a 20-track receiving yard and 25 classification tracks; the eastbound, a 21-track receiving yard and 17 classification tracks. There were no separate departure yards.

By the late 1920s, Enola encompassed 316 acres and had a capacity of 9,692 cars. Service buildings included a 43-stall roundhouse and a steel car shop. A 240-car yard to handle container freight was added to the complex in 1932. Starting with the eastbound hump in 1938, the PRR rebuilt the component yards and installed automatic retarders. The eastbound yard was electrified with 11,000-volt alternating current (AC) service. (See Amtrak's 25 Hz traction power system.)

The average daily traffic load in 1939 was 11,207 cars, rising as World War II approached 14,100 daily cars in October 1941. The yard's one-day record was 20,660 cars in June 1943. In 1944, the westbound complex was rebuilt with 16 receiving tracks (enough to hold 1,721 cars) and 35 classification tracks, followed by the eastbound complex with 15 receiving tracks (enough to hold 1,948 cars) and 33 classification tracks. Each had a hump yard that could hold 2,668 cars.

The engine house at mid-century had 46 stalls and two turntables. A diesel locomotive shop was added in the late 1940s.

In 1953, the yard comprised 145 miles of track and 476 switches and handled 11,000 cars per day. In the 1950s, PRR rebuilt Conway Yard near Pittsburgh, which upon its reopening in 1959 became the railroad's major yard for east–west traffic. Traffic at Enola Yard declined.

In 1976, Conrail took over the operation of Enola Yard, whose traffic declined as Conrail began to route more trains over nearby tracks of the former Reading and Lehigh Valley rail lines. In 1983, Conrail removed electrification equipment and closed the eastbound hump yard; it closed the westbound hump yard in 1993. The steel car shop closed in 1996.

== Current operation ==
The yard is currently owned by the Norfolk Southern Railway (NS), which has operated a flat classification yard and increased operations since taking over from Conrail in 1999. In 2003, NS announced plans to resume hump yard operations. As of 2005, the yard was operating 79 tracks and handled 275,000 tons of freight a day.

== See also ==
- Enola Branch (Norfolk Southern Railway)
- List of rail yards
