= Leo Mullin =

American executive and civic activist (born 1943)

Leo F. Mullin
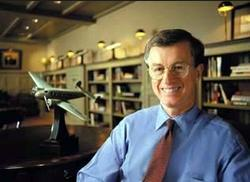
- Mullin on the eve of his retirement from Delta
- Born: January 26, 1943 (age 83); Concord, Massachusetts, U.S.
- Education: Harvard College (A.B.); Harvard University (M.S.); Harvard Business School (M.B.A.)
- Occupations: President; CEO; Chairman of the Board; Philanthropist
- Known for: Former CEO of Delta Air Lines
- Predecessor: Ronald W. Allen
- Spouse: Leah Malmberg (m. 1965)
- Children: 2

Leo F. Mullin (born 1943) is an American executive and civic activist who was CEO and Chairman of Delta Air Lines (1997-2004). He led Delta during one of the most tumultuous periods in aviation history, beginning in 1997, just as airlines were struggling to emerge from the economic crises of the early 1990s. Three years into his tenure as CEO, he also was named board chairman of the International Air Transport Association (IATA), representing the world’s airlines. Mullin achieved particular prominence following the September 11, 2001 tragedy when, with the airline industry on the brink of failure, he was the chief legislative and public spokesperson for the industry’s recovery program. He retired as CEO of Delta in 2003, and as chairman in 2004. After Delta, Mullin has emerged as a leader in both the public and private sectors, working for other companies and continuing to be a philanthropic contributor.

== Early life ==
Born in Concord, Massachusetts, Mullin was raised as one of eight children in the neighboring mill town of Maynard, where his parents, Leo Mullin, Sr. and Alice L. (Fearns) taught at Maynard High School and from which Mullin graduated in 1960. Mullin's father also served as a principal and selectman from Maynard. As a recipient of a Harvard National Scholarship, Mullin graduated from Harvard College in 1964 cum laude with a bachelor's degree in engineering and applied physics, an MS in applied mathematics from Harvard’s Graduate School of Arts and Sciences in 1965 and an MBA in 1967 from Harvard Business School.

== Career ==
Mullin began his career in 1967 with nine years as a management consultant with McKinsey & Company in its Washington, D.C. office, with the last three years as a partner. Notably, while at McKinsey, he played a crucial role in the creation of the Consolidated Rail Corporation (Conrail), the government’s response to one of the most massive infrastructure crises in U.S. history. He joined Conrail in 1976 to oversee both the merging of the nine bankrupt railroads that ultimately constituted Conrail and implementation of its successful rescue plan.

In 1981, Mullin joined First Chicago, the nation’s tenth largest bank. His fourteen-year career included leadership roles in consumer, corporate and international banking and three years as CEO of American National Bank, a troubled First Chicago subsidiary. Following the American National turnaround, he was named President of First Chicago and its principal subsidiary, the First National Bank of Chicago. Upon the pending merger of First Chicago with the National Bank of Detroit, he joined Commonwealth Edison, the nation’s largest purveyor of nuclear power in the electric utility industry, as vice-chairman.

In the summer of 1997, he was recruited to Delta Air Lines to become its CEO at a critical time for the airline—facing take-over threats, an outdated technological infrastructure with the Y2K calendar change looming, a weak international alliance, and no functional diversity program. With a CEO now in place, immediate take-over challenges diminished, and its technology turned around, Delta not only got through Y2K without a glitch, but saw a technological transformation of employees at all levels. Every employee was given a personal computer to take home by the end of the year. Mullin reported, “For many it represented their chance—and the impetus—to get over the digital divide.” In 2000, SkyTeam, an initiative instigated by Delta and AirFrance which included Aeromexico and Korean Air, brought Delta up to equal status with its competitors. Additionally, by January 2001, a newly appointed Vice President of Global Diversity was in full and empowered gear. Reflecting Delta’s increasing commitment to minority inclusion and human rights while speaking at former Atlanta Mayor Maynard Jackson’s funeral in June 2003, he noted, “When you expand economic opportunity to more people, the circle of prosperity expands with it.”

Upon Mullin’s retirement from Delta as CEO at the end of 2003, he embarked on a career as a business advisor and corporate board member. Board appointments included Johnson & Johnson, Chubb and Bell South. He also held an eleven-year appointment as senior advisor to Goldman Sachs Alternatives. During that time, he was on the boards of nine Goldman-sponsored companies, culminating in his appointment as board chairman in 2015 at TransUnion, the Chicago-based data analytics company. He retired from that position in May 2020.

== Personal life, philanthropy, and civic involvement ==
Throughout his business career, Mullin remained significantly involved in civic and charitable arenas. He was chairman of the Juvenile Diabetes Research Foundation (the nation’s largest non-governmental funder of diabetes research), Chairman of the Field Museum of Natural History in Chicago, vice-chairman of the Chicago Urban League and as a board member of Northwestern University, Chicago’s Children’s Hospital, the President’s Export Council (appointed by President Clinton) and was a member of the Business Council and the Business Roundtable.

He and his wife, Leah (née Malmberg), whom he married after her service as a Peace Corps volunteer in Peru (1963-1965), and who is a graduate of Bryn Mawr College, are parents of two children.
