= Walton Furnace, Virginia =

Unincorporated community in the U.S. state of Virginia

- Unincorporated community
- Location within Virginia Location within the United States
- Coordinates: 36°53′1″N 80°56′4″W
- Country: United States
- State: Virginia
- County: Wythe
- Elevation: 2,083 ft (635 m)
- Time zone: UTC−5 (Eastern (EST))
  - Summer (DST): UTC−4 (EDT)
- GNIS feature ID: 1496372

Walton Furnace is an unincorporated community in Wythe County, Virginia, United States.
