= Douglas Steenland =

Former American attorney and airline executive

Douglas M. Steenland (born September 17, 1951) is an American former corporate attorney and former airline executive. He had a 17-year career at Northwest Airlines, where he held numerous executive roles, including as president from 2001 through 2008, and president and CEO of Northwest from October 2004 until its merger with Delta Air Lines in October 2008. Since then he has served on a number of boards of directors, and as an advisor to the Blackstone Group.

== Education ==
Steenland received a B.A. in history from Calvin College and a J.D. from the National Law Center at George Washington University.

== Career ==
=== Early career ===
Following law school, Steenland worked for two years at the Office of the General Counsel of the U.S. Department of Transportation. He then joined the Washington, D.C. law firm Verner, Liipfert, Bernhard, McPherson and Hand (now part of DLA Piper), where his focus included work for airlines regarding regulations, acquisitions, and new overseas markets. He rose to become a senior partner at the firm.

=== Northwest Airlines ===
After his team at the law firm represented Northwest Airlines during a leveraged buyout and other matters from 1989 to 1991, Steenland was hired by the airline as vice president/deputy general counsel in 1991. He was promoted to senior vice president/general counsel in 1994, and to executive vice president/general counsel and alliances in 1998. He was subsequently promoted to executive vice president/chief corporate officer in 1999 and to president and board member in 2001.

From 2004 to 2008 he was president and Chief executive officer of Northwest Airlines. He led the airline through a period marked by severe economic difficulties for U.S. airlines, caused by factors such as the aftereffects of 9/11 and the SARS epidemic, the 2008 financial crisis, rising fuel prices, and the Iraq War.

In 2008, Steenland led Northwest into a merger with Delta Air Lines. The merger was completed in October 2008; at that time Steenland retired from Northwest and joined the board of directors of the merged company, Delta, and remained on its board till 2011.

=== Additional positions ===
Steenland was chairman of the Air Transport Association from January 2008 to December 2009.

He was appointed to the board of directors of International Lease Finance Corporation in September 2009, and was made non-executive chairman in December 2009, serving in that role until June 2012. In 2010, he was appointed the non-executive chairman of Performance Food Group, a position he held until February 2019. In August 2011, he was appointed vice chairman of Travelport's board of directors, and in May 2013 he was promoted to chairman, a position he held until the company's acquisition by private equity investors in 2019.

He was appointed to the board of directors of AIG in June 2009. and has been non-executive chairman of the company since July 2015. He has been on the board of directors of Hilton Worldwide since September 2009. He has been a senior advisor at the Blackstone Group since 2009.

He is a lifetime director on the board of the Guthrie Theater in Minneapolis, Minnesota.

== Personal life ==
Steenland is married and has two children.
