= Saverne Tunnel =

Rail tunnel in France

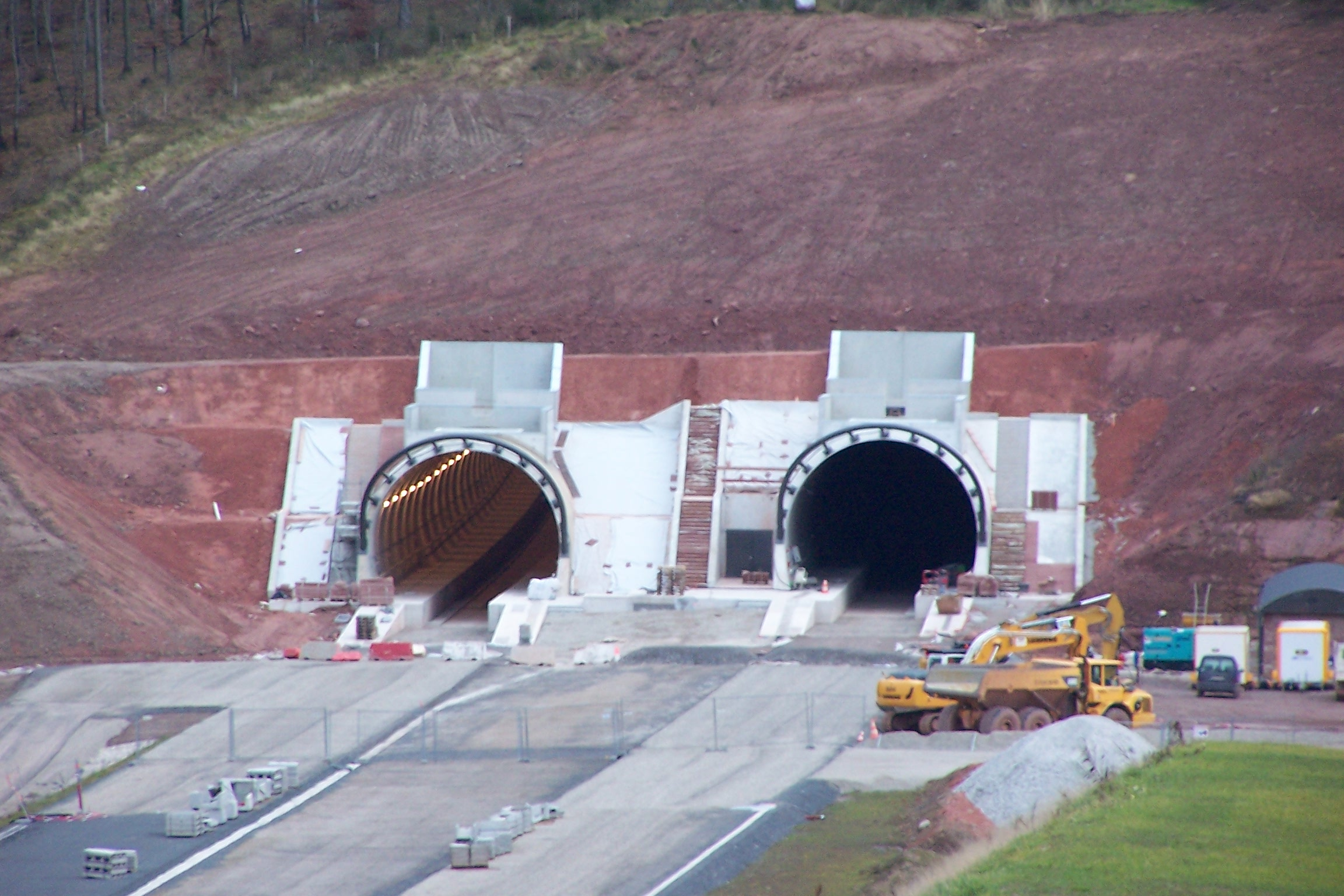
- Western portal in 2013, during construction.

Overview
- Official name: Tunnel de Saverne
- Line: LGV Est
- Location: Arrondissement of Saverne, Bas-Rhin, Grand Est, France
- Coordinates: 48.78028°N 7.36639°E
- Status: Completed
- System: TGV
- Start: Eckartswiller
- End: Ernolsheim-lès-Saverne

Operation
- Work began: October 2010
- Constructed: February 2011 – December 2013
- Opened: 3 July 2016
- Owner: SNCF
- Operator: SNCF
- Traffic: Train
- Character: Passenger (High-speed rail)

Technical
- Design engineer: BG Consulting Engineers
- Length: 4,000 metres (2.49 mi)
- Line length: 8,000 m (4.97 mi) (total of both lines, one per tunnel)
- No. of tracks: single (one per tunnel)
- Track gauge: 1,435 mm (4 ft 8 1/2 in) standard gauge
- Electrified: 25 kV 50 Hz OHLE
- Operating speed: 320 kilometres per hour (200 mph)
- Width: 8.90 m (29.2 ft)
- Grade: 1.9% (average; 70 m difference between west and east portals)

Route map

The Saverne Tunnel (French: Tunnel de Saverne), also known as the Ernolsheim-lès-Saverne Tunnel (French: Tunnel d'Ernolsheim-lès-Saverne), is a twin-bore 4-kilometre-long (2.5 mi), high-speed rail tunnel in western Bas-Rhin, France. It carries the LGV Est line of France's TGV high-speed rail network through the narrowest part of the Vosges mountain range, beneath Mont Saint-Michel and adjacent to the Saverne Pass. The tunnel consists of two bores, containing one rail track each, that are connected by passageways every 500 metres (1,600 ft). The LGV Est crosses the 270 m (890 ft) Haspelbaechel viaduct near the western end of the tunnel. The tunnel was excavated by a tunnel boring machine between November 2011 and February 2013. Civil engineering work on the tunnel ended in April 2014 and it opened with the rest of the second phase of the LGV Est on 3 July 2016. The total cost of the tunnel was approximately €200 million.

== Background ==
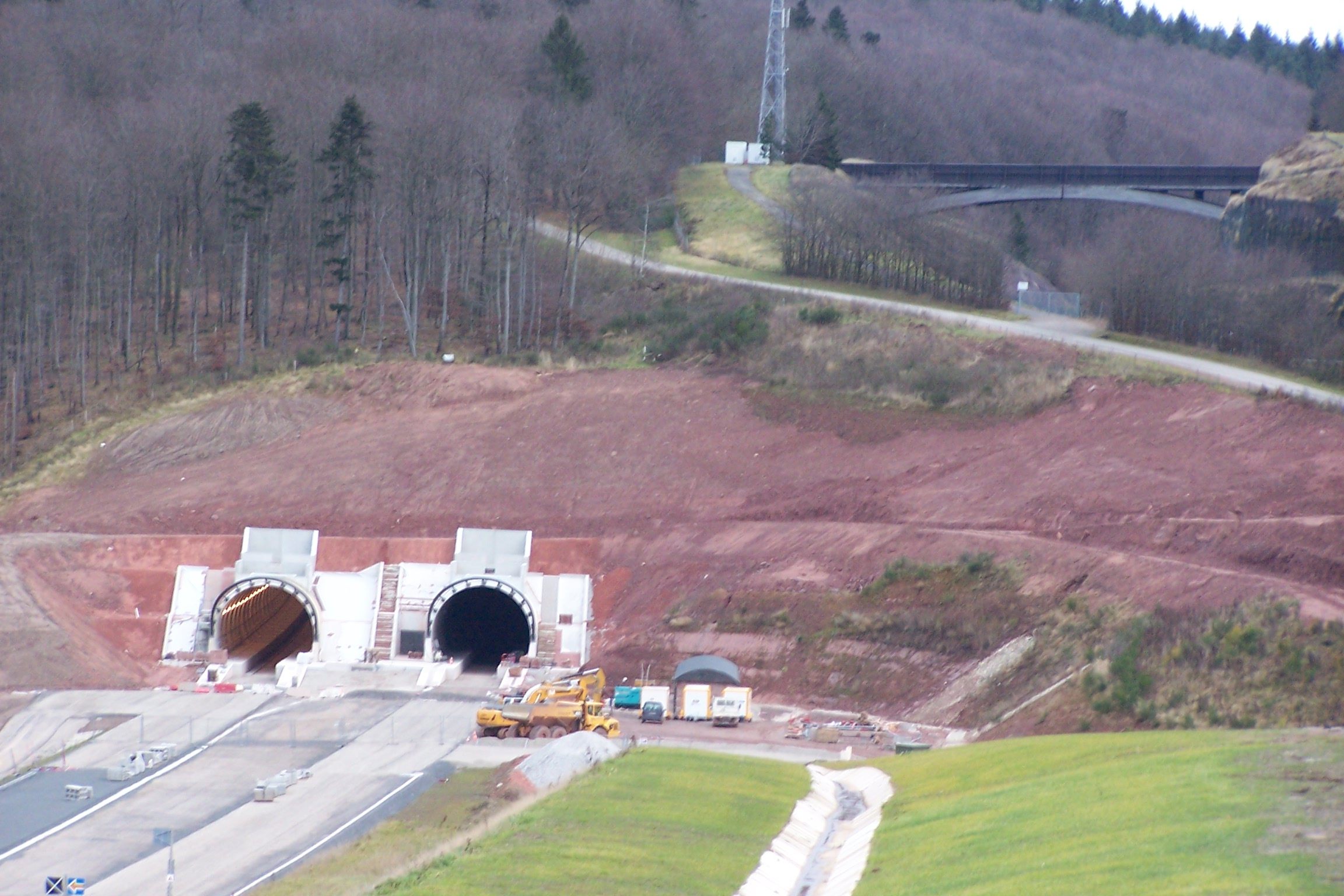
Western portal during construction. The bridge in the upper-right crosses the Saverne Pass and A4 Autoroute.

The Saverne Tunnel was constructed as part of the second phase of the LGV Est européenne (often shortened to LGV Est). to connect Paris and Strasbourg—the principal city of the Grand Est region and home to several European institutions, including the Council of Europe. The first phase across 300 kilometres (190 mi) of relatively flat land from Vaires-sur-Marne (near Paris) to Baudrecourt (near Metz and Nancy) opened in 2007. The second phase traverses 106 km (66 mi) of rougher terrain from Baudrecourt to Vendenheim (near Strasbourg). Opened in 2016, it further reduced travel time between Paris and Strasbourg from 2h20min to 1h50min and reduced travel time from Luxembourg City to Strasbourg from 2h10min to 1h25min. The Saverne Tunnel crosses the northern Vosges at its narrowest point and is adjacent to the Saverne Pass, which already contains the A4 autoroute, Departmental Route 219, and remnants of an ancient Roman road.

The line was originally built for Réseau Ferré de France (RFF), which owned and operated the infrastructure of the French national railway network. In a government restructuring of the French railroad network, RFF was merged into SNCF on 1 January 2015 and is now a subdivision of SNCF known as SNCF Réseau.

== Construction ==
The tunnel was part of the Lot 47 segment of the LGV Est for the contracting and construction. Lot 47 consisted of the Saverne Tunnel, the adjacent Haspelbaechel viaduct, and an additional 3.3 kilometres (2.1 mi) of the LGV line through the communes of Danne-et-Quatre-Vents in Moselle and Eckartswiller, Saint-Jean-Saverne, and Ernolsheim-lès-Saverne in Bas-Rhin. In September 2010, RFF awarded a €184.3 million design-build contract for Lot 47 to a consortium of 13 companies, led by Dodin Campenon-Bernard. The Saverne Tunnel was built by Spie Batignolles and Dodin Campenon-Bernard, at a cost of approximately €200 million.

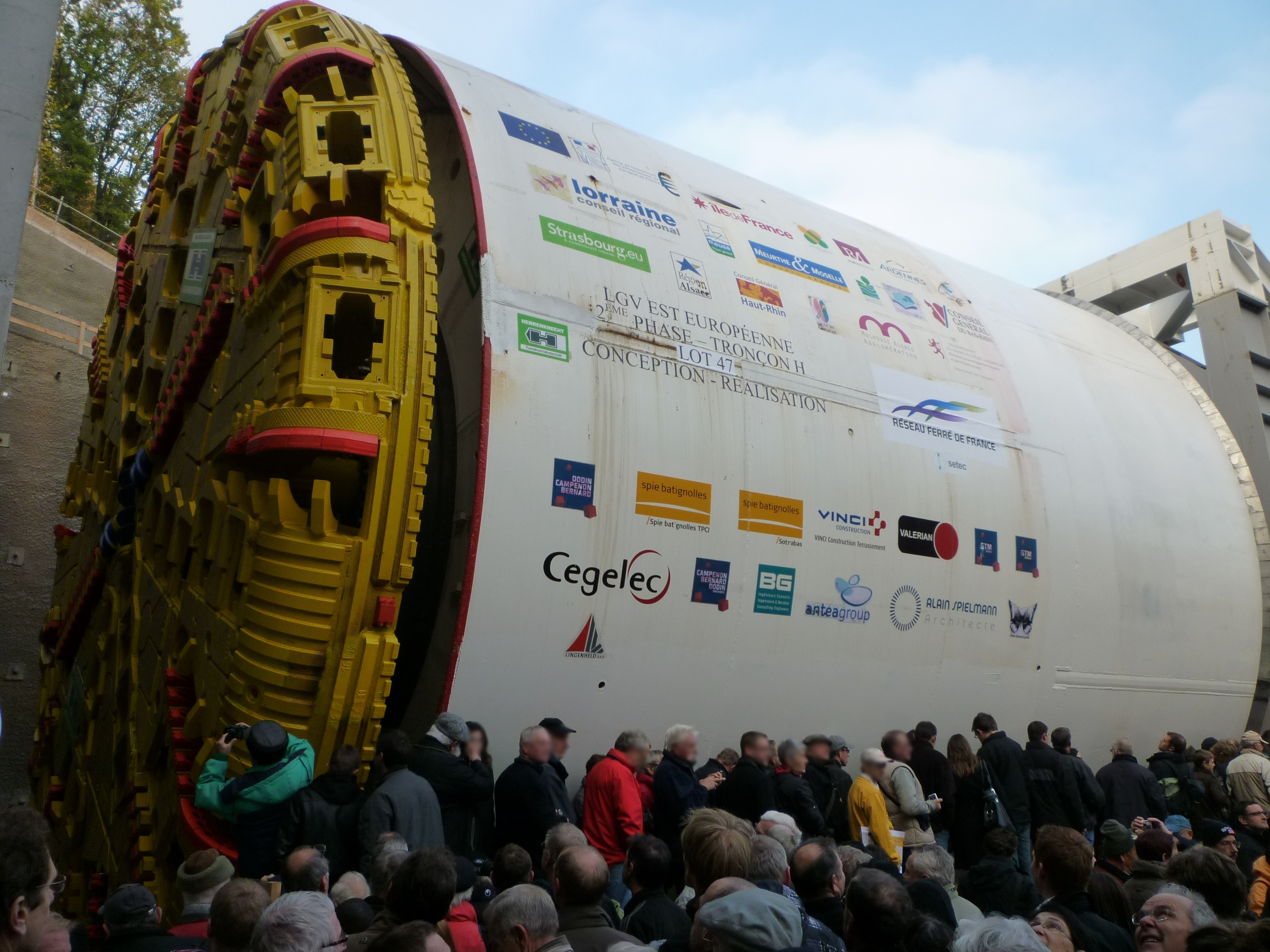
The tunnel boring machine prior to the start of excavation work

The two bores of the Saverne Tunnel were excavated with a 110 m (360 ft), 2,200-tonne (2,400-ton) tunnel boring machine (TBM), manufactured by Herrenknecht. The TBM was used to excavate 3,820 m (12,530 ft) of the 4,200 m (13,800 ft) tunnel, the remainder consisting of false tunnel constructed at both ends. The TBM was christened Charlotte—in honor of a girl from a nearby village—in a ceremony on 25 October 2011. It began excavation of the first bore on 10 November 2011 from the eastern side of Mont Saint-Michel and completed the first bore over a month ahead of schedule on 19 June 2012. For the first bore, 1932 rings were installed, using 15,456 precast concrete lining segments (8 per ring). The TBM excavated 307,000 cubic metres (10,800,000 cu ft) of earth at an average speed of 20 m (66 ft) per day.

Excavation of the second bore began on 26 September 2012 and finished on 25 February 2013. The 730,000 m^{3} (26,000,000 cu ft) of earth excavated during tunneling was used to construct embankments in nearby sections of the LGV Est line. In total, 30,960 precast concrete lining segments were used. Concreting of the final interconnecting passage was completed on 24 June 2013, marking the end of construction of the tunnel walls. On 14 April 2014, civil engineering work on the tunnel was completed, but railroad signaling and equipment still needed to be installed.

Service on the LGV Est line was originally scheduled to begin on 3 April 2016; however, a fatal accident that occurred elsewhere on the new line in November 2015 during commissioning tests delayed the opening of the line until 3 July 2016.

== Characteristics ==
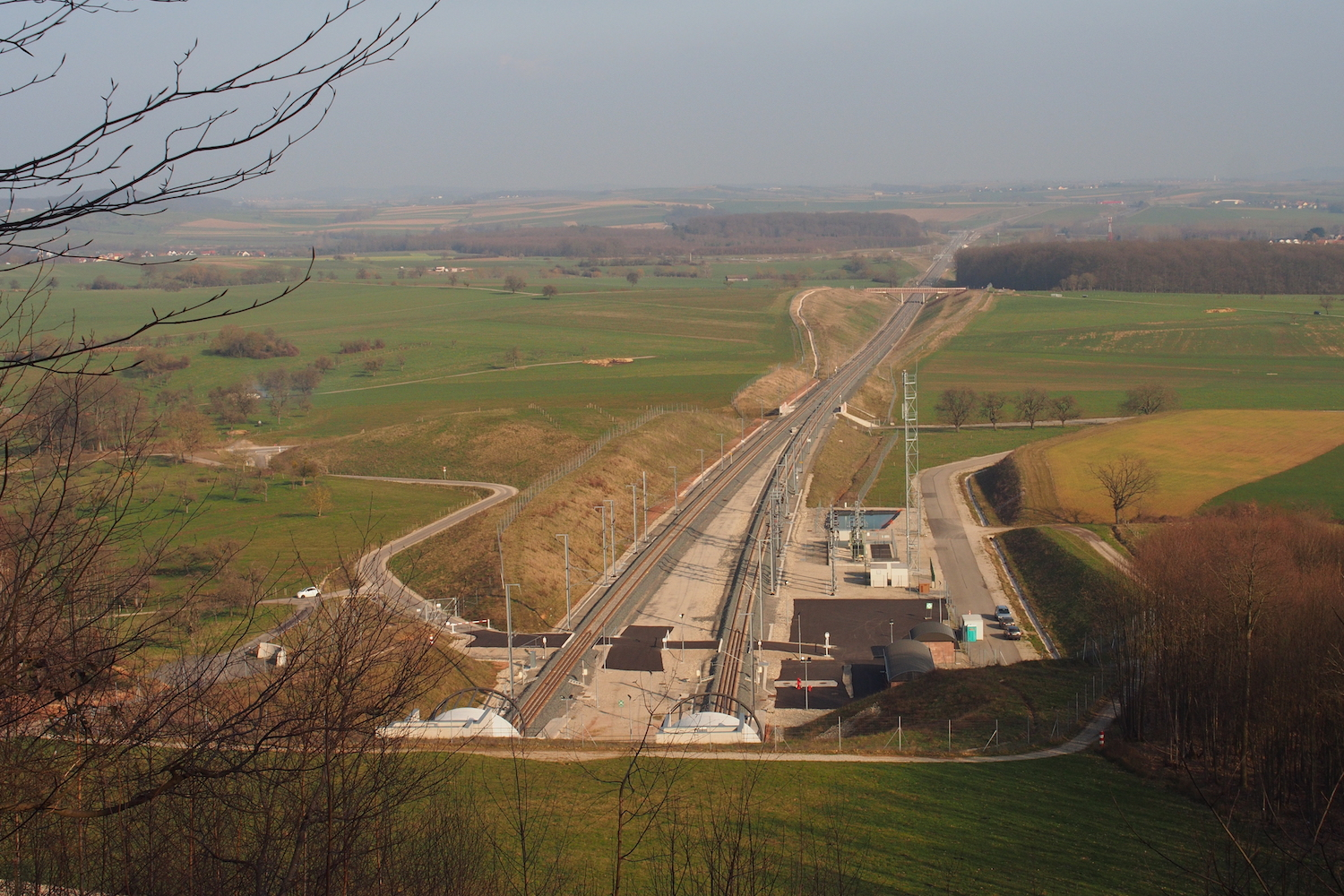
West portal of the tunnel

The tunnel lies beneath Mont Saint-Michel, beside the Col de Saverne, and within the Northern Vosges Regional Nature Park, a Natura 2000 site.

It is located close to the border with the department of Moselle and within three communes of the department of Bas-Rhin: Eckartswiller, Saint-Jean-Saverne, Ernolsheim-lès-Saverne.

The tunnel is part of the LGV Est high-speed rail line, which connects Paris with Strasbourg. The line is also a part of the Main line for Europe trans-European high-speed rail line from Paris to Bratislava, Slovakia.

The tunnel is 4,200 m (13,800 ft) in length and consists of two bores, each carrying one rail line flanked by a maintenance walkway and an emergency evacuation walkway. The two bores are connected every 500 m (1,600 ft) by an interconnecting passage. The tunnel has been built for a maximum speed of 350 kilometres per hour (220 mph)—320 km/h (200 mph) in commercial operation. It is remotely monitored from the SNCF Réseau command center at Pagny-sur-Moselle.

Adjacent to the western portal, the LGV Est traverses the 270 m (890 ft) Haspelbaechel viaduct, which travels up to 35 m (115 ft) above the Haspelbaechel valley.
