= 1998 in rail transport =

This article lists events related to rail transport that occurred in 1998.

== Events ==
=== January events ===
- January 28 - Sofia Metro Line 1 entered into service.

=== February events ===
- February 11- The Illinois Central Railroad was purchased by the Canadian National Railway but maintained independent operations for the next seventeen months before being integrated into the CN.
- February 14 – Yaoundé train explosion – A freight train passing through Yaoundé, Cameroon, collides with another freight; some tank cars carrying fuel oil are ruptured in the derailment. The oil is ignited by a lit cigarette causing a flash fire and an explosion when the flames reach the tank cars, killing 120 people.
- February 20 – The Dakota, Minnesota and Eastern Railroad files an application with the Surface Transportation Board to build new railroad track to haul coal from the Powder River Basin in Wyoming.

=== March events ===
- March 6 – The Jyväskylä rail accident occurred in Jyväskylä, Finland, when an express train from Turku bound for Joensuu via Pieksämäki derailed. Of the 300 on board, the driver and nine passengers were killed, and 94 were injured.

=== April events ===
- April 1 – British trainload freight operator EWS takes over rail operations of National Power.
- April 4 – The Fatuha train crash in India was caused by the removal of fishplates leading to the packed Howrah–Danapur express jumping tracks, killing at least 11 people.
- April 27 – Spain's Madrid Metro opens the section between Esperanza and Mar de Cristal on Line 4.

=== June events ===
- June 3 – The Eschede train disaster, the worst railroad accident in German history, occurs when a wheel on the high-speed IntercityExpress breaks; the derailed train's forward momentum caused it to slam into a bridge pier which increased the damage to the train and caused a higher injury toll than would otherwise have occurred.
- June 6 – The majority of Conrail's railroad assets are split between CSX Transportation and Norfolk Southern.
- June 19 – The government of Panama relinquishes control of the Panama Railway to the Panama Canal Railway Company, a subsidiary of Kansas City Southern.
- June 23 – Road-rail (dual gauge) Jamuna Bridge opened, connecting the previously isolated east and west networks of Bangladesh Railway.

=== July events ===
- July 11 - Expansion of LRT STAR Line from Sultan Ismail to Sri Petaling, in Kuala Lumpur, Malaysia, in preparation for the 1998 Commonwealth Games.

=== August events ===
- August 1 - Malaysia's second metro line, the LRT PUTRA Line (Chinese: 布特拉轻快铁), begins partial service from Pasar Seni to Kelana Jaya.

=== September events ===
- September 12 – The Westside Line of Portland's MAX light rail system, running west to Hillsboro, Oregon, opens.
- September – Construction begins to convert the Anton Anderson Memorial Tunnel in Alaska from rail traffic only to combined rail and highway traffic.

=== October events ===
- October 8 – Norway's first high-speed railway, Gardermobanen between Oslo S via Oslo Airport, Gardermoen to Eidsvoll, opens.
- October 15 – Paris Métro opens first section of new Line 14 from Madeleine to Bibliothèque François Mitterrand, Paris, France, its first fully automated line.
- October 18 – The Altamont Commuter Express begins regional commuter rail service between Stockton in California's Central Valley and San Jose in the San Francisco Bay Area.

=== November events ===
- November 9 – The St. Thomas and Eastern Railway begins operations on a former Canadian National Railway branch line between St. Thomas and Delhi, Ontario.
- November 20 – The Okanagan Valley Railway begins operations on the former Canadian Pacific Railway branch between Sicamous and Kelowna, British Columbia.
- November 26 – The Khanna rail disaster in India kills 212 people.

=== December events ===
- December – Railways in Germany are attacked by the extortionist Klaus-Peter Sabotta. An Intercity Express line is sabotaged (but the train does not derail), while a freight train is derailed near Anklam.
- December 5 – Trinity Railway Express in Texas adds Saturday train schedules to its timetables and begins operating the first regular Saturday trains.
- December 10 – The Surface Transportation Board gives preliminary approval to Dakota, Minnesota and Eastern Railroad's application to build into the Powder River Basin, pending completion of an Environmental Impact Statement.
- December 12 - In Kuala Lumpur, Malaysia, the LRT STAR Line expands again, from PWTC to Sentul Timur. This is the line's last expansion until 2016.

=== Unknown date events ===
- The former Lima Locomotive Works erecting shed and heavy Shay locomotive shops are razed.

== Accidents ==
- May 12 – A Norfolk Southern conductor saved a little girl by kicking her off the tracks in front on his oncoming train while he was still on it in Lafayette, Indiana. The girl, who had wandered away from her home a couple blocks away, had only minor injuries.

== Deaths ==
=== September deaths ===
- September 9 – James B. McCahey, Jr., president of Chicago South Shore and South Bend Railroad (b. 1920).

== Awards ==
=== North America ===
1998 E. H. Harriman Awards

Group	Gold medal	Silver medal	Bronze medal
A	Norfolk Southern Railway		
B			
C			
S&T			

Awards presented by Railway Age magazine

- 1998 Railroader of the Year: David R. Goode (NS)
- 1998 Regional Railroad of the Year: Texas Mexican Railway
- 1998 Short Line Railroad of the Year: St. Lawrence and Atlantic Railroad
