= 2016 in rail transport =

This article lists events related to rail transport that occurred in 2016.

== Events ==
=== January ===
- (United States) January 22–24 – In anticipation of heavy snowfall and preparation for the effects of winter storm Jonas, WMATA shuts down all services for the weekend. Metrorail services are suspended completely for two days and restored to normal service in phases up until January 29. During the shutdown, trains are stored in the system's subway tunnels to shelter them from the storm.
- (United States) January 23 – The First Hill Streetcar line opens in Seattle.
- (Brazil) January 31 – Baixada Santista Light Rail operations begin.

=== February ===
- February 9 – Bad Aibling rail accident: Two Meridian trains are in a head-on collision at Bad Aibling in southeastern Germany, leaving 12 people dead and 85 injured, due to a train dispatcher's errors.
- (United States) February 27 – The DC Streetcar opens in Washington, D.C., after several years of delays.

=== March ===
- (United States) March 5 – The Gold Line Foothill Extension in Los Angeles County, California opens, extending the Metro Rail light rail system by 11.5 miles (18.5 km) to Azusa, California.
- March 16 – The entire Washington Metro system, the second-largest subway system in the United States, is shut down on a weekday for 24 hours during emergency inspections of jumper cables in tunnels. The shutdown follows an electrical fire caused by a jumper cable two days prior.
- (United States) March 19
  - The first phase of Valley Metro Rail's Northwest Extension in Phoenix, Arizona opens.
  - Sound Transit opens a Link light rail extension in Seattle, Washington to the University of Washington campus.
- (Belgium) March 22 – 2016 Brussels bombings: 21 are killed by a terrorist suicide bomb in a subway car at Maelbeek/Maalbeek metro station.
- March 26 – The first segment of the Hokkaido Shinkansen opens, bringing high-speed rail service to Hokkaido, following the final run of an overnight locomotive-hauled train in Japan.

=== April ===
- (United Kingdom) April 1 – Arriva Rail North takes over the Northern franchise in England from Northern Rail.
- (India) April 5 – Indian Railways (Northern Railway zone) inaugurates the semi-high-speed luxury Gatimaan Express between Delhi Hazrat Nizamuddin railway station and Agra Cantonment.
- April 9 – Rail transport in Cambodia: Passenger services between Phnom Penh and the southern city of Sihanoukville resume after a 14-year suspension.
- April 9-10 – Central Railway runs the last train in India under DC traction over Harbour Line between Kurla (11:36 PM) and CST (12:24 AM), making it an end of a 91-year DC traction era.
- (Azerbaijan) April 19 – The Purple Line of the Baku Metro is extended from Avtovağzal to Memar Ajami (Baku Metro).
- (United States) April 22 – The A Line in Denver, Colorado, an electrified commuter rail link between Union Station and Denver International Airport owned by RTD, begins service.

=== May ===
- (United States) May 20 – The second phase of the Expo Line light rail in Los Angeles, California opens, extending the line to Santa Monica.
- (India) (Spain) May 30 – Indian Railways conducts trials with Renfe for Talgo coaches at speeds up to 180 kmph on the Mumbai–Delhi line.

=== June ===
- (Switzerland) June 1 – Opening of the Gotthard Base Tunnel, the world's longest and deepest rail tunnel.
- (United States) June 4 – Beginning of "SafeTrack" program by the Washington Metropolitan Area Transit Authority, to conduct emergency maintenance on the aging Washington Metro system, with expected single-tracking and shutdowns scheduled to last until March 2017.
- (United States) June 6 – Opening of the Perris Valley extension of the 91/Perris Valley Line, a commuter rail line operated by Metrolink in Southern California, from Riverside to Perris.
- (Japan) June 19 – JR Kyushu phases out the 485 series.
- (United Kingdom) June 19 – Opening of Kirkstall Forge railway station in England, close to the site of the earlier station with the same name (1860–1905).
- June – The last locomotives are removed from the strategic steam reserve in Sweden in working order.
- (Malaysia) June 30 – Full opening of LRT Ampang Line and Kelana Jaya Line extension line operated by RapidKL.

=== July ===
- July 1 – Taiwan High Speed Rail Nangang Station opens.
- (France) July 3 – Phase 2 of LGV Est, including the Saverne Tunnel, opens, extending the line from Baudrecort to Vendenheim near Strasbourg.
- July 12 – Andria-Corato train collision: at least 23 people are killed and 50 injured by the head-on collision of two passenger trains on a single-track railroad in the Apulia region of Italy.
- (United States) July 25 – Opening of the B Line commuter rail system in Denver, Colorado.
- (Nigeria) (China) July 26 – The Chinese-built Kaduna–Abuja section of the high-speed Lagos–Kano Standard Gauge Railway starts operation.

=== September ===
- (United States) September 9 – Cincinnati Bell Connector opens to the public with a free-ride weekend after years of planning and building, bringing streetcar service back to Cincinnati for the first time since the 1950s.
- (Russia) September 10 – Moscow Central Circle, a S-Bahn style urban railway line, starts operation. Being integrated in Moscow metro infrastructure, it was launched as metro's line 14.
- (United States) September 24 – Angle Lake station near Seattle, Washington opens, extending Link light rail service past SeaTac Airport.
- (United States) September 30 – The Wachusett station near Boston, Massachusetts, begins limited service, with full service beginning in November. The new station extends the MBTA Commuter Rail system by 4.5 miles (7.2 km).

=== October ===
- (Hong Kong) October 23 – Kwun Tong line extension opens.
- (United States) October 24 – Opening of the South Oak Cliff extension of the Dallas Area Rapid Transit Blue Line to University of North Texas at Dallas.

=== November ===
- (United States) November 8 – Major mass transit expansions are approved by voters in U.S. cities, including Los Angeles (Measure M), Seattle (Sound Transit 3), and Atlanta.
- (India) November 20 – Pukhrayan train derailment: Indian Railways' Indore–Patna Express derails at Pukhrayan near Kanpur with at least 146 fatalities.
- (Norway) November 28 – The double-track high-speed section from Larvik to Porsgrunn on the Vestfold Line, including the Holmestrandsporten, opens for service.

=== December ===
- (Canada) December 2 – The Evergreen Extension of the Vancouver Skytrain opens, extending the Millennium Line 10.9 kilometres (6.8 mi) to Coquitlam.
- (Poland) December 11 – Reopening of Łódź Fabryczna station after 5 years of reconstruction.
- (Malaysia) December 16 – Opening of MRT Sungai Buloh-Kajang Line Phase 1 connecting Sungai Buloh to Semantan.
- December 28 – The South Island line of Hong Kong's MTR metro system opens, connecting Admiralty station to the Southern District.
