= Meridian (commuter rail) =

German commuter rail service (2013–2020)

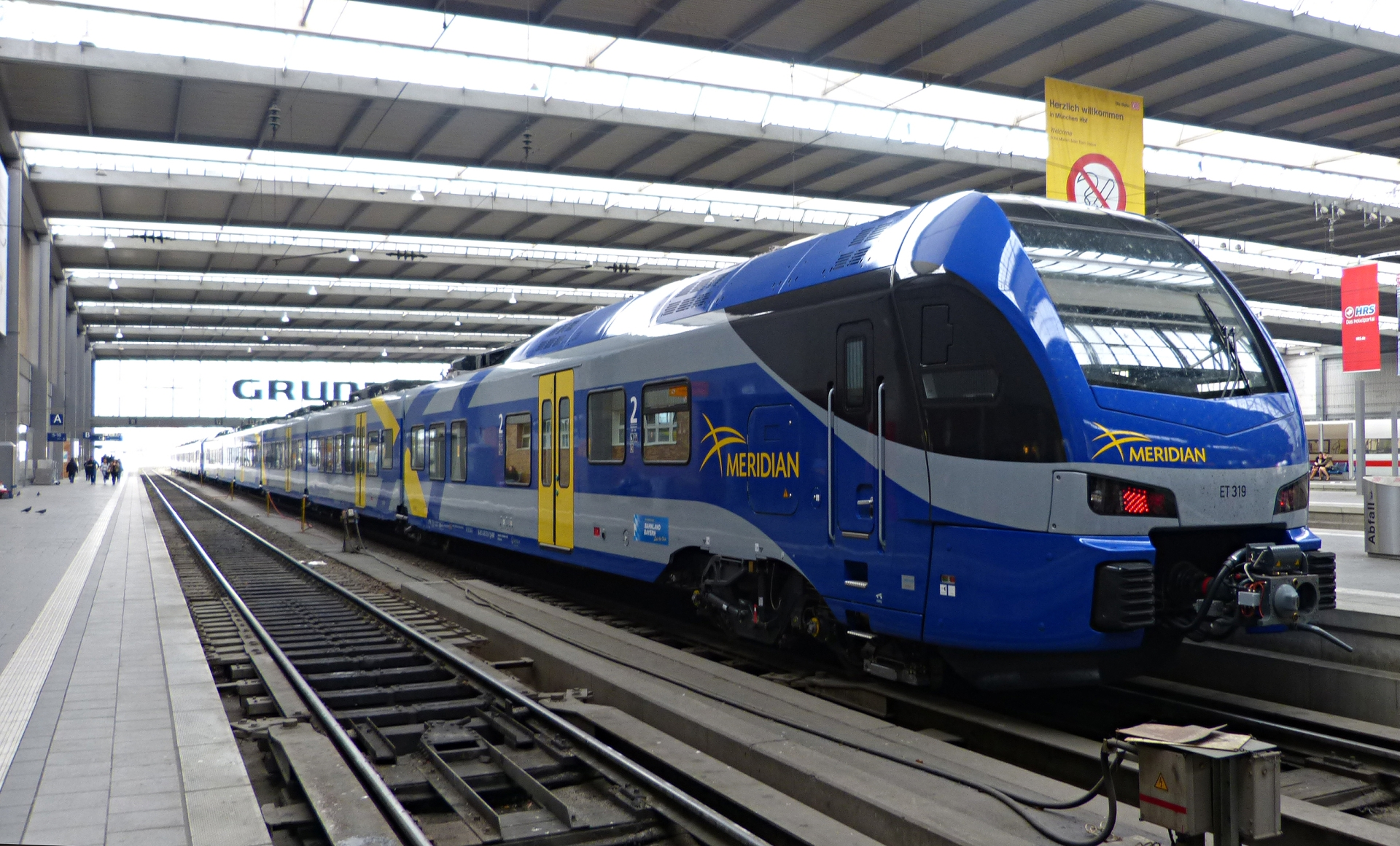
- EMU ET 319 at Munich's main railway station

Overview
- Main regions: Bavaria, Germany
- Fleet: Stadler FLIRT3 EMUs
- Stations called at: Munich Hbf; Rosenheim; Kufstein; Salzburg Hbf
- Parent company: Bayerische Oberlandbahn; Transdev
- Successor: Bayerische Regiobahn

Technical
- Track gauge: 1,435 mm (4 ft 8 1/2 in) standard gauge

Other
- Website: www.der-meridian.de

Meridian was a commuter rail service that operated between 2013 and 2020 in Bavaria, Germany operated by the railway company Bayerische Oberlandbahn (BOB), owned by Transdev.

Since June 2020 these services run under the brand Bayerische Regiobahn (BRB) of Transdev.

== History ==
In 2011 Bayerische Eisenbahngesellschaft signed a contract with Transdev (then Veolia Transport) to operate the "E-network Rosenheim" from December 2013, replacing previous operator DB Regio Bayern.

Since December 2013 Meridian operated three lines in Bavaria, from Munich to Salzburg, Rosenheim and Kufstein.

== Services ==
Services run out of Munich on the Munich–Rosenheim and Munich–Holzkirchen railway lines, and out of Rosenheim on the Rosenheim–Salzburg, Rosenheim–Kufstein and Mangfall Valley lines.

Meridian operated a fleet of 35 FLIRT3 electric multiple units from Stadler Rail.

== 2016 collision ==
On 9 February 2016 the Bad Aibling rail accident occurred at Bad Aibling, Bavaria, in southeastern Germany. Two Meridian-branded trains were involved in a head-on collision on the single-track line in which 12 people were killed and 89 others were injured.
