= Mont Saint-Michel (Alsace) =

Hill in the Vosges mountains of France

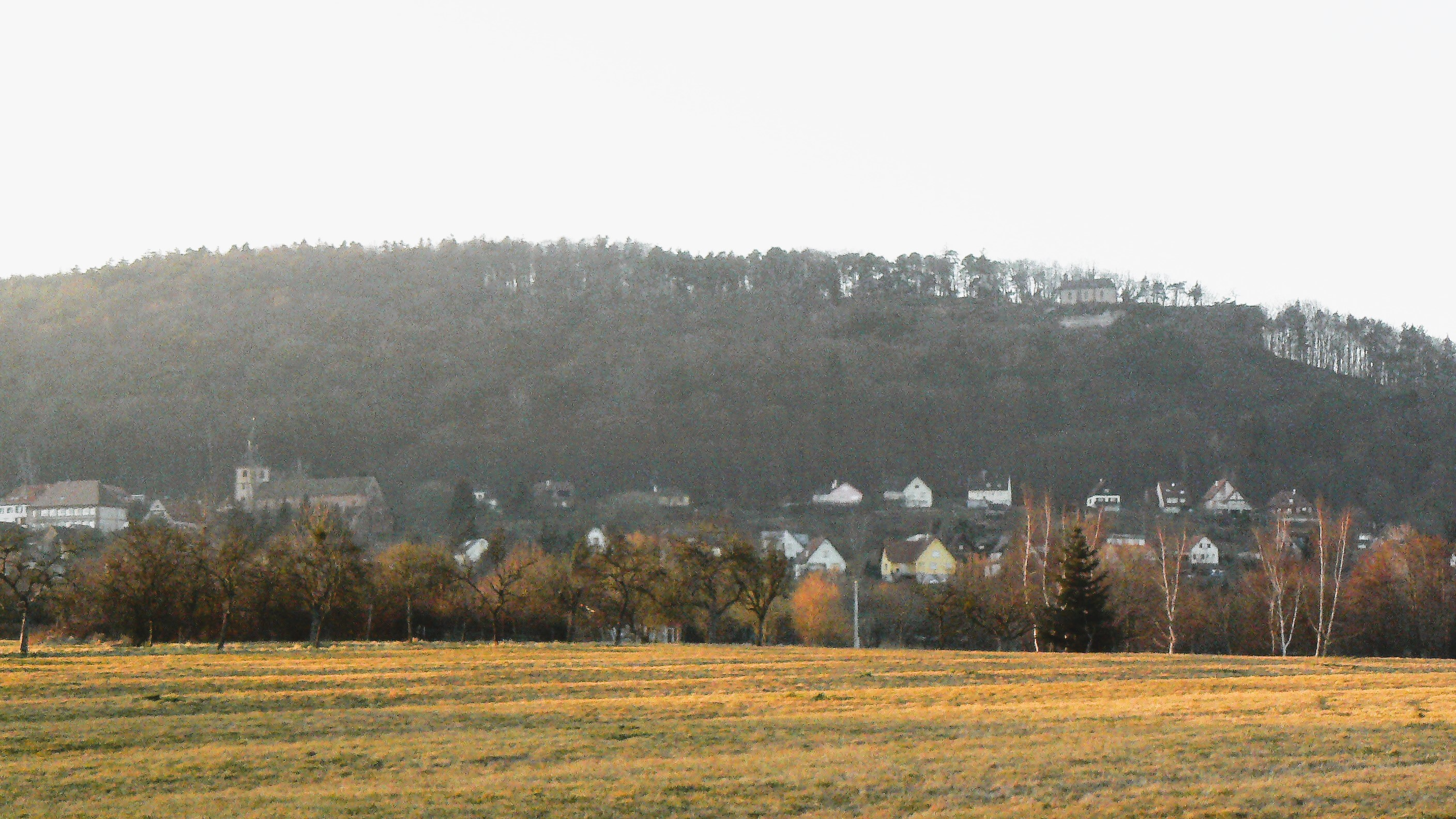
- Mont Saint-Michel seen from Saint-Jean-Saverne

Highest point
- Elevation: 437 m (1,434 ft)
- Coordinates: 48°46′28″N 7°20′51″E

Geography
- Location within France
- Location: Alsace, France
- Parent range: Vosges

Mont Saint-Michel (French pronunciation: [mɔ̃ sɛ̃ miʃɛl]; German: Michaelsberg) is a hill, 437 metres high, in the Vosges mountains in the French region of Alsace. It rises above the town and abbey of Saint-Jean-Saverne (St. Johann bei Zabern). It is home to a St. Michael's Shrine like its more famous cousin in Normandy, but historically is not related to it.

== Literature ==
- Jean-Joseph Ring: Promenades historiques et archéologiques autour de Saverne. Saverne, 2000, ISSN 1159-4705
