= Danne-et-Quatre-Vents =

- Commune
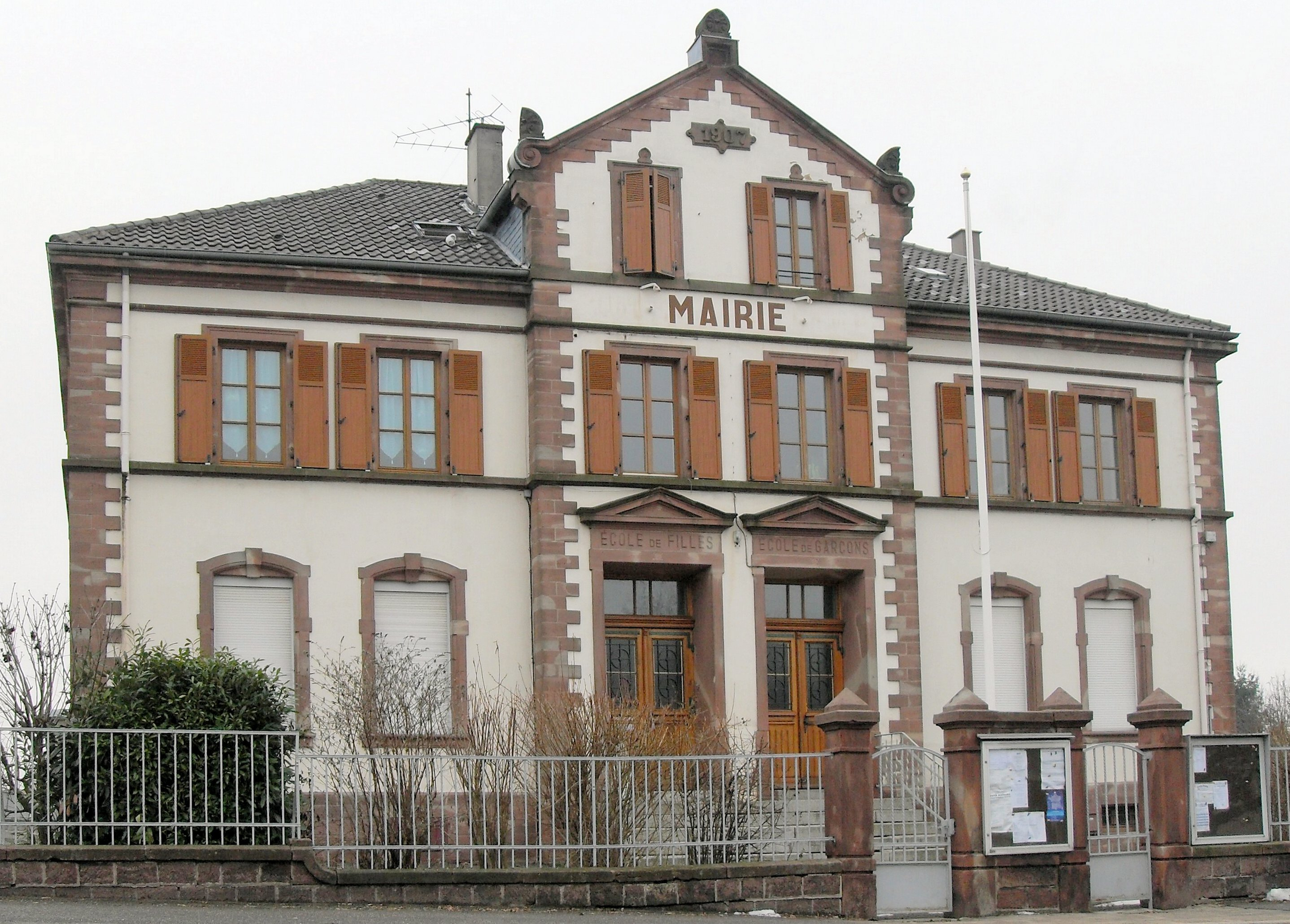
- The town hall in Danne-et-Quatre-Vents

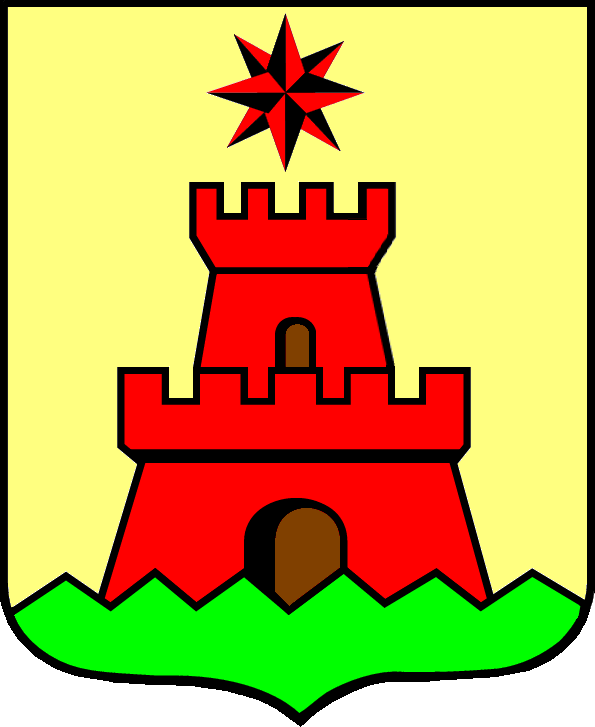
- Coat of arms
- Location of Danne-et-Quatre-Vents
- Location within France Location within Grand Est
- Coordinates: 48°46′02″N 7°17′43″E
- Country: France
- Region: Grand Est
- Department: Moselle
- Arrondissement: Sarrebourg-Château-Salins
- Canton: Phalsbourg
- Intercommunality: CC du Pays de Phalsbourg

Government
  - Mayor (2020–2026): Jean-Luc Jacob
- Area^{1}: 7.2 km^{2} (2.8 sq mi)
- Elevation: 350 m (1,150 ft)
- Highest elevation: 379 m (1,243 ft)
- Lowest elevation: 205 m (673 ft)
- Population (2023): 670
  - Density: 93/km^{2} (240/sq mi)
- Time zone: UTC+01:00 (CET)
  - Summer (DST): UTC+02:00 (CEST)
- INSEE/Postal code: 57168 /57370
- ^{1} French Land Register data, which excludes lakes, ponds, glaciers > 1 km^{2} (0.386 sq mi or 247 acres) and river estuaries.

Danne-et-Quatre-Vents (French pronunciation: [dan e katʁ vɑ̃]; German: Dann und Vierwinden) is a commune in the Moselle department in Grand Est in north-eastern France.

== Geography ==
The municipal territory is delimited from north-east to south-east by the departmental border that separates the Moselle from the Bas-Rhin. To the south, the river Zorn serves as a natural border between the communal territories of Danne and Hultehouse.

It is the only place where the altitude of the Lorraine plateau is equal to that of the Vosges Mountains. Therefor, this place has been for millennia, the privileged crossing between the Lorraine plateau and the plain of Alsace. Thus the Roman road, now a national road, is now doubled by the A4 motorway. The railway at the bottom of a valley passes the East European LGV through the Saverne tunnel, connecting Danne-et-Quatre-Vents to Saint-Jean-Saverne.

== History ==
This commune is the result of the union of the village of Danne with the hamlet of Quatre-Vents. Its first lords were the Counts of Lutzelbourg, who sold it in 1611 to the House of Lorraine. A few decades later, in 1661, the Duchy of Lorraine ceded Danne-et-Quatre-Vents to the Kingdom of France in accordance with the Treaty of Vincennes.

The commune was integrated into Alsace-Lorraine following the French defeat in the Franco-Prussian War of 1870, then returned to France following the First World War in 1918.

== Historical, cultural and architectural heritage ==
The commune houses the chapel Notre-Dame-de-Bonne-Fontaine, whose origin dates back to the Thirty Years' War. In 1638, the Croats destroyed the chapel. In 1715, it was rebuilt by soldiers healed of a serious illness in Phalsbourg.

The remains of a Roman road and a medieval fortified house of 1347 are observable in Danne-et-Quatre-Vents.

== See also ==
- Communes of the Moselle department
