= Kirkby train crash =

2021 railway crash in the United Kingdom

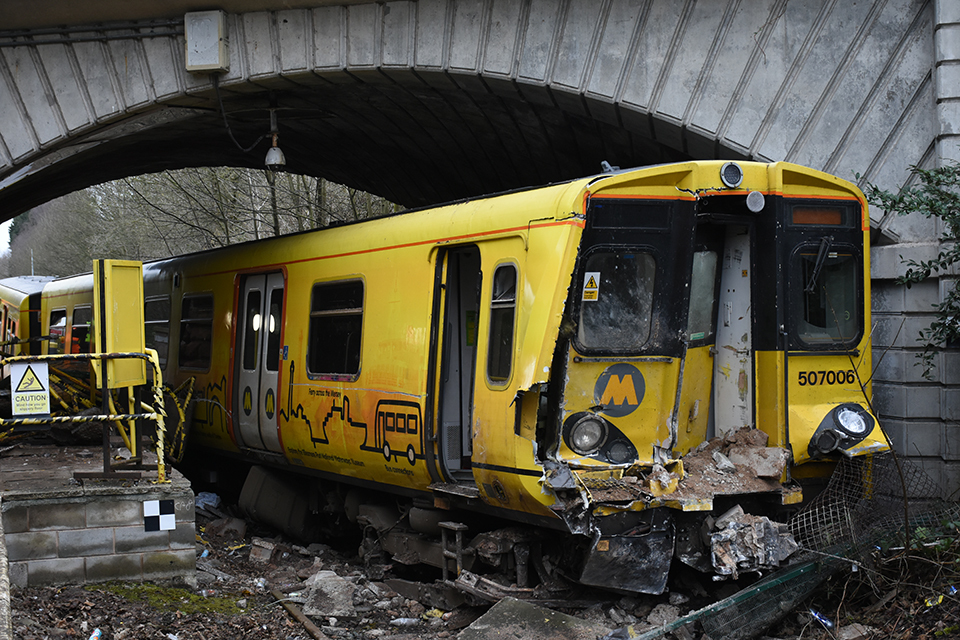
- The aftermath of the crash, photograph taken the following day

Details
- Date: 13 March 2021; 18:52
- Location: Kirkby, Merseyside, England
- Coordinates: 53.4867°N 2.9017°W
- Country: United Kingdom
- Line: Northern line
- Operator: Merseyrail
- Incident type: Collision with buffer stop
- Cause: Distracted driver

Statistics
- Trains: 1
- Passengers: 12
- Crew: 2
- Deaths: 0
- Injured: 1
- Damage: £450,000 (station)

On 13 March 2021, a Class 507 train operated by Merseyrail collided with the buffer stops at Kirkby railway station in Merseyside, England. The train had passed the start of the 15 mph (24 km/h) speed restriction for the station whilst coasting at 41 mph (66 km/h). The driver later applied the emergency brakes, but the train still collided with the buffer stop at 29 mph (47 km/h).

The only person injured was the driver of the train, Phillip Hollis, who was found to have been distracted by using his mobile phone before the crash. He was dismissed from Merseyrail and later prosecuted, pleading guilty to a charge of endangering the safety of people on the railway, for which he received a 12-month suspended sentence. The Rail Accident Investigation Branch investigated the accident and made recommendations including researching systems to measure driver alertness and further assessing the risk of buffer stop collisions on the Merseyrail network.

== Background ==
The station at Kirkby opened on 20 November 1848 as part of the Liverpool and Bury Railway, which had been authorised on 31 July 1845 between Liverpool and Bolton. In 1977, the then-British Rail line was split at Kirkby, with Merseyrail trains running from Liverpool and British Rail trains from Wigan. At the time of the accident, buffer stops were located on the end of each line, with a passenger walkway between the two. Through-running at Kirkby was restored in 2023, when the Merseyrail line was extended to the new Headbolt Lane station.

The train involved consisted of six cars, formed from two three-car Class 507 EMUs coupled together. It was operating 2K48, the 18:35 Merseyrail service from Liverpool Central to Kirkby, with 12 passengers and two crew onboard.

Both the train and the line were equipped with the Automatic Warning System (AWS) and Train Protection & Warning System (TPWS) safety systems. AWS magnets are located on the approach to certain line-side features, such as signs warning of upcoming speed restrictions. When the train passes over an activated on-track magnet, the AWS system provides the driver with an audible and visual alarm, which, on this class of train, automatically applies the brakes if not acknowledged within 2.5 seconds. TPWS provides, amongst other features, the Overspeed Sensor System (OSS), which can automatically stop a train if it passes over two on-track loop antennas above a certain speed. When a train passes over the first loop, an onboard timer is started; if the train then passes over the second loop within a set time, the system automatically applies the brakes. The distance between the two loops on the track determines the speed at which the train has to be travelling to trigger the system.

At the time of the accident, there was a set of OSS loops located around 300 m (980 ft) before Kirkby station to protect a change of speed restriction from 60 mph (97 km/h) to 15 mph (24 km/h), with a trigger speed set to 53 mph (85 km/h). Another set of loops was located just before the buffer stops, set to trigger at 12.5 mph (20 km/h).

The layout of Kirkby station at the time of the crash

== Crash ==
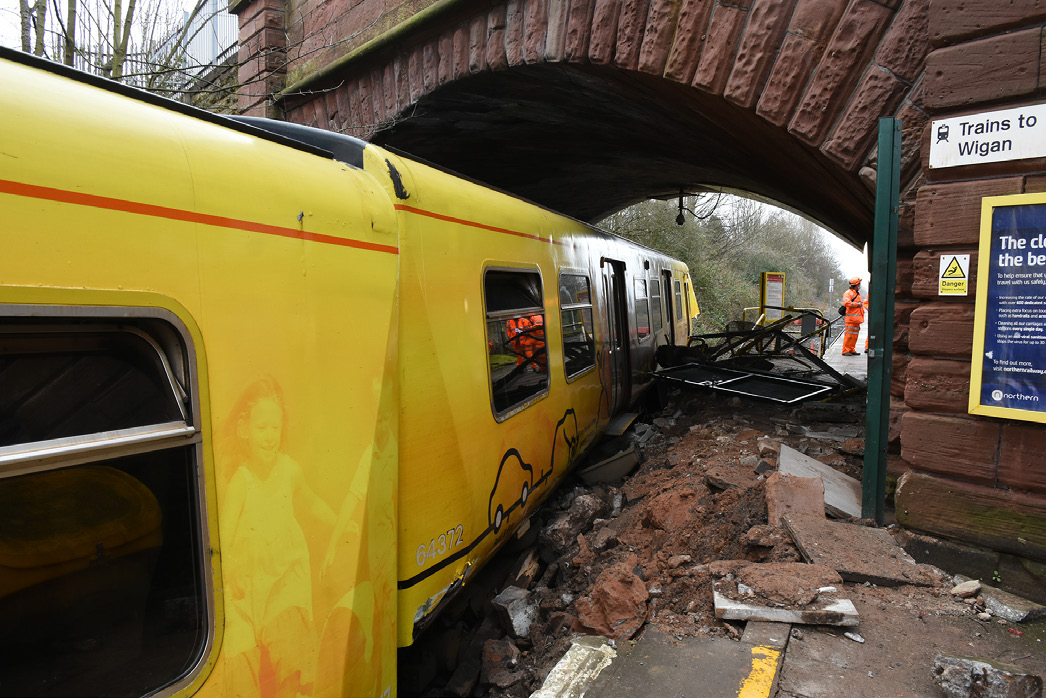
The damaged passenger walkway after the crash

The accident occurred at 18:52 on 13 March 2021, when the train crashed through the buffer stops and the passenger walkway. It stopped 28 m (92 ft) beyond the buffer stop, and 9 m (30 ft) short of the buffer stop for the other line. The emergency services were alerted at 19:01 and arrived at 19:05. Merseyside Fire and Rescue Service, the North West Ambulance Service and Merseyside Police all attended the scene. All fourteen people on board the train were checked at the scene by paramedics, and the driver was taken to hospital as a precaution.

As a result of the accident, services were suspended between Rice Lane and Kirkby. Merseyside Fire and Rescue Service had handed over control of the scene to the British Transport Police (BTP) by 21:40. The next day, replacement bus services were set up between Kirkby and Aintree. As a result of the crash, one of the units involved was withdrawn from service, and subsequently scrapped in September 2021. The station sustained £450,000 worth of damage, and reopened on 21 March.

== Investigation ==
=== Rail Accident Investigation Branch investigation ===
The Rail Accident Investigation Branch opened an investigation into the crash, and published its final report into the accident on 11 August 2022. The investigation found that the driver had left the previous station, Fazakerley, on time at 18:49:45, and then accelerated up to the maximum permissible speed of 50 mph (80 km/h). The driver kept coasting as the permissible speed increased to 60 mph (97 km/h), and did not accelerate any further.

A fixed distant signal sign (left) and a sign warning of an upcoming 15 mph speed restriction (right)

At 18:51:22, the driver acknowledged an AWS warning for a fixed distant signal sign and a sign warning of the upcoming 15 mph (24 km/h) speed restriction. At 18:51:34, a WhatsApp message was sent from the driver's phone; one second later, the train passed over the M57 motorway, which is around 900 m (3,000 ft) away from Kirkby station and is used by Merseyrail as a landmark to start braking for the station. The driver did not start braking at this point, and the train was travelling at 42 mph (68 km/h) when it passed over the set of TPWS loops protecting the 15 mph speed restriction at 18:51:58. This was below the trigger speed of 53 mph (85 km/h), so the system was not activated.

The train passed the start of the 15 mph speed restriction at 18:52:14, still travelling at 41 mph (66 km/h). At 18:52:17, the driver applied the emergency brakes around 110 m (360 ft) before the buffer stops. Three seconds later, the train passed over the set of TPWS loops protecting the buffer stops at 39 mph (63 km/h). This was above the trigger speed of 12.5 mph (20 km/h) and activated the system, but this had no effect as the emergency brakes had already been applied by the driver manually. Four seconds later, the train crashed into the buffer stops at 29 mph (47 km/h).

The driver stated that at some point between Fazakerley and Kirkby, the contents of his bag located on the opposite end of the cab had fallen onto the floor, and that he had reached over to retrieve the items. As a result of the design of the train's cab, this meant that the driver would have lost almost all view of the track whilst he did this.

The track layout between Fazakerley and Kirkby at the time of the crash

The investigation found that at least three other buffer stop collisions had occurred at Kirkby in the 35 years preceding the accident, all of which occurred before the installation of TPWS. The TPWS loops on the approach to Kirkby were intended to protect against a train not slowing down from close to the maximum permitted speed of 60 mph, and not from a speed under 53 mph. The TPWS loops just before the buffer stops were intended to protect against a low-speed misjudgement from a driver. Both sets of loops operate independently, and protect against different risk factors.

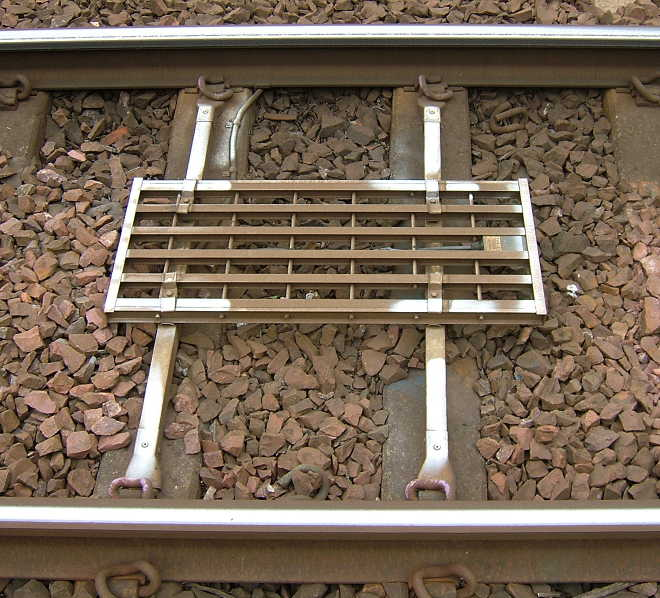
A loop antenna for the TPWS Overspeed Sensor System

Merseyrail had a generic risk assessment covering the risk of buffer stop collisions at terminal stations. It deemed this risk to be low due to factors including driver training, procedures and route knowledge. However, the assessed risk only included events where a possible consequence was either a TPWS activation or a low-speed collision; it did not include events where trains would enter the platform at speeds greater than 20 mph (32 km/h). This was possibly a result of an incomplete understanding of the capabilities of TPWS, and the fact that no crashes had occurred since the installation of TPWS. The investigation also found that Merseyrail's fatigue risk management system did not follow the latest industry guidance, although it noted that there was no indication that fatigue played any part in the crash.

Three recommendations were made in the report: further research should be undertaken into systems to measure driver alertness; the risk of buffer stop collisions should be further assessed on the Merseyrail network; and Merseyrail should review its fatigue risk management system. Two learning points were also noted: phone use whilst driving a train can lead to a significant distraction; and TPWS cannot fully eliminate the risk of over-speeding at terminal stations.

=== British Transport Police investigation ===
The British Transport Police opened an investigation into the crash. It found that the driver of the train, 59-year-old (Note: The British Transport Police news article reports that Hollis was 56 years old, whereas sources such as the Crown Prosecution Service, BBC News and Sky News report that Hollis was 59 years old.) Phillip Hollis, became distracted after sending a WhatsApp message from his phone before the collision. Hollis had received the message "RIP Murray", and replied with "A great commentator", referring to the death of Murray Walker, who had died earlier that day. He was dismissed by Merseyrail in September 2021, and was charged with endangering the safety of people on the railway in January 2022. He pleaded guilty to the offence at Liverpool Magistrates Court on 8 February, and was sentenced at Liverpool Crown Court to 12 months in prison suspended for two years, 180 hours of community service and a three-month electronic curfew on 8 March.

== See also ==
- 2008 Chatsworth train collision, crash in the United States in which a train driver was distracted by text messages on his mobile phone.
- Bad Aibling rail accident, 2016 crash in Germany caused when dispatcher was distracted by a game on his mobile phone.
- List of rail accidents (2020–present)
- List of rail accidents in the United Kingdom
