= Château du Warthenberg =

Ruined castle in Bas-Rhin, Alsace, France

Coordinates: 48.7946°N 7.3768°E

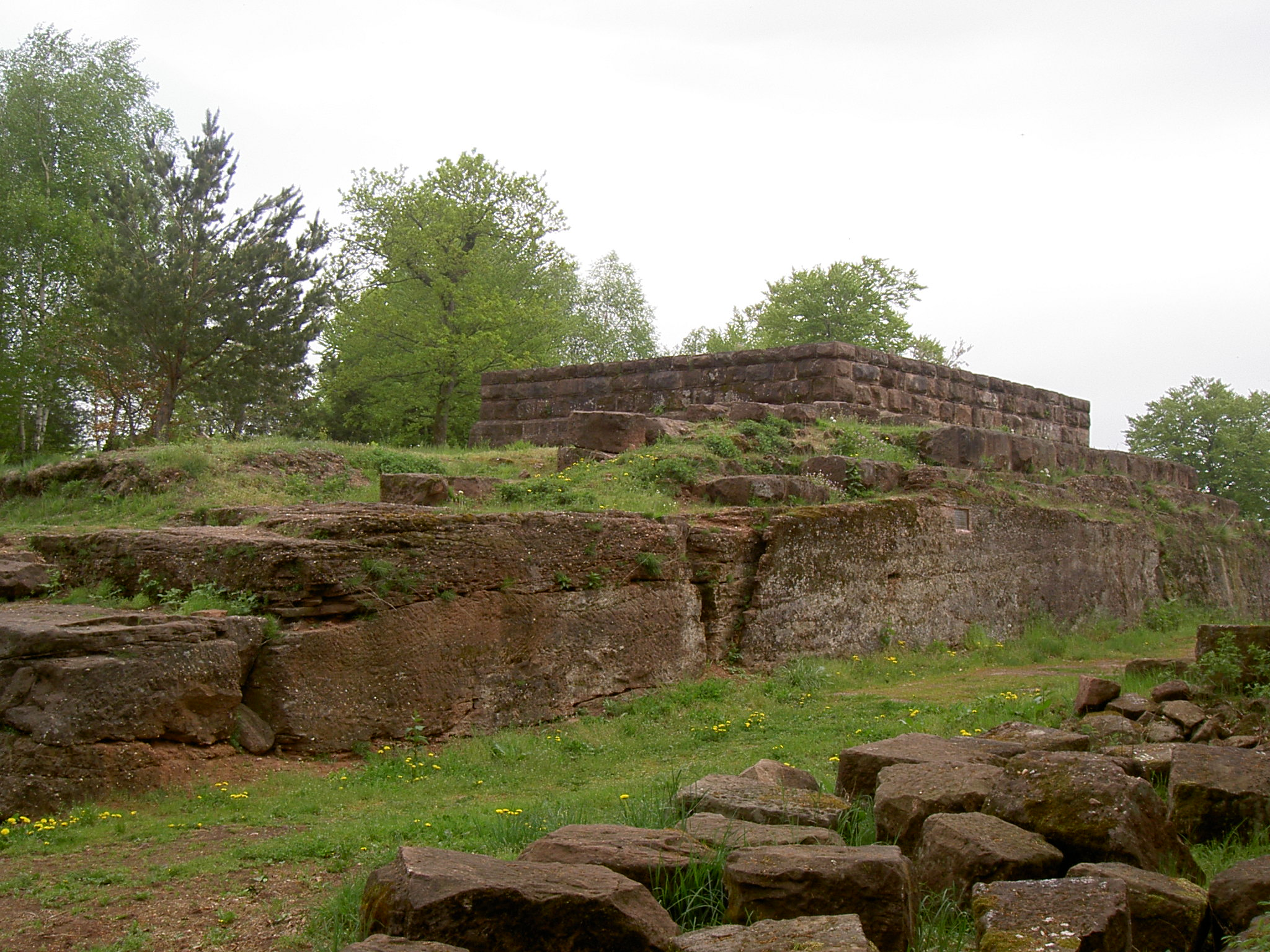
Ruins of Chateau du Warthenberg

Château du Warthenberg is a ruined castle in the commune of Ernolsheim-lès-Saverne, in the department of Bas-Rhin, Alsace, France. It is a listed historical monument since 1994.
