= Fatuha train crash =

1998 rail accident in India

Fatuha train crash (1998)

Details
- Date: 4 April 1998
- Location: Near Fatuha, Bihar
- Country: India
- Line: Howrah–Delhi main line
- Operator: Eastern Railway
- Owner: Indian Railways
- Service: Howrah–Danapur Express
- Incident type: Derailment
- Cause: Removal of fishplates

Statistics
- Trains: 1
- Deaths: 12
- Injured: over 50

The Fatuha train crash was a rail accident that occurred on 4 April 1998 near Fatuha in Bihar, India. The removal of fishplates caused the Howrah–Danapur Express to derail, killing 12 people and injuring more than 50 on the Eastern Railway's Danapur division. Nine bogies derailed, disrupting rail traffic on the route.

Local residents assisted the injured at the scene until emergency authorities arrived. The injured were taken to Patna Medical College and Hospital (PMCH), Nalanda Medical College and Hospital, and another hospital in Patna, approximately 20 km (12 mi) from the crash site, while the remaining passengers were transported to Patna via a special train. Eleven passengers died at the scene, and one later died of their injuries at PMCH.

Railway officials stated that the accident was caused prima facie by the removal of fishplates on the right side of the track.
