= Bad Aibling rail accident =

2016 train collision in Bavaria, Germany

Coordinates: 47.8486°N 12.0295°E

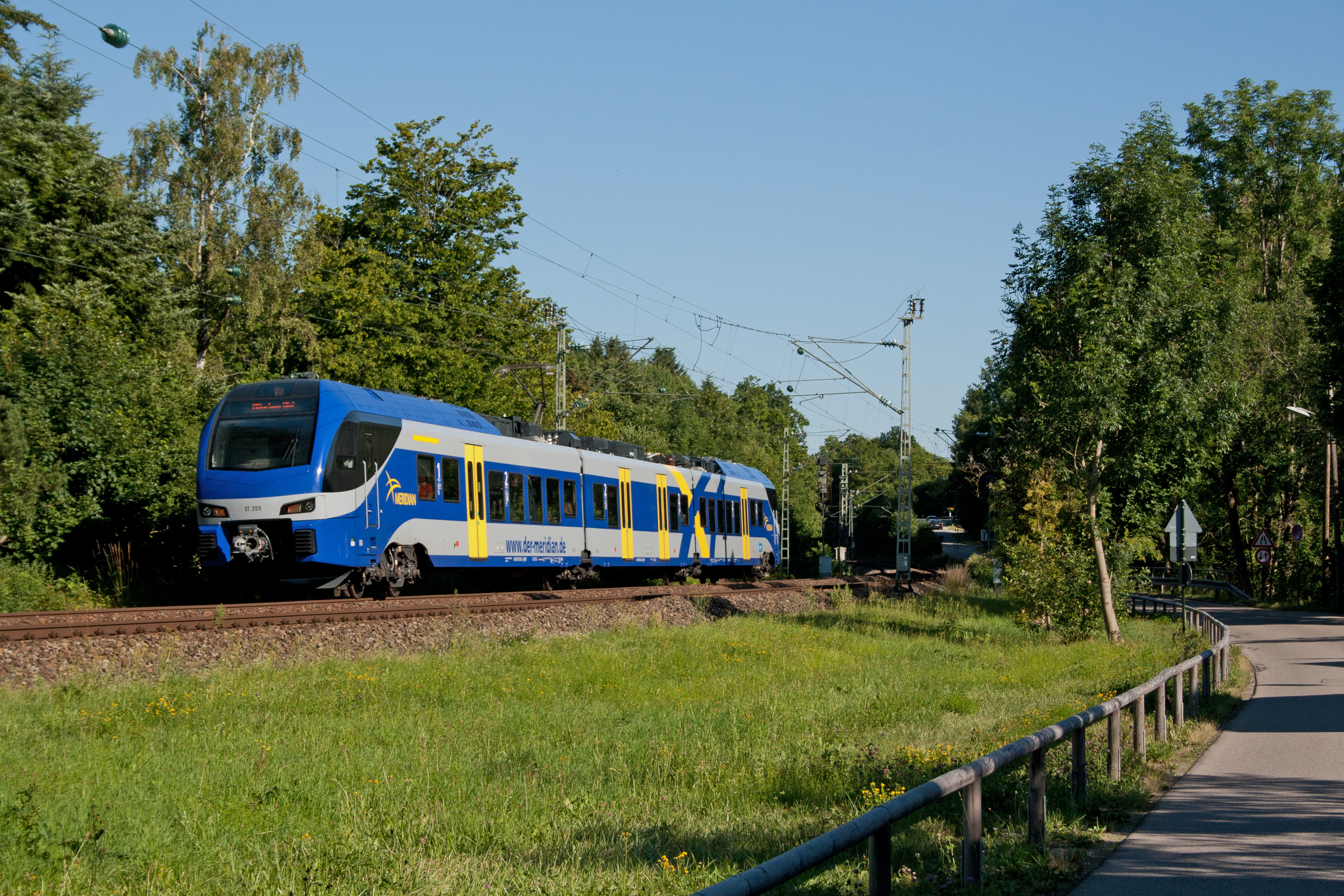
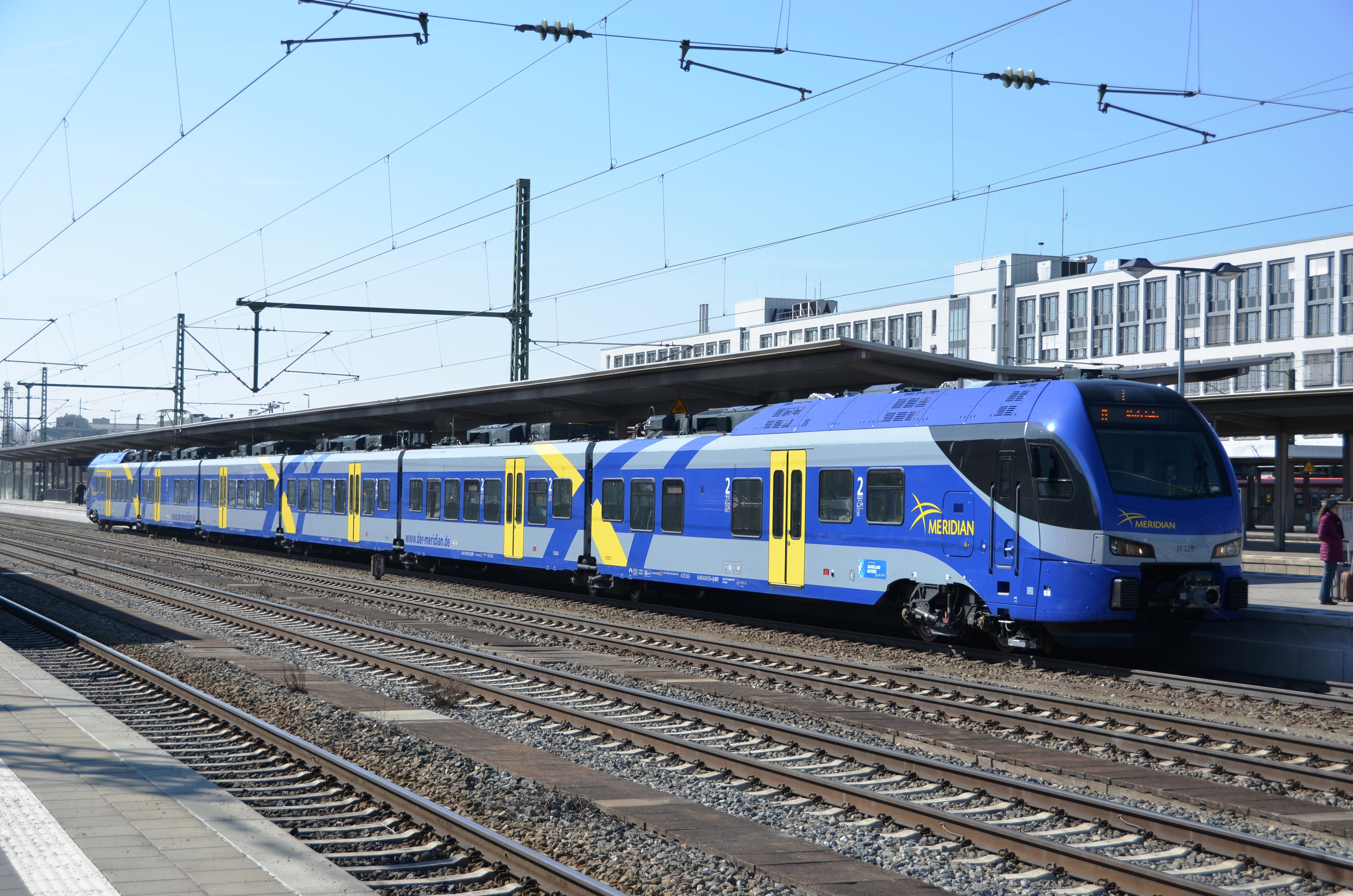
- ET 355, the westbound train, photographed in 2014 ET 325, the eastbound train, photographed in 2014

- Location within Germany Location within Bavaria

Details
- Date: 9 February 2016; 06:47 CET (05:47 UTC)
- Location: Bad Aibling, Bavaria
- Country: Germany
- Line: DB Netze Mangfall Valley Railway
- Operator: Bayerische Oberlandbahn "Meridian"
- Incident type: Head-on collision
- Cause: Signalman's error

Statistics
- Trains: 2
- Passengers: ±150
- Deaths: 12
- Injured: 85
- Damage: 200 m (650 ft) track

On 9 February 2016, two Meridian-branded passenger trains collided head-on at Bad Aibling, Germany. Of approximately 150 people on board the two trains, 12 people died and 85 others were injured, 24 critically.

Two months after the crash, investigators announced that it had been caused by a Deutsche Bahn train dispatcher who gave incorrect instructions to the two trains while distracted by a game he was playing on his mobile phone. The dispatcher further compounded his error when, upon realizing it, he tried to send emergency codes to the trains but entered the wrong combination into his computer.

== Crash ==
The incident occurred on the single-track Mangfall Valley Railway (German: Mangfalltalbahn), at a curve between the stations of Kolbermoor and Bad Aibling-Kurpark in Bavaria, close to the Bad Aibling sewage works. The two trains were Stadler FLIRT3 multiple-units, operated under the Meridian brand by the Bayerische Oberlandbahn (BOB), a subsidiary of Transdev Germany. The eastbound train was a six-car unit with 333 seats (ET 325), scheduled to run from Munich to Rosenheim, while the westbound train was a three-car unit with 158 seats (ET 355), scheduled to run from Rosenheim to Holzkirchen. There were more than 150 passengers on board the two trains, considerably fewer than usual due to carnival holidays. The trains were equipped with a total of three train event recorders. The line and both trains were equipped with the Punktförmige Zugbeeinflussung (PZB), a train protection system designed to reinforce line-side signalling and prevent drivers from accidentally passing signals at danger.

The eastbound and westbound trains were scheduled to pass each other at the Kolbermoor railway station, with the westbound train (M 79506) towards Munich scheduled to wait for five minutes for the eastbound train from Munich (M 79505) to arrive. The westbound train departed Kolbermoor on schedule but the eastbound train was four minutes behind schedule.

The two trains collided head-on at 06:46:56 CET (05:46:56 UTC). One train was travelling at 52 kilometres per hour (32 mph) and the other at 87 kilometres per hour (54 mph). A total of 11 people died, including both train drivers and several other railway employees. In total 85 people were injured; 24 injured seriously. A twelfth victim died from his injuries two months after the crash.

=== Rescue operation ===
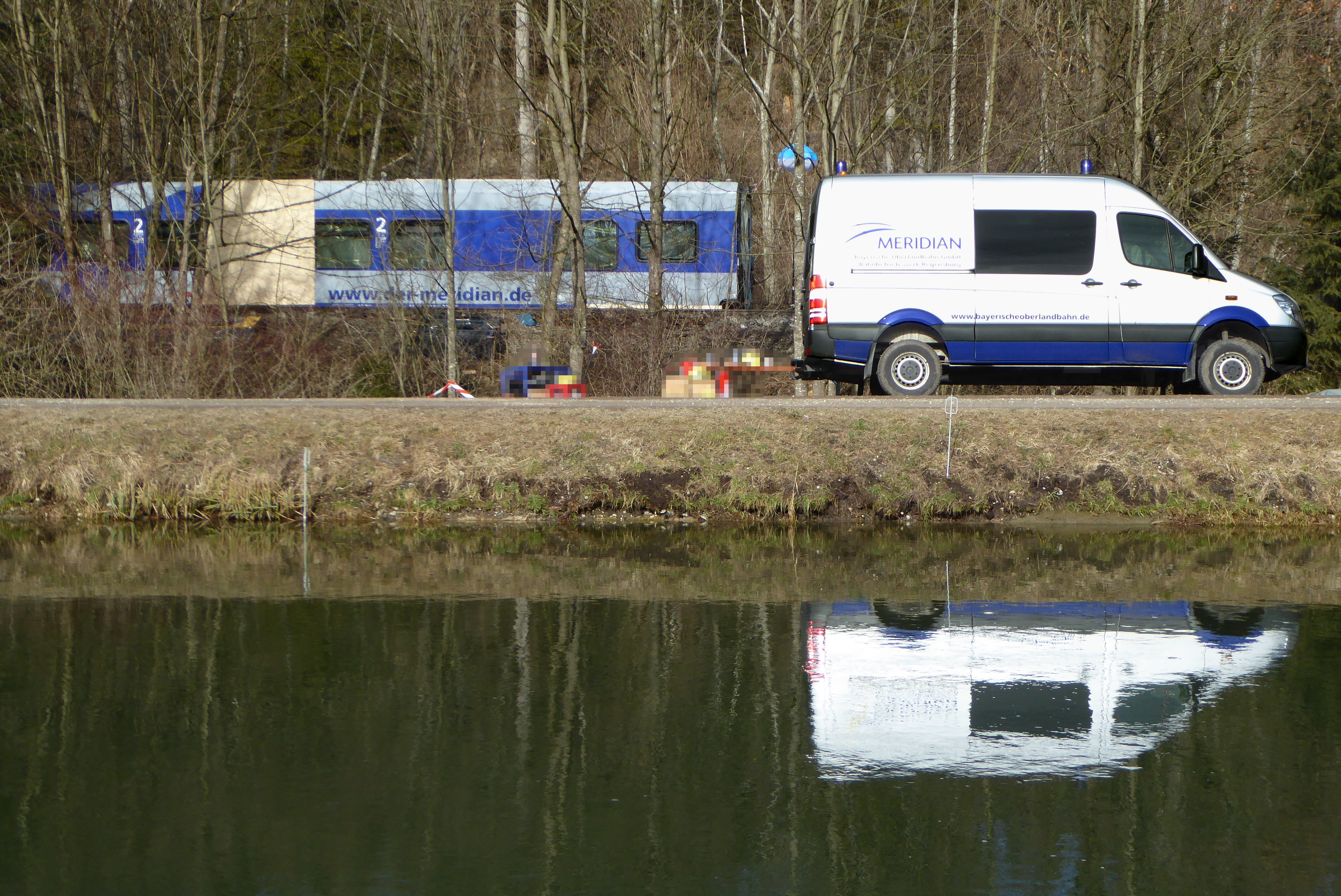
One of the less-damaged carriages

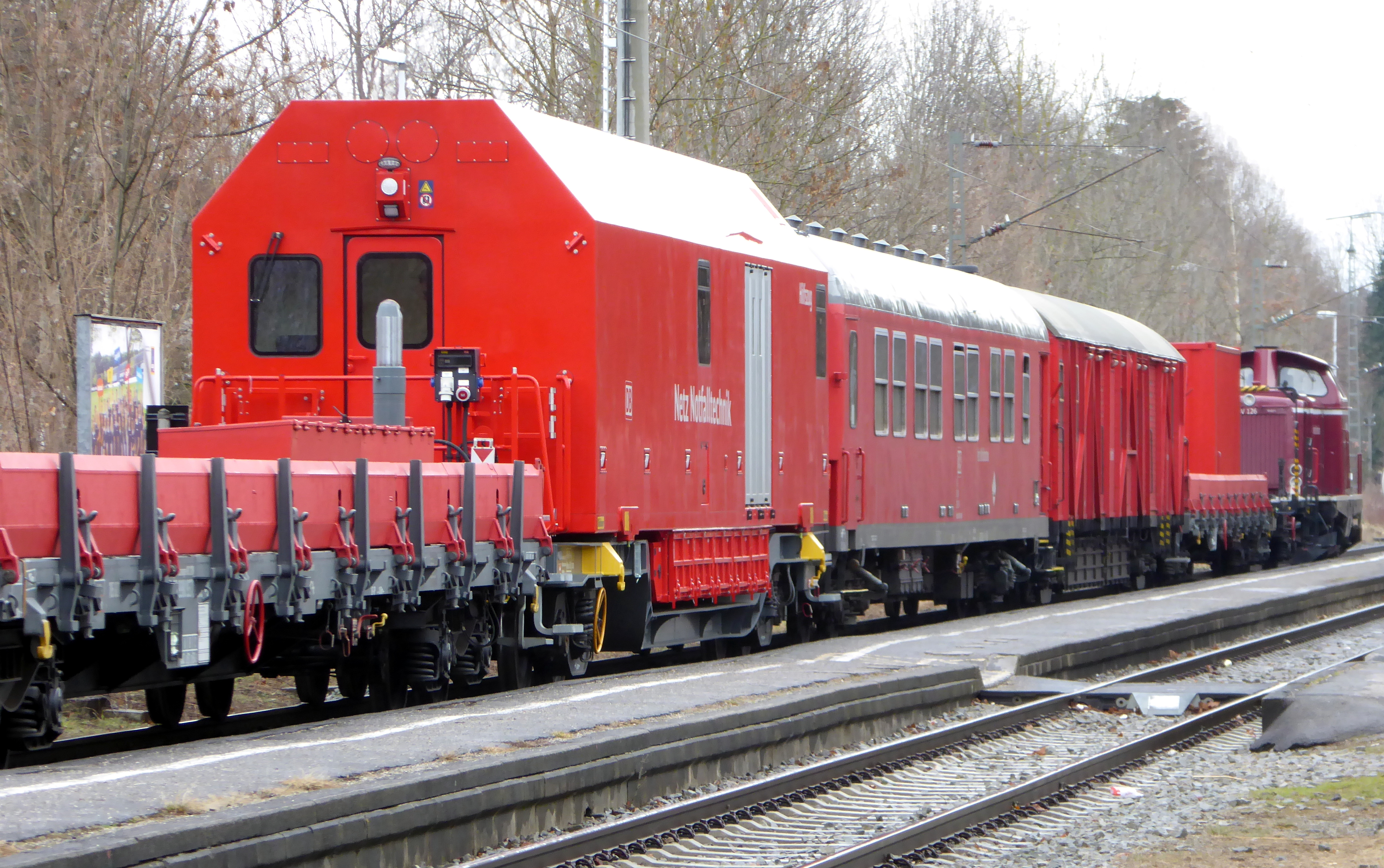
Emergency engineering train ready for operation in Kolbermoor

The rescue operation involved a total of approximately 700 emergency service workers, including 180 firefighters, 215 Bavarian State Police officers, 50 Federal Police officers, 30 federal civil protection employees of Technisches Hilfswerk, and 200 rescuers from the Bavarian Red Cross, including water rescue and mountain rescue units. A total of 11 helicopters took part in the rescue efforts. Air ambulances from both Germany and Austria were used to transport the injured to hospitals.

The site of the crash was difficult to reach because it lies between the Stuckholz forest and the canalised Mangfall river (Mangfallkanal). This made rescue work more difficult because rescue workers had to be transported by boat and casualty extraction supported by air ambulance. Injured people were extracted by boat to the opposite bank of the river.

=== Recovery operation ===
On 9 February 2016, two breakdown cranes belonging to the DB Netze Emergency Technical department (DB Netz Notfalltechnik) were dispatched from Fulda and Leipzig to assist in recovery and removal of the two damaged trains. The crane from Fulda was capable of lifting 160 tonnes, and the second crane from Leipzig was capable of lifting 75 tonnes.

=== Reaction ===
German Transport Minister Alexander Dobrindt visited the site of the crash. He said it was a "horrifying sight". Bavarian Interior Minister Joachim Herrmann said that it was "difficult to comprehend" how the accident happened. Chancellor Angela Merkel said she was "dismayed and saddened" by the crash. German Foreign Minister Frank-Walter Steinmeier stated: "My deepest sympathy goes to their families." Minister-President of Bavaria Horst Seehofer said "The whole of Bavaria has been shaken".

As a result of the crash, the carnival celebrations on Shrove Tuesday in Rosenheim, Bad Aibling and the surrounding area were cancelled. The traditional political debates on Ash Wednesday in Lower Bavaria were called off.

== Investigations ==
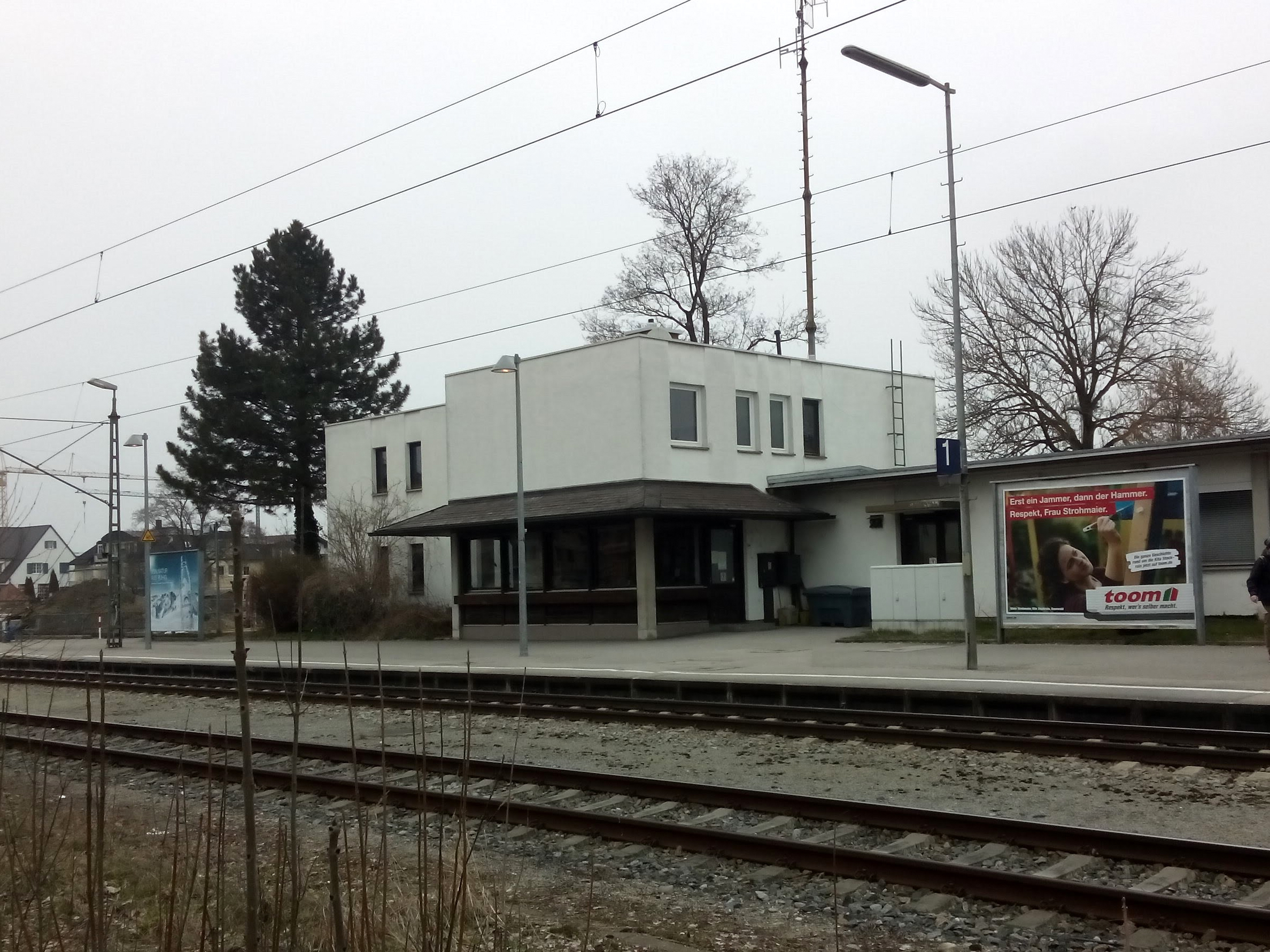
The dispatch office of Bad Aibling railway station, which also operates as a signalling centre for the railway stations in Kolbermoor, Heufeld and Bad Aibling-Kurpark

The German Rail Accident Investigation Agency (Eisenbahn-Unfalluntersuchungsstelle des Bundes, EUB) opened investigation number 04/2016 into the crash. The German police opened a separate investigation. Police confirmed that nine of the eleven deaths were local men from the districts of Rosenheim and Traunstein, aged 24–59. The cause of this crash was unclear. By the evening of 9 February 2016, Federal Transport Minister Alexander Dobrindt reported that two of the trains' three train event recorders had been recovered. The third was still located in one of the wedged train carriages. On 12 February it was announced that the third event recorder had been recovered. Police said that the recorder was damaged, but attempts would be made to extract the data. Data from the other two recorders had thus far provided no indication of human error on the part of the train crew.

In a press conference on 16 February 2016, the local prosecutor (Staatsanwalt) identified "human error" by a train dispatcher at the signalling centre in Bad Aibling as the cause of the crash. German investigators said they found no evidence of mechanical failure or technical defects that would have caused the crash. The dispatcher, Michael P., was also charged with gefährlicher Eingriff in den Bahnverkehr (dangerous interference with railways), which is punishable with up to ten years' imprisonment.

Zs 1 subsidiary signal

Many German railway main signals are equipped with an additional subsidiary signal called "Zs 1" (shown as three white dots in a triangle shape). This subsidiary signal replaces a written order authorising a train driver to pass the signal while it is showing a stop aspect. The train dispatcher can activate it from the signal box. There are no safety controls in the signal box, other than special operating rules, for the dispatcher to activate a Zs 1 signal. When a Zs 1 subsidiary signal is shown to the train driver, they must press and hold the PZB button "Befehl" ("Order") in the cab while moving the train over an active 2000-Hz emergency stop inductor located at the main signal. A warning tone sounds in the cab to acknowledge to the driver that they are pressing the Written Order button. If in a station the Zs 1 signal is the last signal, after the complete train has passed the stop signal and any following points (at a speed not exceeding 40 km/h (25 mph)), the driver may continue with normal speed. The Zs 1 subsidiary signal is supposed to be used only in circumstances when a route for a train cannot be set. There are sections in the rulebook on how and when it may be activated safely, but according to the local prosecutor, these rules were not adhered to.

In April 2016 it was revealed that the dispatcher had been playing a game on his mobile phone at the time. After realising he had made an error, allowing both trains to proceed, he dialled an incorrect number when trying to issue an emergency call. No technical fault existed with either of the trains or the signalling system. With these new findings the prosecutors reversed their initial assumption of Augenblicksversagen (lapse of attention) turning it into a charge of Pflichtverletzung (breach of obligations), which carries a heavier penalty. As a result, an arrest warrant was issued, and the train dispatcher was held in pre-trial detention from 12 April 2016. The prosecutors brought the charges to the court in Traunstein in mid July 2016 with accusations on twelve accounts of fahrlässige Tötung (involuntary manslaughter) and 89 accounts of fahrlässige Körperverletzung (involuntary battery). The main trial was scheduled for seven days between 10 November and 5 December 2016. On the first day of trial, the defendant confessed to the charges brought by the prosecutors, but his lawyer wanted the degree of guilt to be evaluated during the subsequent proceedings. Although he showed a degree of compassion for the victims, the defendant refused to answer questions on the intensity of his preoccupation with the mobile game.

The expert witness from the EUB investigation board had shown in court that while the documentation for the interlocking section (Betriebsstellbuch) was outdated, slightly incorrect and did not contain directions for the emergency radio, the actual interlocking setup was logical and fully functional in a way that an experienced train dispatcher could handle correctly. The defendant had not followed general guidelines, including a block signal test (Blockabschnittsprüfung), nor did he radio to the train driver to proceed slowly under the unusual circumstances. The original error had occurred somewhat earlier: with one of the trains running late, he chose to move the train crossing from Kolbermoor to Bad Aibling by juggling some of the signals. With a delay of only four minutes, this action was not warranted.

The court ruled on 5 December that he was guilty on all of the charges, and he was sentenced to three and a half years in prison. The verdict was final, as his lawyers renounced any appeal a week later. In July 2018 he was released on probation after having served two-thirds of the prison sentence, in accordance with German law (§57 StGB).

A preliminary report was published by the German investigation agency on 7 March 2017. The report stated that the infrastructure was fully functional, but that some documentation was slightly outdated (for example, an unused GSM-R radio infill station was listed). The reconstructed timeline showed that an emergency call was first initiated 35 seconds before the crash, but to the wrong emergency call group. The emergency code for track workers had been selected twice (code 569, "Trackside maintenance groups: High-priority call", "Notruf-Strecke", labelled "Not Str MWM-MRO") instead of the general GSM-R emergency number (code 299, "Train groups: Emergency call", "Zugfunknotruf", labelled "ZF-Not MWM-MRO"). The final investigation report was published on 29 October 2018.

=== Timeline ===
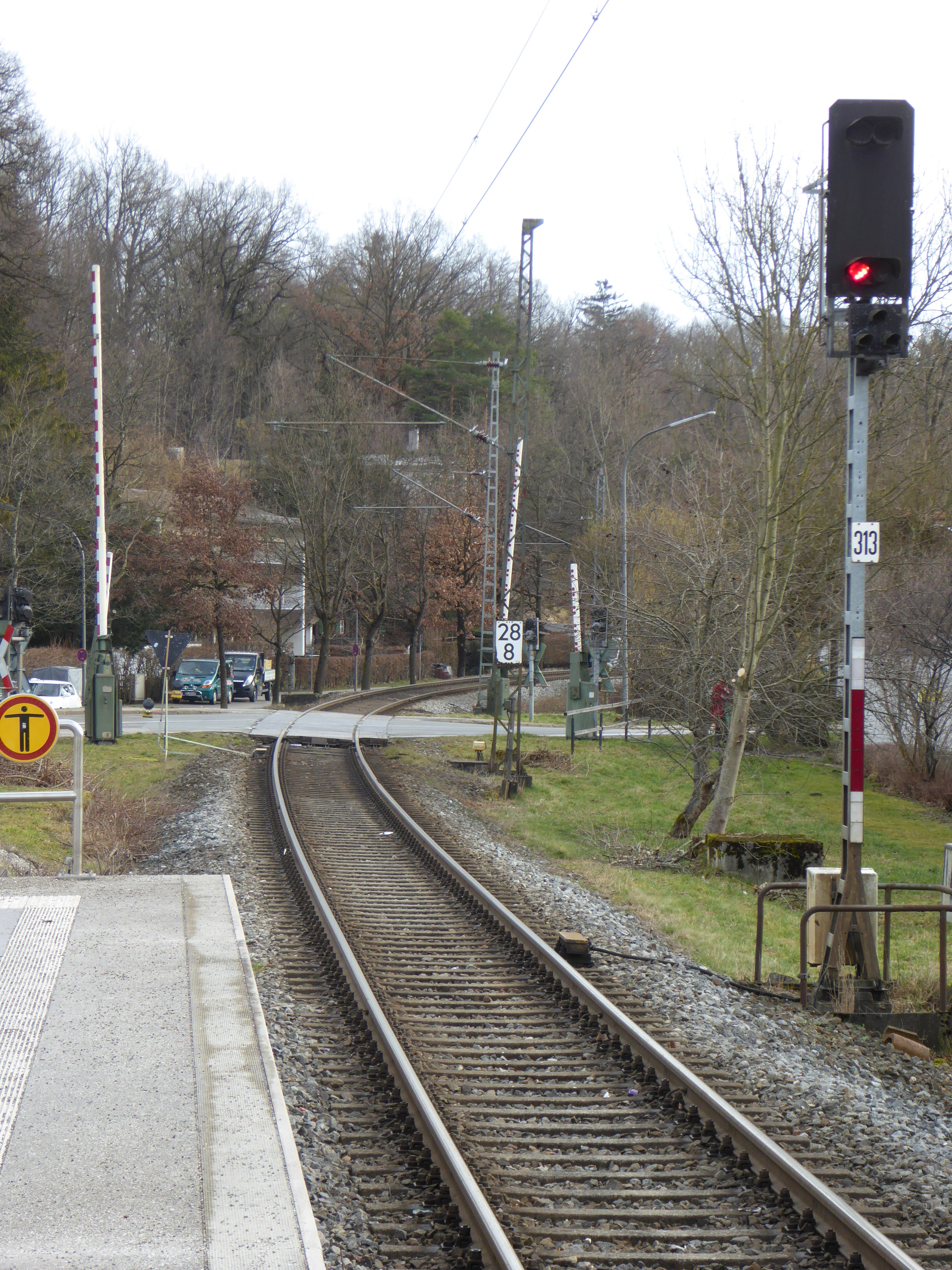
The exit signal at Bad Aibling Kurpark. On the day of the accident three white dots below the red lamp allowed the train to pass.

The reconstructed timeline shows that the westbound train 79506 entered the section to Kolbermoor at 06:37. The first action in the following series of events occurred at 06:38 when the train dispatcher set the signals for the train allowing both entry to Kolbermoor station as well as allowing exit towards Bad Aibling. The westbound train reached the station at 06:40. The train was supposed to wait until 06:45 at the platform for the eastbound train to arrive.

The eastbound train 79505 arrived at Bad Aibling station at 06:42. Since the exit signal at Kolbermoor was set to passing, the signal box did block the single track section to Bad Aibling for this train. Nevertheless, the train dispatcher tried to set the exit signal for the eastbound train from Bad Aibling towards Kolbermoor. He resolved the situation by assuming a technical error using the replacement signal "order" at 06:43 for the exit signal at the station and another replacement signal at the following station Bad Aibling Kurpark at 06:45. Now both trains were clear to enter the single-track section in opposite directions.

The eastbound train left Bad Aibling station at 06:43:38. The time was taken from the train recorder as the train passed over an active PZB inductor at the signal at danger. The westbound train 79506 at Kolbermoor waited for the regular departure time, leaving the station at 06:45:02. The train recorder of the eastbound train 79505 showed a stop at 06:45:14 in Bad Aibling Kurpark, quickly continuing on the single-track section. The signal at danger at Bad Aibling Kurpark was recorded at 06:45:46 (see picture).

Shortly later, the train dispatcher recognized the situation with both trains showing up on the same track whereas the train drivers could not see each other due to a curve near the Bad Aibling sewage works. At 06:46:20 an emergency signal was radioed by the train dispatcher and received by other workers but not the train drivers. Both train recorders show an emergency brake at 06:46:55, only a second before the crash. Before the emergency braking, the trains were travelling at 56 km/h and 92 km/h respectively. The last entries on the train recorders at 06:46:56 show remaining speeds of 52 km/h and 87 km/h. The energy supply for the overhead catenary was automatically shut down at 06:47:02.

== Recommendations ==
The investigation report issued in 2017 recommended that the menu options on GSM-R terminals should be altered, so that after pressing the emergency button, only a single menu option would be available. This single menu item would combine the track maintenance emergency (code 569) and train emergency (code 299) functions. The existence of two emergency functions comes from the general GSM-R standard to define only an emergency code for trains. In order to allow track workers to continue to warn a train dispatcher (about an obstacle they have found) Deutsche Bahn did not try to alter the EU-wide harmonized standard but they asked for a second channel at the national regulator (Eisenbahnbundesamt), which was approved. That way, the previous non-digital handheld phones could be replaced by new ones step by step. As a result, track workers and train drivers have one emergency channel and train dispatchers have two.

The final investigation report issued in 2018 added a few more recommendations. The investigators had asked the Technical University of Braunschweig to assess the psychological environment. The scientific report was attached to the final report. The researchers noted that the official rule book did not contain a dedicated section on how to perform an initial analysis in the case of operational interruptions, instead spreading the required steps over different sections relating to railway functions. Training for train dispatchers was also recommended to include tips for mitigating problems that can arise during times of mental underload.

== See also ==
- 2008 Chatsworth train collision, U.S. crash in which the driver missed signals while he was texting
- Kirkby train crash, 2021 accident in the United Kingdom in which the train driver was prosecuted for using his mobile phone whilst driving.
- List of German rail accidents
- List of rail accidents (2010–2019)
