= Ernolsheim-lès-Saverne =

Ernolsheim-lès-Saverne Arelse
- Commune
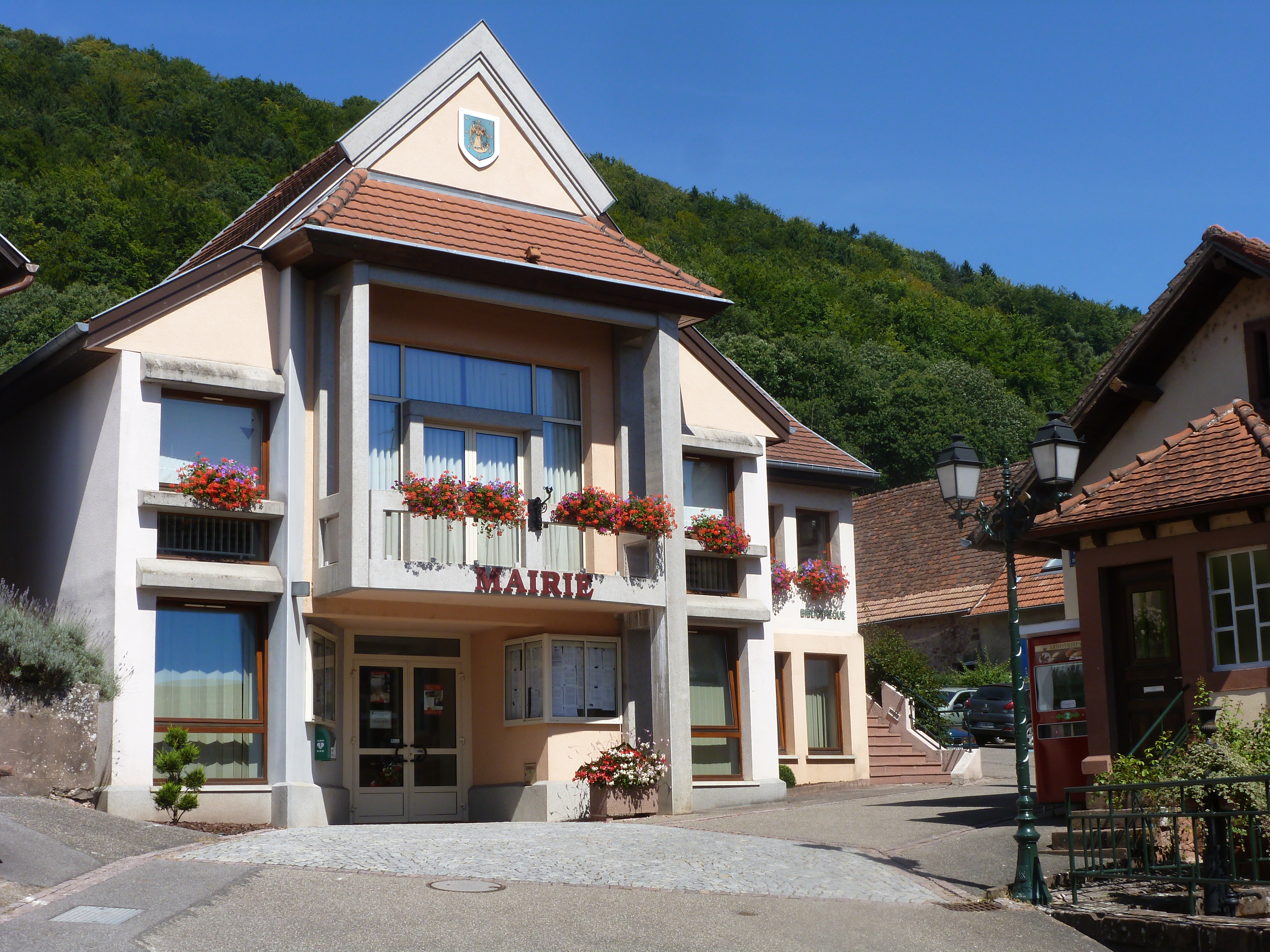
- The town hall in Ernolsheim-lès-Saverne

- Coat of arms
- Location of Ernolsheim-lès-Saverne
- Location within France Location within Grand Est
- Coordinates: 48°47′35″N 7°22′55″E
- Country: France
- Region: Grand Est
- Department: Bas-Rhin
- Arrondissement: Saverne
- Canton: Saverne
- Intercommunality: CC Pays de Saverne

Government
  - Mayor (2020–2026): Alfred Ingweiler
- Area^{1}: 10.94 km^{2} (4.22 sq mi)
- Highest elevation: 422 m (1,385 ft)
- Lowest elevation: 173 m (568 ft)
- Population (2023): 601
  - Density: 54.9/km^{2} (142/sq mi)
- Time zone: UTC+01:00 (CET)
  - Summer (DST): UTC+02:00 (CEST)
- INSEE/Postal code: 67129 /67330
- ^{1} French Land Register data, which excludes lakes, ponds, glaciers > 1 km^{2} (0.386 sq mi or 247 acres) and river estuaries.

Ernolsheim-lès-Saverne (German: Ernolsheim) is a commune, in the Bas-Rhin department in Grand Est in north-eastern France.

== See also ==
- Château du Warthenberg
- Communes of the Bas-Rhin department
