= Yaoundé train explosion =

1998 accident in Cameroon

Coordinates: 3°49′59″N 11°30′53″E

The Yaoundé train explosion was the catastrophic fire following the derailment and collision of two tanker trains hauling crude oil through the capital of Cameroon, Yaoundé. At least 200 people were killed in the explosion, which happened on February 14, 1998.

== Details ==
The train was a regular industrial transportation service running from Cameroon's oil fields along the Nigerian border to the capital Yaoundé, where it would either be processed at the Mvolye plant, or shipped directly to the coast for exportation. As it entered Yaoundé's suburbs in the mid-morning, it collided with another freight train heading south, and derailed. The tanker carriages were ruptured, and oil began to spill.

A large number of local people and passing taxi drivers stopped to collect the oil in containers, which they could then sell on for a bit of extra money, when the disaster occurred. Apparently, one of the persons collecting fuel was smoking, and dropped a cigarette, creating a flash fire, which travelled right back to the wrecked tankers, creating a massive fireball, which engulfed bystanders and persons collecting fuel. As it is not possible for a cigarette to ignite any of the most common fuels associated with crude oil refining, the cause of the initial fire is undetermined.

The emergency services arrived on the scene soon after the blaze started, but were for a long time held back by the force of the flames, which they were only able to contain, not extinguish. The fire did not stop burning for at least a day, and there were fears it might spread to the nearby central petroleum depot at Nsiam, although this was avoided. For days, a column of black smoke hung over the area of the blast.

Authorities were unable to give an exact number of casualties, but the final number of confirmed dead was over 200 people. At least 150 people were at some time after the explosion hospitalized after suffering burns. Railway services to the south of the country were cut off dealing another blow to Cameroon's oil industry, following a series of border skirmishes with Nigerian troops over control of the area two years previously.

Former colonial rulers France sent numerous types of aid to Cameroon following the disaster, including several prestigious medical burns specialists, as well as financial and technical help. The cause of the crash is not known, but may have had something to do with poor equipment and maintenance on the rail system due to Cameroon's endemic corruption. Cameroon was labelled "most corrupt nation 1998" by Transparency International.

== See also ==
- Lists of rail accidents
