= Mangfall Valley Railway =

Railway line in Bavaria, Germany

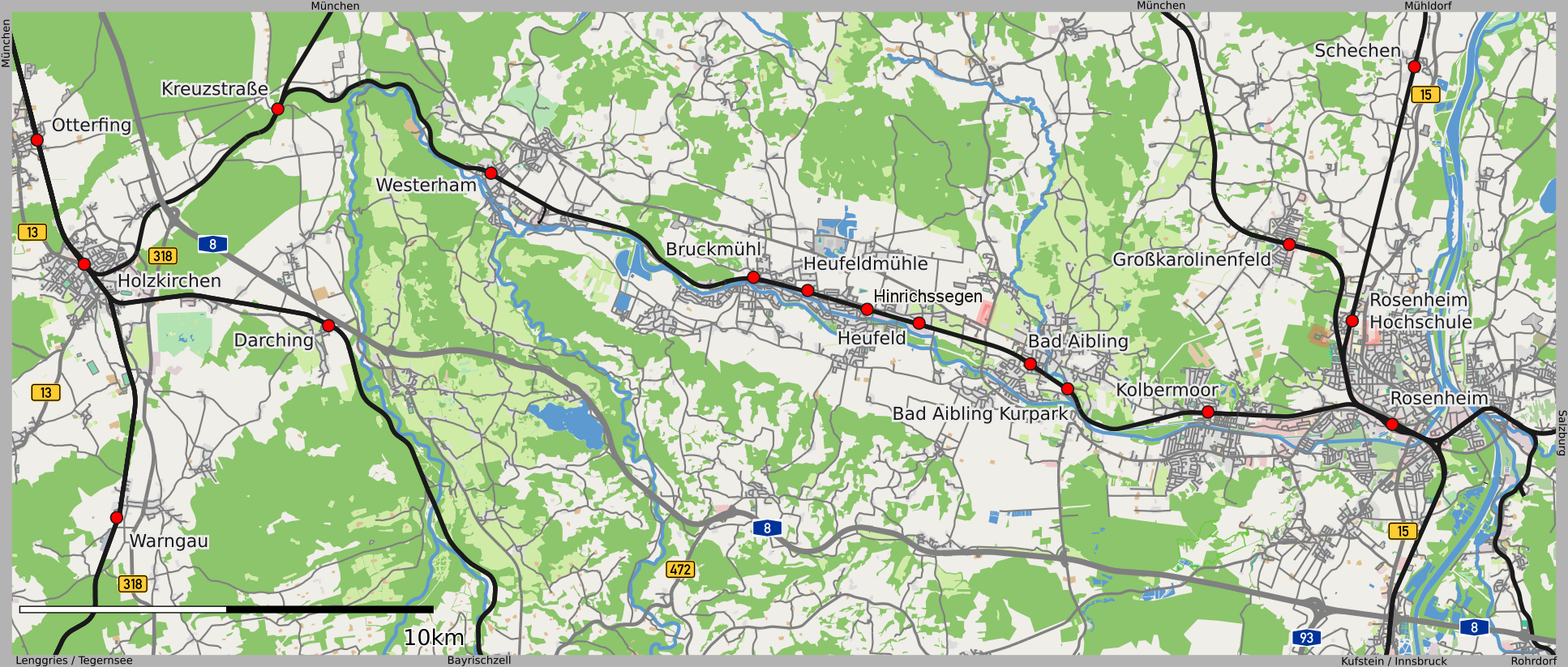

Overview
- Native name: Mangfalltalbahn
- Status: Operational
- Owner: Deutsche Bahn
- Line number: 5622
- Locale: Bavaria
- Termini: Holzkirchen; Rosenheim
- Stations: 10

Service
- Type: Heavy rail, Regional rail
- Route number: 958
- Operator(s): DB Netz

History
- Opened: 31 October 1857

Technical
- Line length: 37
- Number of tracks: Single-track railway
- Track gauge: 1,435 mm (4 ft 8 1/2 in) standard gauge
- Electrification: 15 kV/16,7 Hz AC Overhead line

The Mangfall Valley Railway (German: Mangfalltalbahn) (KBS 958) is a single-tracked, electrified railway that runs through the Mangfall valley in Bavaria, Germany, between Holzkirchen and Rosenheim. It is exclusively used by regional services. However it also acts as a diversionary line in case of difficulties on the Munich–Rosenheim railway.

== History ==
The Mangfall Valley Railway was part of the first rail link between Munich and Rosenheim (and beyond that to Salzburg/Kufstein), the so-called Maximiliansbahn. It was built by the state of Bavaria and completed on 31 October 1857. At that time the route ended in the Rosenheim suburb of Am Roßacker. Not until 13 November 1858 was the first "real" station opened in Rosenheim complete with locomotive shed and turntable. That locomotive shed still exists today and is used as an exhibition building (e.g. the Bajuwaren- and Der Inn exhibitions). The railway was mainly used at that time to transport coal from the mine at Hausham to the Salinensudhaus salt works in Rosenheim.

From Bad Aibling there was an electrified branch line to Bad Feilnbach, now dismantled. There was also a short stub line to Vagen, that was still used in the 1940s for passenger traffic. Later the tracks were only used to access the Leitzach factory, before it was knocked down in the early 1990s.

The planned double-tracked expansion of the route has not been realised to this day, because in 1871 the newly built direct route from Munich to Rosenheim via Grafing (today the KBS 950/KBS 951) took over the role of the main line. In 1971 the line was electrified in order to provide a relief line for the heavily trafficked KBS 950 route. The turnouts in the stations are unusually long in order to fulfil this function.

Several new stations, at Feldolling, Hinrichssegen, Bad Aibling and Rosenheim, were to have been built some years ago; planning for them began in 1995. But even in 2006 the Deutsche Bahn stated that it could not give a firm date for the actual in-service date of the new stations. Local politicians have made strong complaints against Deutsche Bahn. However, by the end of 2019 the stations Feldolling, Hinrichssegen, Bad Aibling Kurpark and Rosenheim Aicherpark had been opened. Bad Aibling Kurpark was taken into service in 2009, followed by Hinrichssegen in 2014. Feldolling and Rosenheim Aicherpark stations were taken into service in 2019, with only a few months separating their in-service dates.

== Accidents and incidents ==
On the route between Bad Aibling and Kolbermoor on May 28, 1945, a military train full of soldiers collided head on with an empty train. The accident, which occurred in a forest, took five lives and caused 21 injured, some seriously. Contributory cause was the interruption of telephone and communication lines between Bad Aibling and Kolbermoor at the end of World War II.

On 9 February 2016 the Bad Aibling rail accident occurred only 700m from the location of the 1945 accident when two passenger trains were involved in a head-on collision near Bad Aibling. Twelve people were killed and 85 were injured.

== Route ==
The departure point for the route is at Holzkirchen on the KBS 955/956/957 (Munich–Holzkirchen–Bayrischzell/Lenggries/Tegernsee), where line 3 (KBS 999.3) of the Munich S-Bahn also ends. Kreuzstraße station is also an S-Bahn terminus, in this case for route 7 (KBS 999.7).

At Rosenheim the line meets the KBS 950 and 951 main lines as well as the less important, unelectrified and single-tracked main line to Mühldorf (KBS 944).

The entire route was worked until recently by locomotive-hauled push-pull trains, but more recently by electric multiple-units of DBAG Class 425. A higher train frequency is planned, as is the introduction of more stations (see table).

== See also ==
- Weitere Information on the Mangfalltalbahn
- Plans for the new Mangfalltalbahn as at 2002
