= Eckartswiller =

Eckartswiller Eckertswiller
- Commune
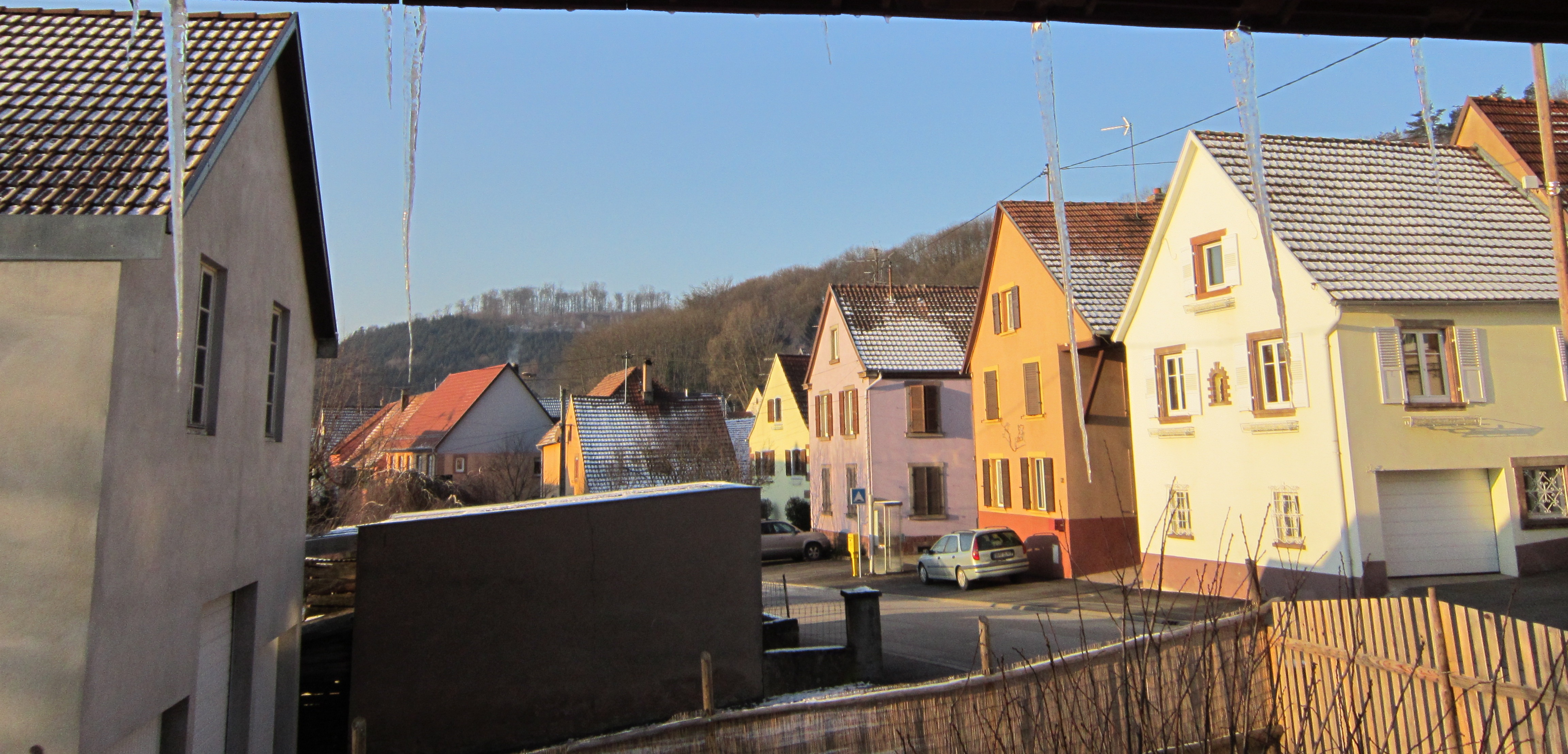
- Eckartswiller in winter

- Coat of arms
- Location of Eckartswiller
- Location within France Location within Grand Est
- Coordinates: 48°46′00″N 7°21′21″E
- Country: France
- Region: Grand Est
- Department: Bas-Rhin
- Arrondissement: Saverne
- Canton: Saverne
- Intercommunality: CC Pays de Saverne

Government
  - Mayor (2020–2026): Jean-Jacques Jundt
- Area^{1}: 12.43 km^{2} (4.80 sq mi)
- Highest elevation: 431 m (1,414 ft)
- Lowest elevation: 187 m (614 ft)
- Population (2023): 420
  - Density: 34/km^{2} (88/sq mi)
- Time zone: UTC+01:00 (CET)
  - Summer (DST): UTC+02:00 (CEST)
- INSEE/Postal code: 67117 /67700
- ^{1} French Land Register data, which excludes lakes, ponds, glaciers > 1 km^{2} (0.386 sq mi or 247 acres) and river estuaries.

Eckartswiller (French pronunciation: [ɛkaʁt͡svilɛʁ]; German: Eckartsweiler) is a commune, in the Bas-Rhin department in Grand Est in north-eastern France.

== See also ==
- Communes of the Bas-Rhin department
