= Saint-Jean-Saverne =

Saint-Jean-Saverne Sànt Johànn
- Commune
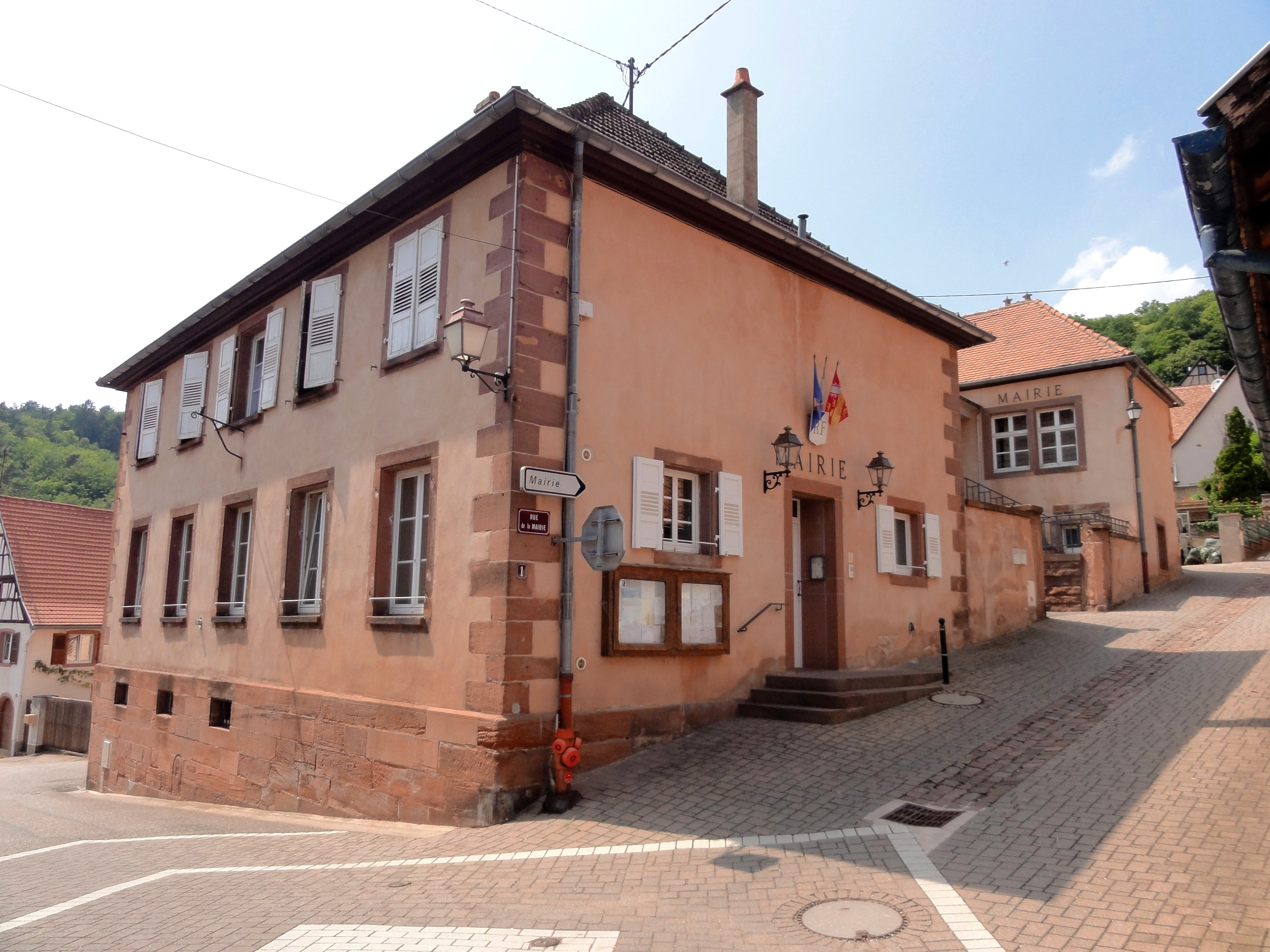
- The town hall in Saint-Jean-Saverne

- Coat of arms
- Location of Saint-Jean-Saverne
- Location within France Location within Grand Est
- Coordinates: 48°46′16″N 7°21′43″E
- Country: France
- Region: Grand Est
- Department: Bas-Rhin
- Arrondissement: Saverne
- Canton: Saverne
- Intercommunality: Pays de Saverne

Government
  - Mayor (2020–2026): Jean Goetz
- Area^{1}: 6.39 km^{2} (2.47 sq mi)
- Highest elevation: 436 m (1,430 ft)
- Lowest elevation: 186 m (610 ft)
- Population (2023): 542
  - Density: 84.8/km^{2} (220/sq mi)
- Time zone: UTC+01:00 (CET)
  - Summer (DST): UTC+02:00 (CEST)
- INSEE/Postal code: 67425 /67700
- ^{1} French Land Register data, which excludes lakes, ponds, glaciers > 1 km^{2} (0.386 sq mi or 247 acres) and river estuaries.

Saint-Jean-Saverne (French pronunciation: [sɛ̃ ʒɑ̃ savɛʁn]; German: Sankt Johann bei Zabern; Alsatian: Sànt Johànn) is a commune in the Bas-Rhin department in Grand Est in north-eastern France.

== Population ==
Historical population
Year	Pop.	±% p.a.
1968	550	—
1975	547	−0.08%
1982	563	+0.41%
1990	559	−0.09%
1999	598	+0.75%
2007	597	−0.02%
2012	592	−0.17%
2017	560	−1.11%
2023	542	−0.54%
Source: INSEE

== See also ==
- Communes of the Bas-Rhin department
