= 2008 in rail transport =

This article lists events related to rail transport that occurred in 2008.

== Events ==
=== By month ===
==== January events ====
- (Japan) January 16 – The Tozai Line in Kyoto is extended 2.4 km (1.5 mi) from Nijo to Uzumasa-Tenjingawa.

==== February events ====
- February 27
  - (Dominican Republic) – Official opening of Santo Domingo Metro.
  - (United Kingdom) – National Express changes the name of the railway operating company one to National Express East Anglia as part of a company-wide rebranding exercise.

==== March events ====
- March 9
  - (Taiwan) – The Red line in Kaohsiung opens for service.
  - (United States) – Sprinter starts service between Oceanside and Escondido, California, reinstating passenger service on the Escondido branch line.
- March 15 – The Osaka Higashi Line is scheduled to open in Osaka, Japan; the opening was originally scheduled for 2006, but delayed due to problems acquiring land.
- (United Kingdom) March 27 – Heathrow Terminal 5 station opens in London.
- (Japan) March 30 – Yokohama Municipal Subway's Green Line is opened for regular operations.
- (India) – Kolkata Metro is extended from Tollygunge station to Pranabnagar station.

==== April events ====
- April 1 – The Miki Railway Miki Line in Japan, which connected Yakujin Station in Kakogawa and Miki Station in Miki, is closed.
- (United States) April 26 – FrontRunner, a new commuter rail service, begins running in Utah.
- (United Kingdom) April 28 – Wrexham & Shropshire begin to run passenger services between London Marylebone station, the West Midlands, Shropshire and north-east Wales.

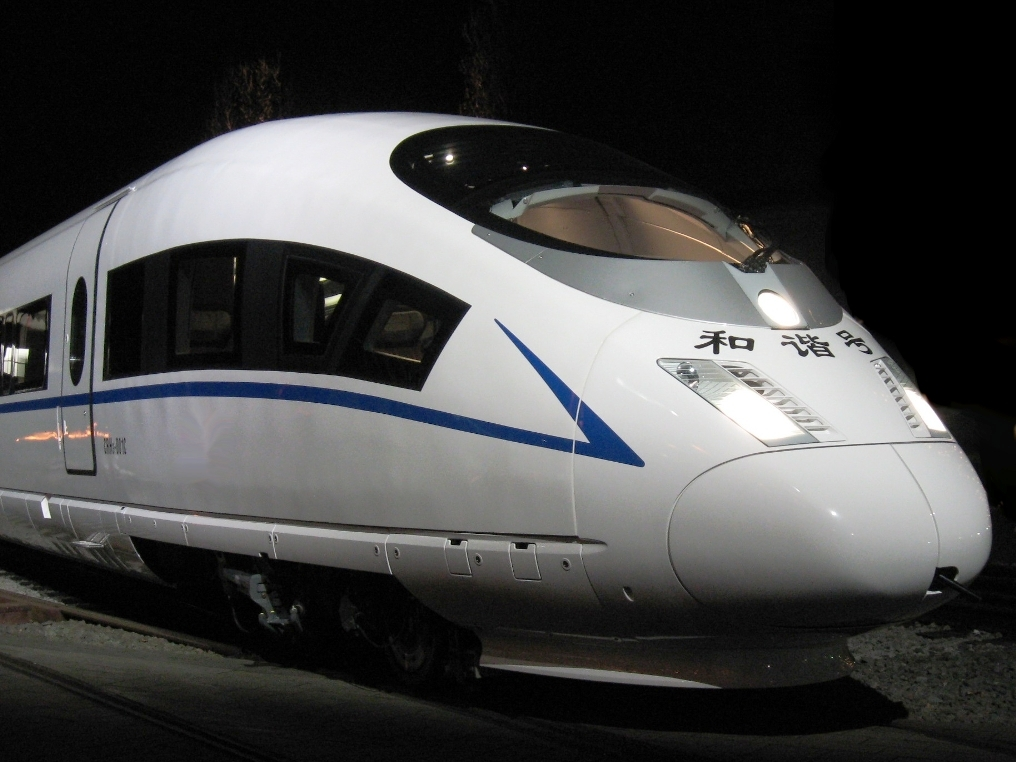
CRH3 unit for Beijing-Tianjin Intercity Railway

==== June events ====
- (United Kingdom) June 2 – An unexploded bomb from World War II is found near where the District and Hammersmith & City lines cross the Prescott Channel, not far from Bromley-by-Bow tube station, causing disruption to trains.
- June 2–6 – AfricaRail 2008 Conference.
- (Japan) June 14 – Opening of the Tokyo Metro Fukutoshin Subway Line between Shibuya and Ikebukuro (8.9 km (5.5 mi)).

==== July events ====
- July 5 – Meeting between Venezuela, Colombia and Ecuador regarding a proposed rail link for freight and passengers between the three countries, also connecting the Pacific with the Atlantic.

==== August events ====
- August 1
  - – China officially opens the Beijing–Tianjin intercity railway line, the first in the world regularly to host trains traveling up to 350 km/h (220 mph).
  - (United Kingdom) – LNER-design Peppercorn Class A1 60163 Tornado makes first official move under its own steam, the first main line steam locomotive built in Britain since 1960.

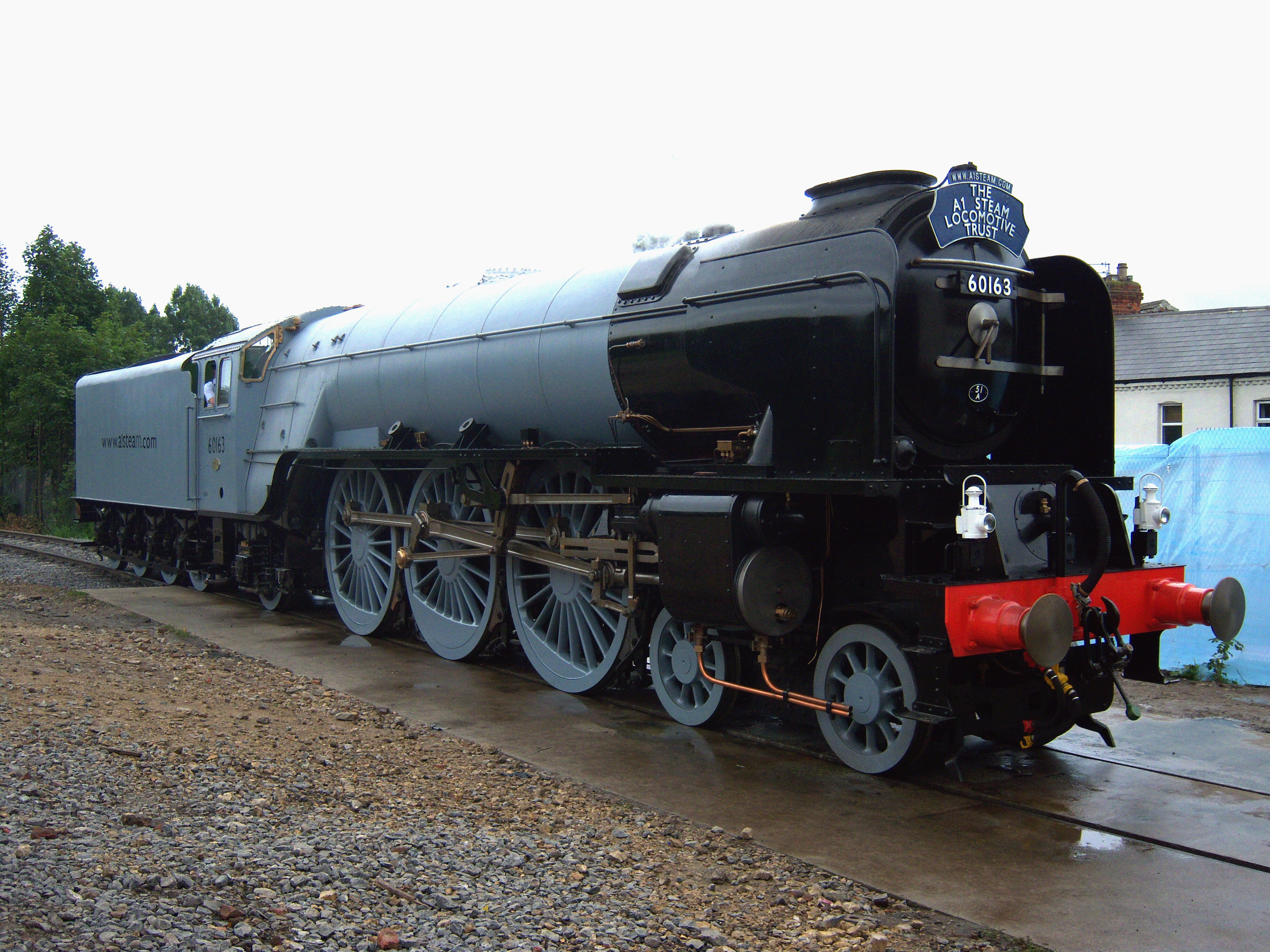
Tornado, August 2008

==== September events ====
- (Taiwan) September 14 – The Orange line in Kaohsiung opens for service.

==== October events ====
- (Azerbaijan) October 9 – The Green Line of the Baku Metro is extended from Memar Ajami to Nasimi.
- October 19 – The Nakanoshima Line operated by Keihan Railway opens for service between Nakanoshima and Temmabashi in Osaka, Japan.

==== November events ====
- (United States) November – Voter approval of Measure M in Los Angeles County, California, commits additional tax dollars to transit projects.

==== December events ====
- (Japan) December 14 – Final run of the original 0 series Shinkansen.
- December 27
  - (United States) – The first section of the new Valley Metro Rail system, part of Valley Metro in Phoenix, Arizona, opened.
  - (Japan) – The Monkey Park Monorail Line in Nagoya is abolished.

=== By season ===
==== Summer events ====
- (China) – The project to rebuild and upgrade Guiyang Southern Station to more than double its capacity is expected to be completed.

=== Unknown date events ===
- (India) – Indian Railways expects to complete the conversion of its electrified section in Mumbai from a 1,500 volt DC system to 25,000 volts AC; this will make the Mumbai section's electrification consistent with the rest of Indian Railways' network.
- – Vietnam expects to complete construction on the Hanoi–Lào Cai railway line upgrade.
- – The city of Saint Petersburg, Russia, will begin construction of a new intercity light railway beginning with a 26.5 km (16.5 mi) section between Baltiyskaya Zhemchuzhina and the Obukhovo metro station.

== Accidents ==
- April 28 – 2008 Shandong train collision: Sixty-six people are killed and almost 250 injured when a passenger train from Beijing careers off the rails and slams into another train in eastern China. The rail accident, the worst in China in more than a decade, happens near the city of Zibo in Shandong province.
- (Czech Republic) August 8 – 2008 Studénka train wreck: A EuroCity train en route to Prague strikes a part of a motorway bridge that has fallen onto the track near Studénka station and derails, killing 8 people and injuring 64 others.
- (United States) September 12 – 2008 Chatsworth train collision: A Metrolink commuter train, having passed a signal at danger, collides head-on into a Union Pacific freight train in Los Angeles, killing 25 and injuring 130.

== Deaths ==
=== March deaths ===
- March 16 – John Shedd Reed, president of Atchison, Topeka and Santa Fe Railway 1967-1986 (born 1917).

== Industry awards ==
=== Japan ===
Awards presented by the Japan Railfan Club

- 2008 Blue Ribbon Award: JR Central & JR West N700 Series Shinkansen
- 2008 Laurel Prize: JR East/Sendai Airport Transit E721 series/SAT721 EMU and JR East KiHa E200 DMU
