= Bessho =

Bessho may refer to:

== Places ==
- Bessho, a mountain in Norway
- Bessho Station (Shiga), Japanese railway station
- Ueda Electric Railway Bessho Line, Japanese railway line
- Himeji-Bessho Station, Japanese railway station
- Bessho Station (Hyōgo), Japanese railway station

== People ==
- Bessho (surname)
