= Ishino =

Ishino (Japanese: 石野) is a Japanese surname. Notable people with the surname include:

- Eriko Ishino (石野 枝里子, born 1985), Japanese speed skater
- Mako Ishino (born 1961), Japanese singer and actress
- Mami Ishino (born 1983), Japanese hurdler
- Mikako Ishino (石野 実加子, born 1988), Japanese handball player
- Ryuzou Ishino (born 1962), Japanese voice actor
- Takkyu Ishino (born 1967), Japanese composer and music producer
- Yōko Ishino (born 1968), Japanese actress
- Yoshizumi Ishino (born 1959), Japanese molecular biologist, known for his discovering the DNA sequence of CRISPR

== See also ==
- Marin Ishino, alias of Yoshinori Sunahara, Japanese DJ
- Ishino Station, railway station in Miki, Japan
- Shimo-Ishino Station, abandoned railway station in Miki, Japan
