= Brunel Awards =

Visual design in railways award

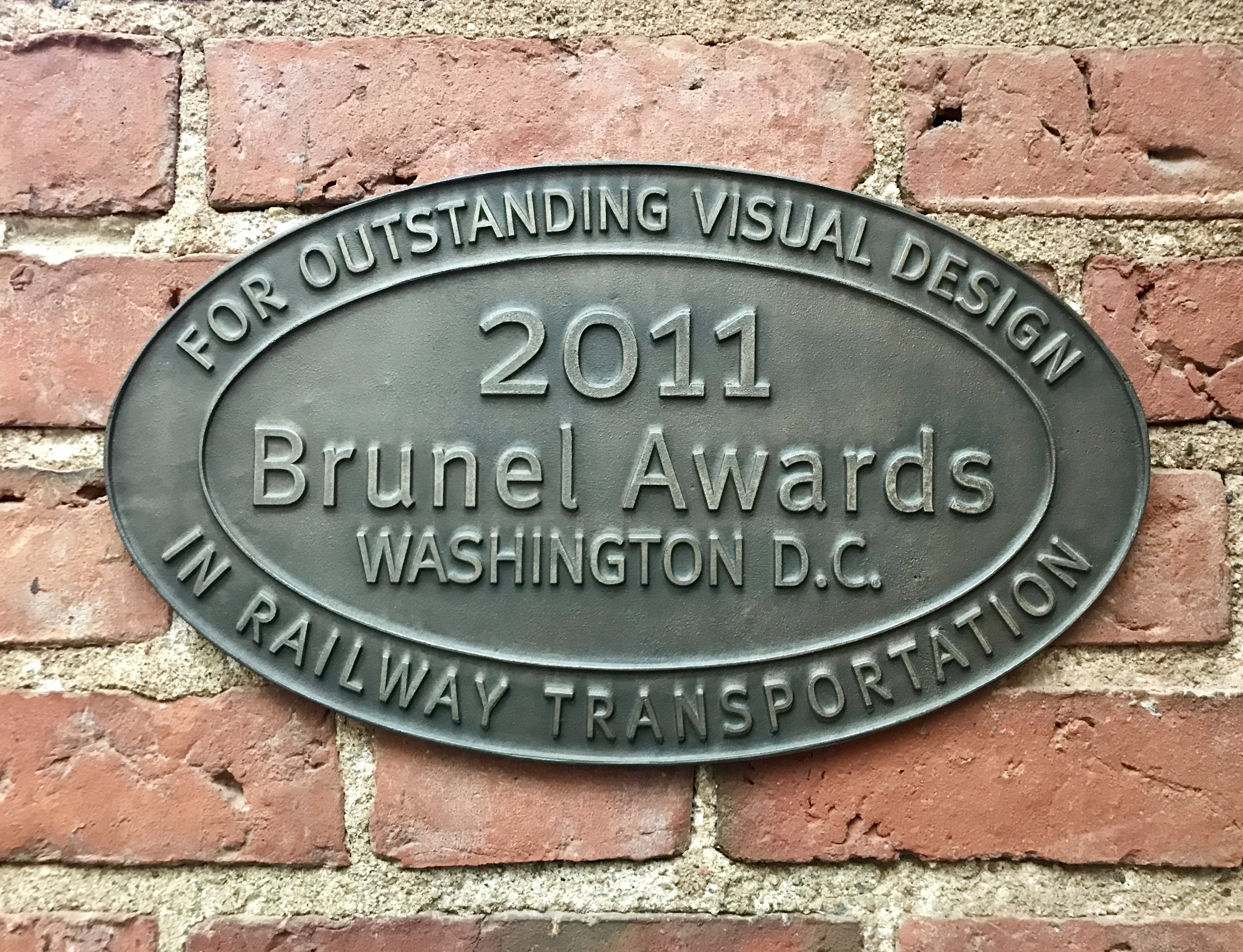
- Award plaque at Malmö Central Station
- Awarded for: Some of the best projects in railway architecture, graphics, industrial design and art, technical infrastructure and environmental integration, and rolling stock, as well as examples of overall design quality across the world's railways.
- Presented by: The Watford Group
- First award: 1985
- Website: Brunel Awards

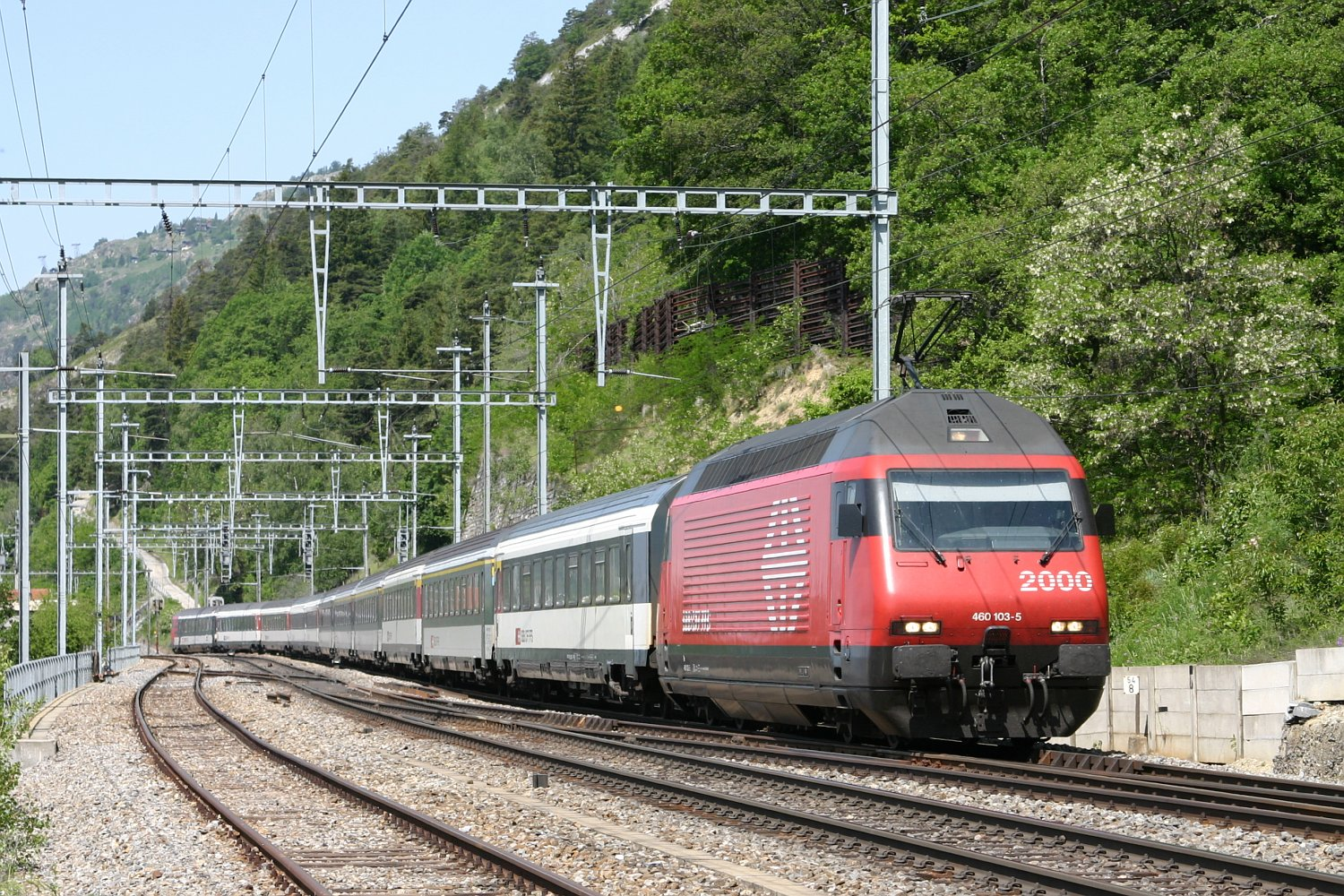
SBB-CFF-FFS class Re 460 locomotive: Brunel Award in 1992.

The Brunel Awards are given to railway companies, to encourage outstanding visual design in railway architecture, graphics, industrial design and art, technical infrastructure and environmental integration, and rolling stock. The name is assigned to them in honour of Isambard Kingdom Brunel, founder of the Great Western Railway, and designer of the giant ship SS Great Eastern.

== History ==
The Brunel Awards were first awarded in 1985, during the celebrations marking the 150th anniversary of the Great Western Railway.

Her Majesty Queen Elizabeth II of the United Kingdom presented the inaugural awards, at a ceremony in Bristol, England.

Awards	Year	Place	Organiser	Occasion
1st	1985	(United Kingdom) Bristol	British Rail (BR)	150th anniversary of the Great Western Railway.
2nd	1987	(Austria) Vienna	Österreichische Bundesbahnen (ÖBB)	150 years of rail transport in Austria.
3rd	1989	(Netherlands) Amsterdam	Nederlandse Spoorwegen (NS)	150 years of rail transport in the Netherlands.
4th	1992	(Spain) Madrid	RENFE	50th anniversary of RENFE, opening of the LGV Madrid-Seville, Expo 92 and Summer Olympic Games, 1992.
5th	1994	(United States) Washington DC	FoRTE	Foundation for Railway and Transportation Excellence.
6th	1996	(Denmark) Copenhagen	Danske Statsbaner (DSB)	
7th	1998	(Spain) Madrid	RENFE	150 years of rail transport in Spain.
8th	2001	(France) Paris	SNCF	Entry into service of the LGV Méditerranée.
9th	2005	(Denmark) Copenhagen	Danske Statsbaner (DSB)	
10th	2008	(Austria) Vienna	Österreichische Bundesbahnen (ÖBB)	
11th	2011	(United States) Washington DC	Center for Industrial Design in Transportation, Inc.	
12th	2014	(Netherlands) Amsterdam	Nederlandse Spoorwegen (NS), ProRail	125th anniversary of Amsterdam Central Station and 175 years of rail transport in the Netherlands.
13th	2025	(United Kingdom) London	Network Rail, International Union of Railways (UIC)	Railway 200: 200th anniversary of the Stockton and Darlington Railway and modern railways.

== Categories ==
Beginning with the 2011 awards ceremony, there have been five categories of award; the third category is new.

- Category 1: rail stations
- Category 2: technical infrastructure
- Category 3: freight and railroad support buildings
- Category 4: industrial design, corporate branding, graphics, furnishing
- Category 5: rolling stock

== See also ==
- List of architecture prizes
