= Abandoned railway station =

Railway station no longer in use

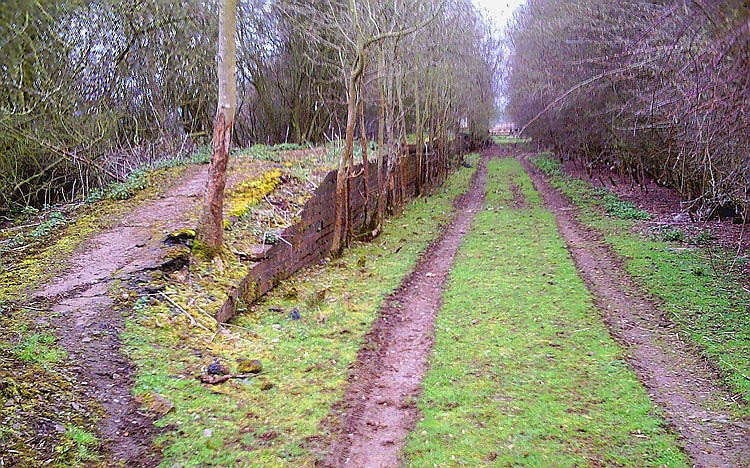
The overgrown remains of Lilbourne station in Northamptonshire, on the former LNWR line from Rugby to Market Harborough, UK, which closed in 1966, one of thousands of rural stations and lines to be closed by the Beeching Axe

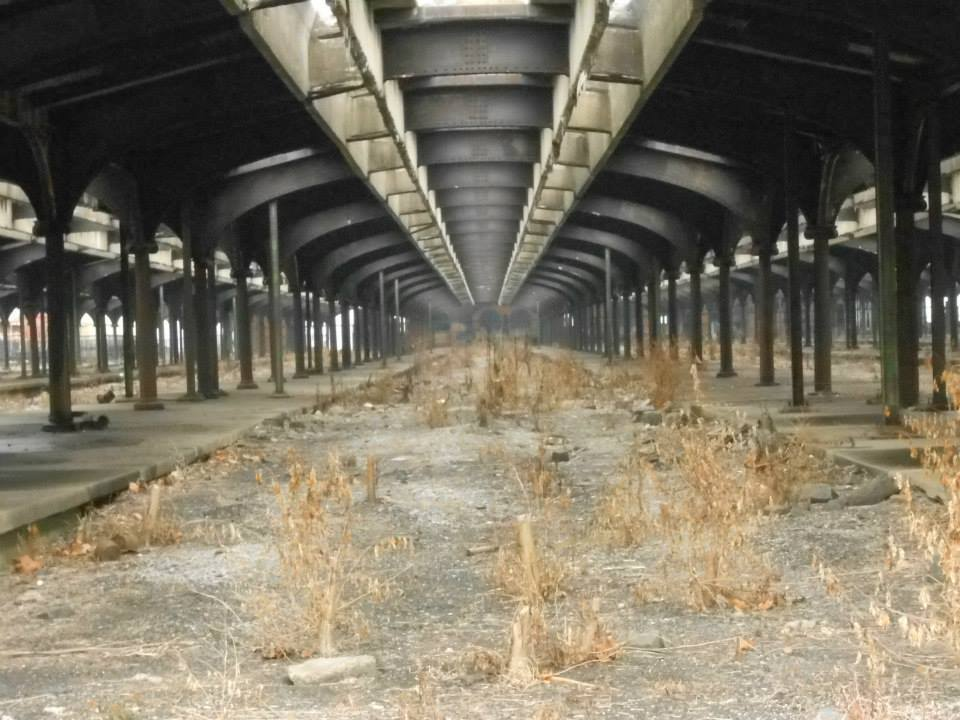
The former train shed at Communipaw Terminal in New Jersey, US

An abandoned (or disused) railway station is a building or structure that was constructed to serve as a railway station but has fallen into disuse. There are various circumstances when this may occur – a railway company may fall bankrupt, or the station may be closed due to the failure of economic activity such as insufficient passenger numbers, operational reasons such as the diversion or replacement of the line. In some instances, the railway line may continue in operation while the station is closed. Additionally, stations may sometimes be resited along the route of the line to new premises – examples of this include opening a replacement station nearer to the center of population or building a larger station on a less restricted site to cope with high passenger numbers.

== Reasons for abandonment ==
Notable cases where railway stations have fallen into disuse include the Beeching Axe, a 1960s program of mass closures of unprofitable railway lines by the British Government. The London Underground system is also noted for its list of closed stations. During the time of the Berlin Wall, several Berlin U-Bahn stations on West Berlin lines became "ghost stations" (Geisterbahnhöfe) because they were on lines that passed through East Berlin territory. According to Stefania Ragozino and Stefania Oppido, "The abandonment of the railways [sic] network, stations and tollbooth rails is a widespread phenomenon at national and international level, determined by social, economic and technological developments that have changed the local infrastructure systems."

== Dereliction and alternative uses ==
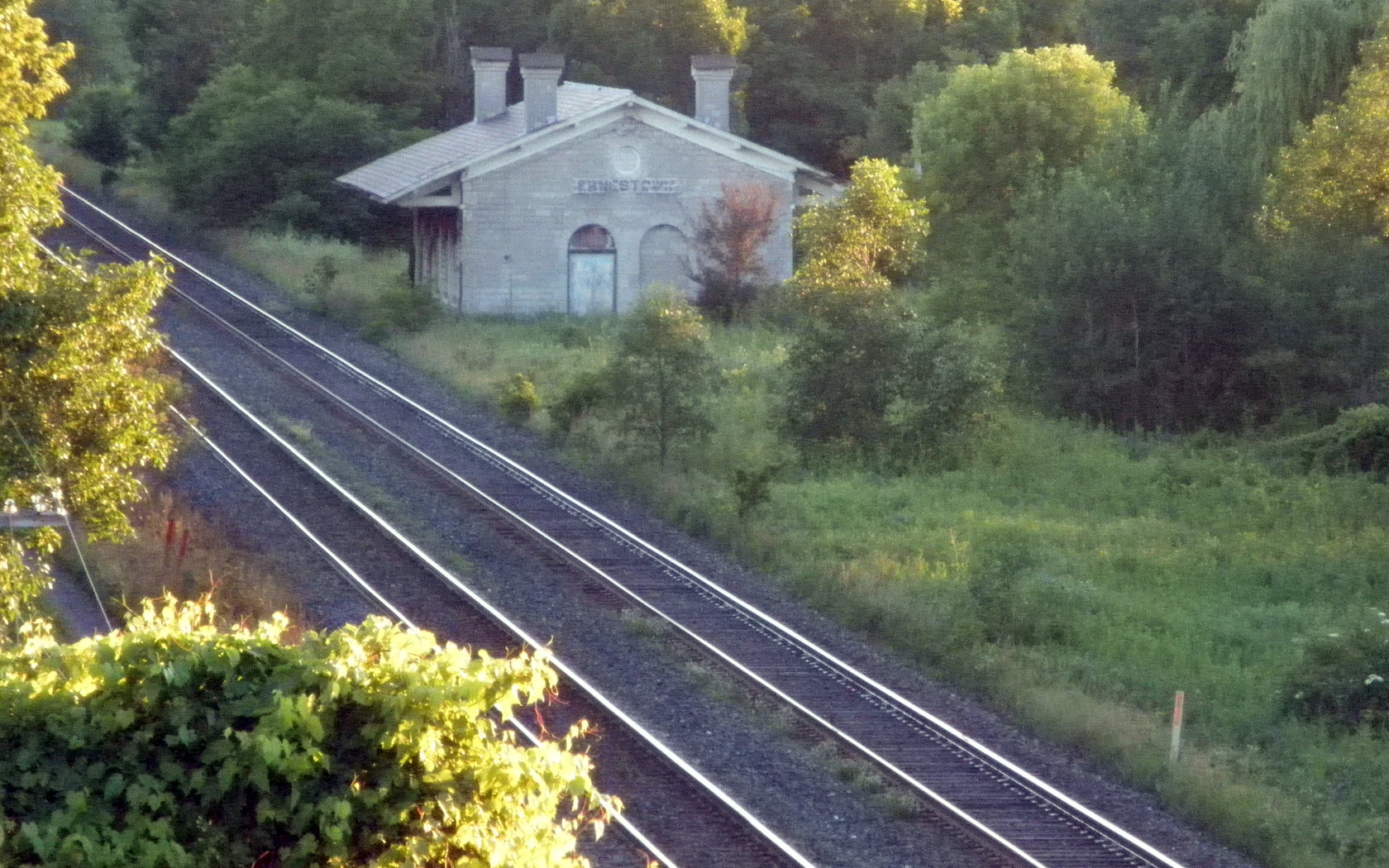
As the GTR never reached Bath, this station was built in an awkward rural location.

Railway stations and lines that fall into disuse may become overgrown.

Some former railway lines are repurposed as managed nature reserves, trails or other tourist attractions – for example, Hellfire Pass, the route of the former "Death Railway" in Thailand. Former railways have also been converted into long-distance cycleways, such as large sections of the National Cycle Network in the United Kingdom.

In rural areas, former railway station buildings are often converted into private residences. Examples include many of the stations on the closed Didcot, Newbury and Southampton Railway in England. Architecturally and historically notable station buildings may present a problem if they are protected under building preservation laws but fall into disuse. Such buildings are often simply demolished (such as Broad Street railway station in London), or they may be preserved as part of a heritage railway.

Abandoned railway stations can be repurposed to be retained as commercially viable structures within an urban environment, or as part of an urban regeneration project. Examples include the ornate Gare d'Orsay in Paris, which was converted into the Musée d'Orsay art gallery; the Manchester Central railway station, which was put to new use first as a car park and later refurbished as the Manchester Central Conference Centre; and Broad Street Station in Richmond, Virginia, which now houses the Science Museum of Virginia. The Ottawa Convention Centre is a former station, as are railway museums Memory Junction in Brighton and Railway Museum of Eastern Ontario in Smiths Falls. In Prescott the rail station houses historical society offices; in Lac-Mégantic and Kingston a former station houses a tourism information office. Stations have also been transformed into restaurants or private residences.

== Restoration ==
Some abandoned railway stations and lines have been brought back into operational service. In London the Docklands Light Railway made use of disused railway infrastructure for much of its construction; in Manchester it is proposed to expand the Metrolink light rail system by re-opening abandoned rail lines; and in Scotland, the Scottish Government has brought the Waverley Line partially back into passenger service.

== Gallery ==
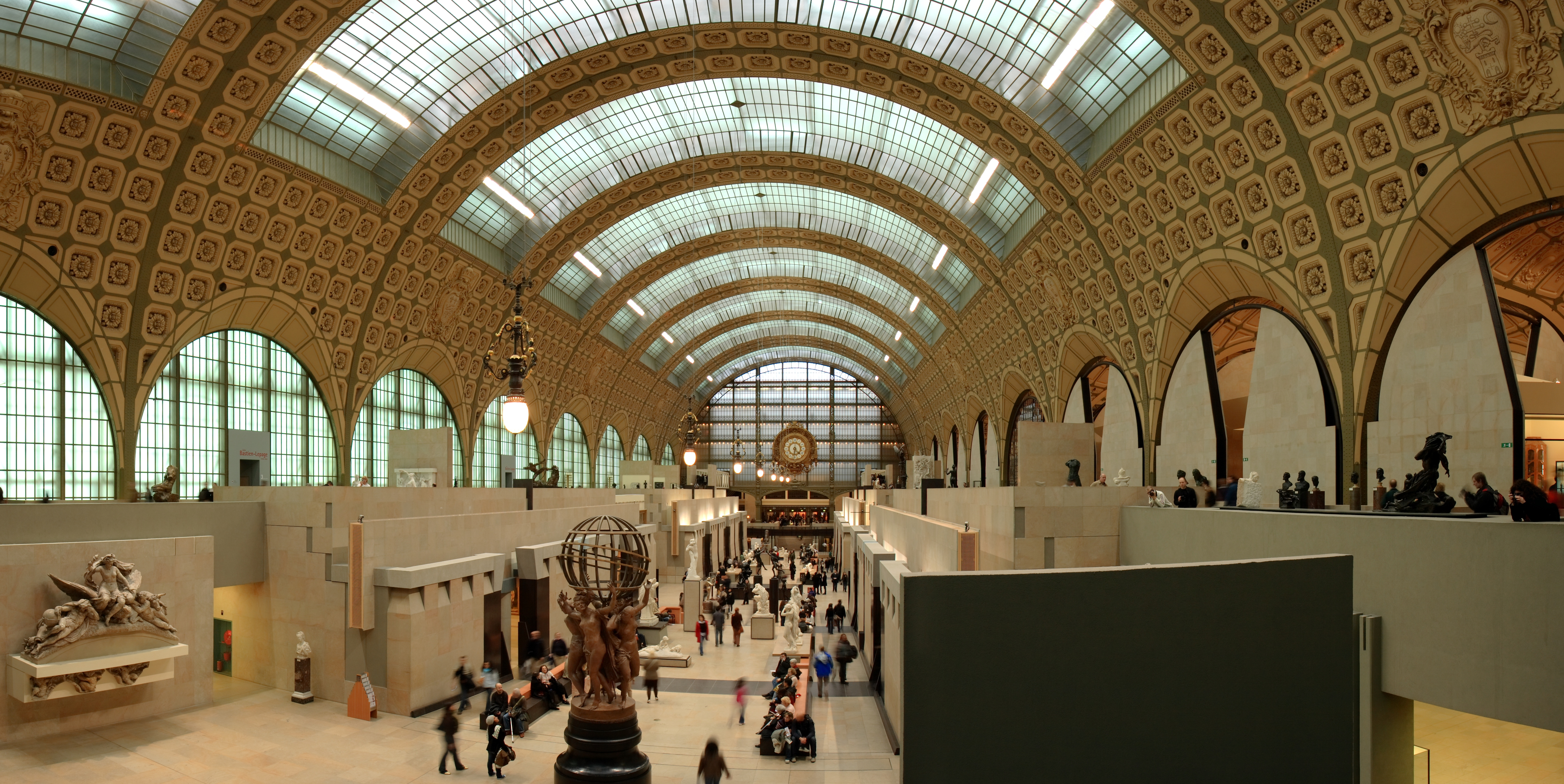
Musée d'Orsay, Paris, France

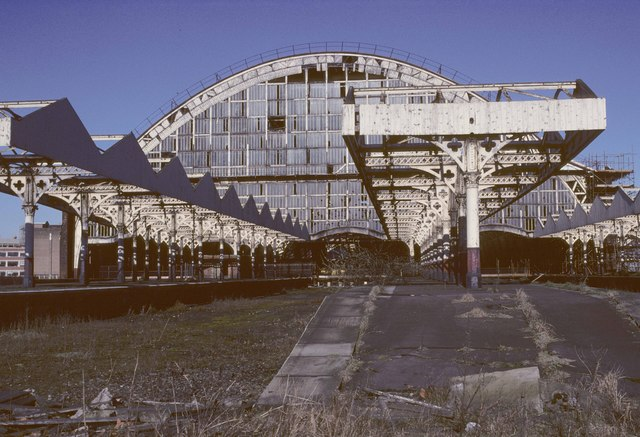
Manchester Central, Manchester, UK

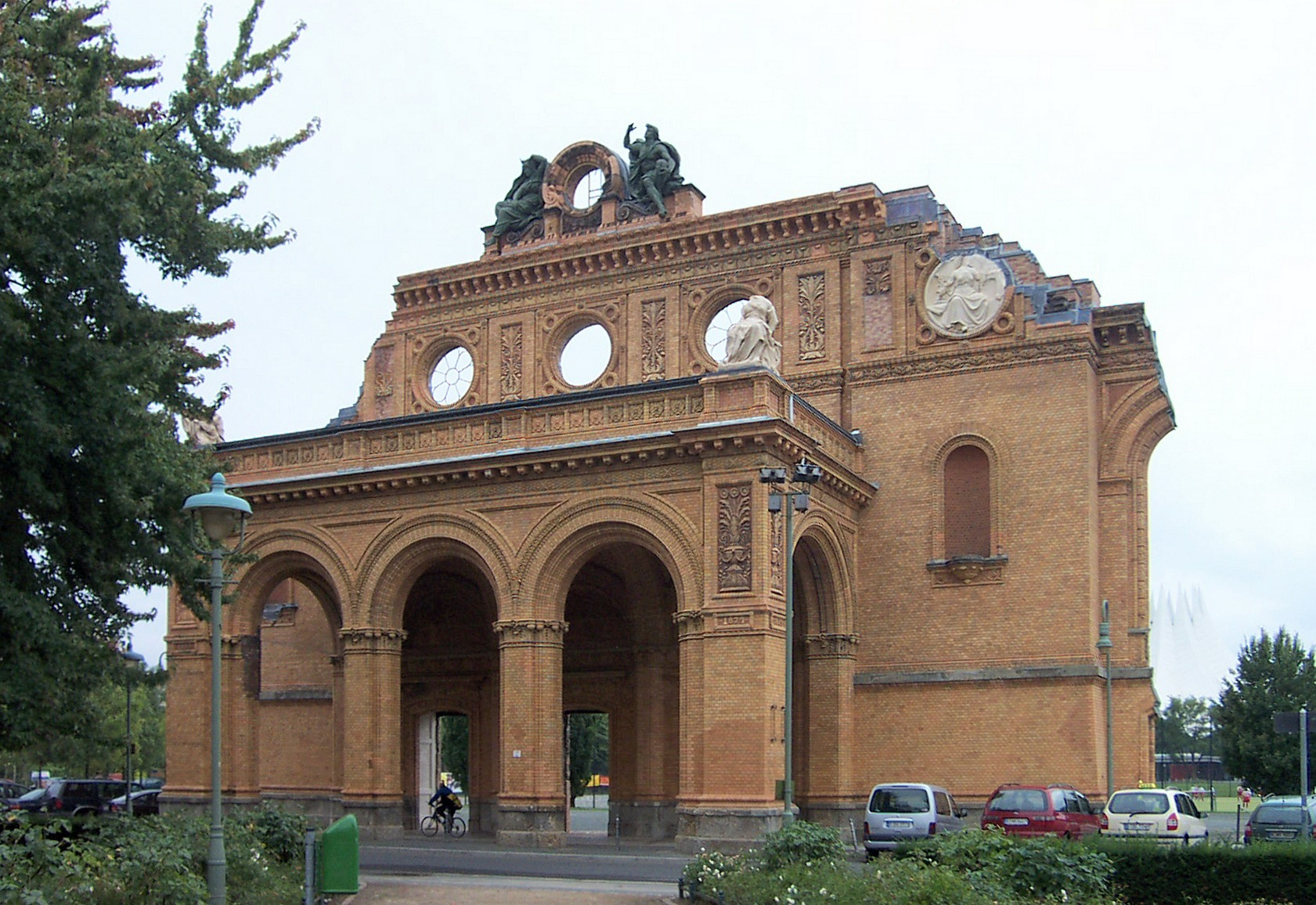
Anhalter Bahnhof, Berlin, Germany

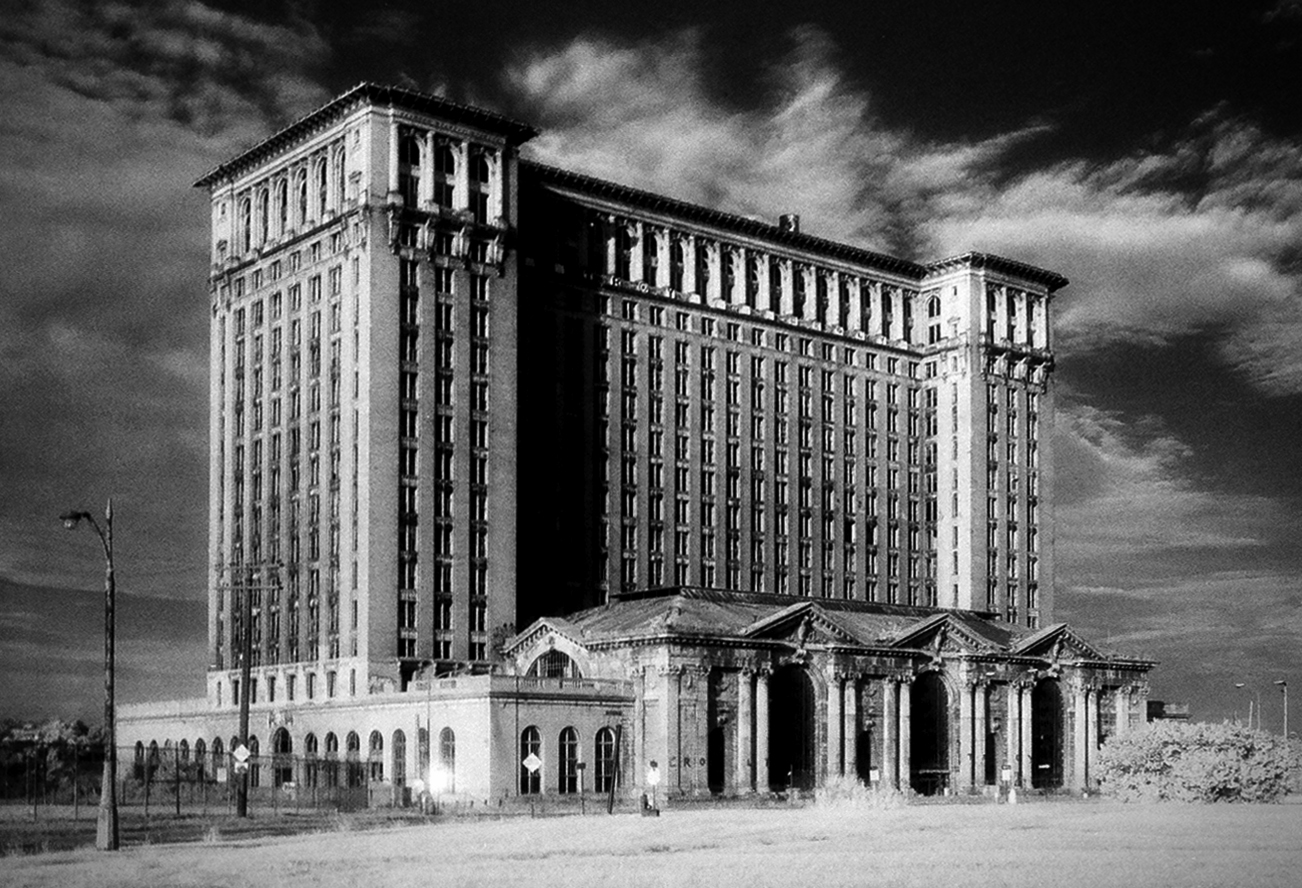
Michigan Central Station, Detroit, US

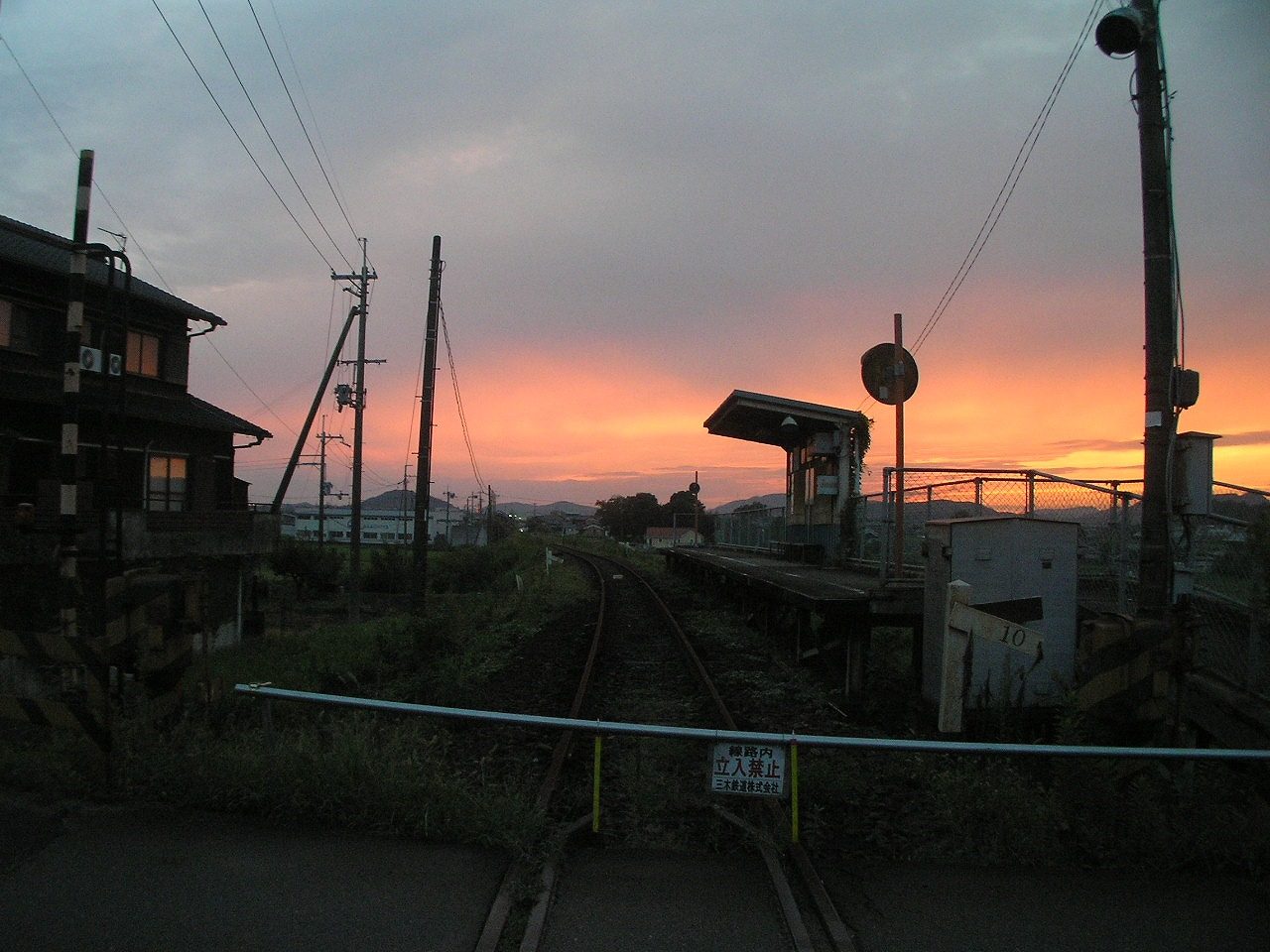
Sōsa Station, Kakogawa, Japan

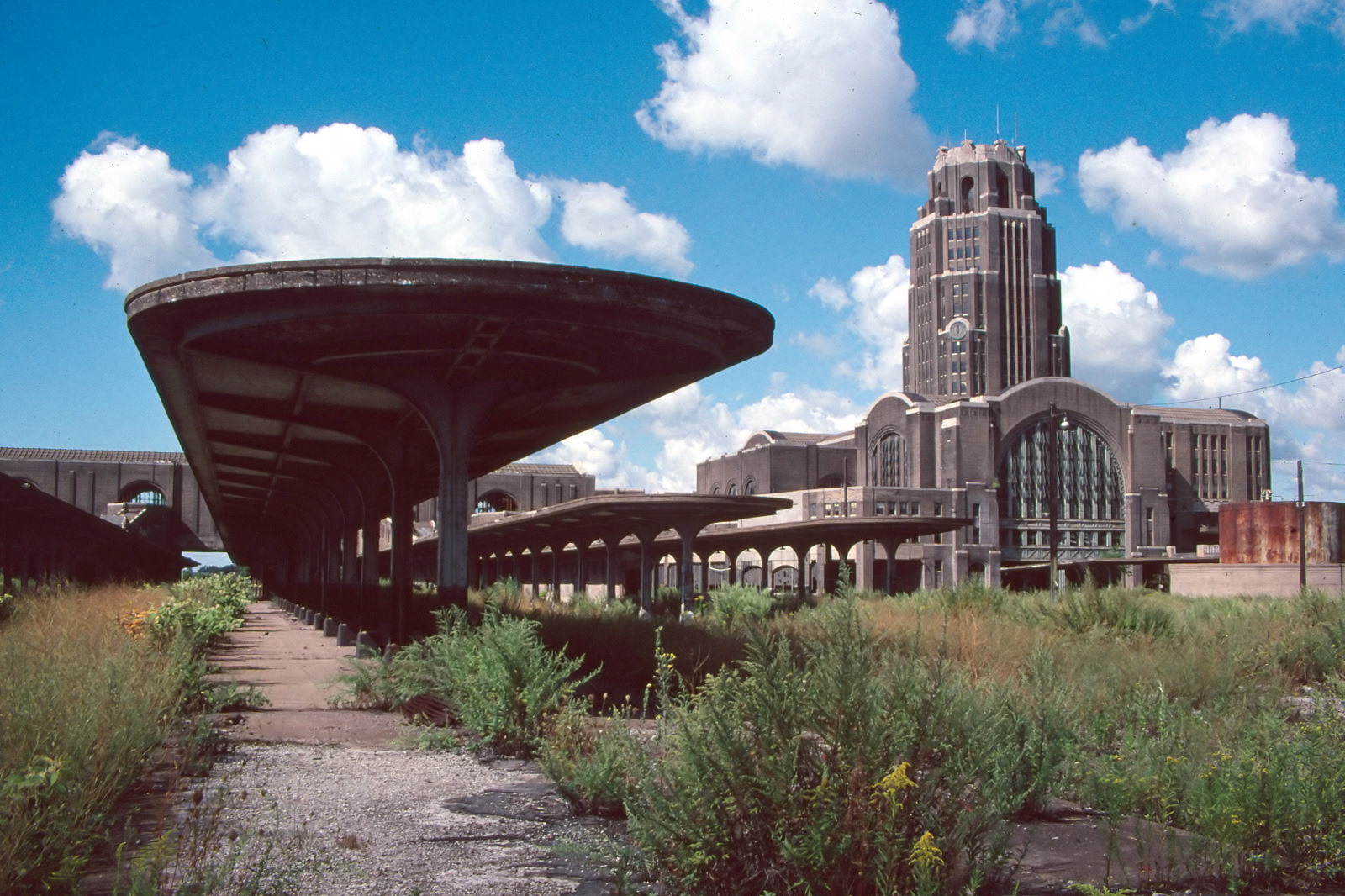
Buffalo Central Terminal, Buffalo, US

== See also ==
- Abandoned railway
- Ghost station
- List of closed railway stations in Britain
- List of former and unopened London Underground stations
- List of closed railway stations in Melbourne
- List of closed New York City Subway stations
- Disused railway tunnels in Sydney
