= Kunikane Station =

Railway station in Japan, abandoned 2008

Kunikane Station 国包駅
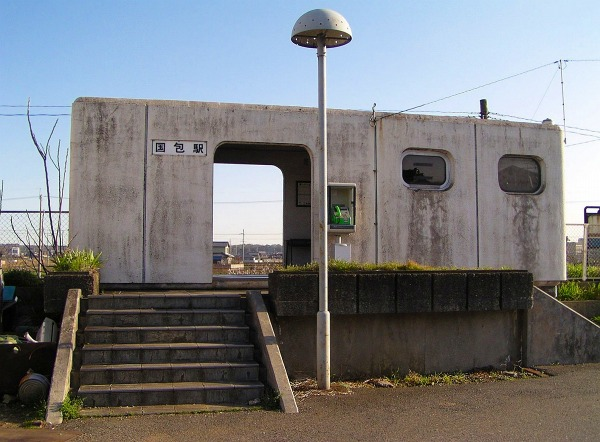
- Kunikane Station

General information
- Location: Kamishō-chō Kunikane, Kakogawa, Hyōgo （兵庫県加古川市上荘町国包） Japan
- Coordinates: 34°47′50.63″N 134°54′59.76″E
- Operator: Miki Railway
- Line: Miki Line

History
- Opened: 1916
- Closed: 2008
Location

Kunikane Station (国包駅, Kunikane-eki) was a railway station in Kakogawa, Hyōgo Prefecture, Japan.

== Lines ==
- Miki Railway

- Miki Line - Abandoned on April 1, 2008

== History ==
Although the Yakujin Station were named Kunikane Station between 1913-1916, the station was renamed when this station opened. Operations ceased on 1 April 2008 after the permanent closure of the Miki Railway. The ruins of the station was demolished in 2009, a year after the line was abandoned.

== Adjacent stations ==
«	Service	»
Miki Railway (Abandoned)
Miki Line
Yakujin	-	Sōsa
