= Yamamotoa =

Scientific classification
- Domain: Eukaryota
- Kingdom: Fungi
- Division: Ascomycota
- Class: Dothideomycetes
- Order: Asterinales
- Family: Asterinaceae
- Genus: Yamamotoa; Bat.

Type species
- Yamamotoa bomjardinensis Bat.

Genus of fungi

Yamamotoa is a genus of fungi in the Asterinaceae family. The relationship of this taxon to other taxa within the class is unknown (incertae sedis), and it has not yet been placed with certainty into any order.

The genus was circumscribed by Augusto Chaves Batista in Publ. Inst. Micol. Univ. Recife vol.291: 11 in 1960.

The genus name of Yamamotoa is in honour of Wataro Yamamoto, who was a Japanese botanist (Mycology). He worked at the Hyogo University for Agriculture. In 1934, he wrote 'Cercospora from Formosa'.

== Species ==
As accepted by Species Fungorum;

- Yamamotoa carludovicae (Bat.) Arx & E. Müll. (1975)
- Yamamotoa guarapensis Bat. & Maia (1960)

Former species; Yamamotoa bomjardinensis Bat. (1960) = Lembosia bomjardinensis, Asterinaceae
