= Takagi Station =

Takagi Station is the name of three train stations in Japan:

- Takagi Station (Hiroshima) (高木駅)
- Takagi Station (Toyama) (高儀駅)
- Takagi Station (Hyōgo) (高木駅) - closed
