= Bessho Station =

Bessho Station may refer to:

- Otsu-shiyakusho-mae Station, formerly called Bessho Station until 2018, in Shiga Prefecture, Japan
- Bessho Station (Hyōgo), closed in 2008, in Hyōgo Prefecture, Japan
