= Miki Railway Miki Line =

Railway line in Hyōgo Prefecture, Japan

Miki Line
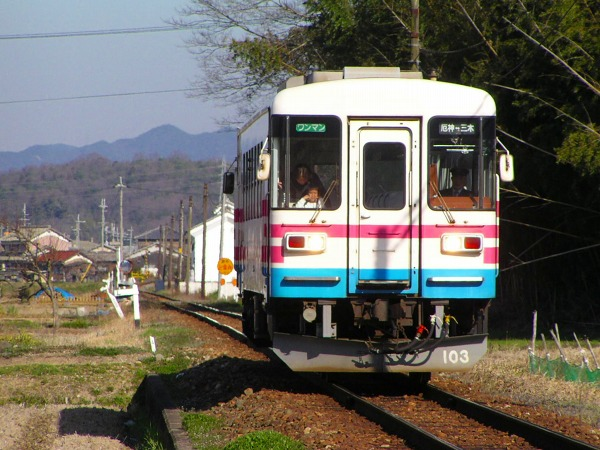
- Train on Miki Line near Nishi-Hōda

Overview
- Native name: 三木線
- Owner: Miki Railway
- Locale: Hyōgo Prefecture
- Termini: Yakujin; Miki
- Stations: 9

History
- Opened: 1916
- Closed: 2008

Technical
- Line length: 6.6 km (4.1 mi)
- Track gauge: 1,067 mm (3 ft 6 in)

The Miki Line (三木線, Miki-sen) was a Japanese railway line in Hyōgo Prefecture, between Yakujin Station in Kakogawa and Miki Station in Miki. This was the only railway line Miki Railway Company (三木鉄道株式会社, Miki Tetsudō) operated. The line linked Miki and the West Japan Railway Company Kakogawa Line at Yakujin station.

== Basic data ==
- Distance: 6.6 kilometres (4.1 mi)
- Gauge: 3 ft 6 in (1,067 mm)
- Stations: 9
- Track: Single
- Power: Internal combustion (Diesel)
- Railway signalling: Staff token

== History ==
The Banshū Railway (播州鉄道, Banshū Tetsudō) opened the line from 1916 to 1917. The railway was acquired by the Bantan Railway (播丹鉄道, Bantan Tetsudō) in 1923 and nationalised in 1943 together with other Bantan Railway lines, i.e. the Kakogawa Line, the Takasago Line, the Kajiya Line and the Hōjō Line.

Freight services ceased in 1974. Miki Railway, a third sector company, took over the line from Japanese National Railways in 1985.

The majority of commuters used Kobe Electric Railway's (Shintetsu) Ao Line to get to Kobe instead of the Miki–Kakogawa Line route. As a result, Miki Railway had been unable to justify continued financial support from the city. On March 1, 2007, the Miki City Council officially decided to abandon the line with the company agreeing on April 26, 2007. The line was closed on April 1, 2008. This was the fourth third-sector railway operator to cease operations, and the fifth third-sector line closed.

== Stations ==
Name		Distance (km)	Connections	Location	
Yakujin	厄神	0.0	JR West: Kakogawa Line	Hyōgo	Kakogawa
Kunikane	国包	1.0		Hyōgo	Kakogawa
Sōsa	宗佐	1.5		Hyōgo	Kakogawa
Shimo-Ishino	下石野	2.0		Hyōgo	Miki
Ishino	石野	2.6		Hyōgo	Miki
Nishi-Hōda	西這田	4.3		Hyōgo	Miki
Bessho	別所	5.3		Hyōgo	Miki
Takagi	高木	6.0		Hyōgo	Miki
Miki	三木	6.6		Hyōgo	Miki

== See also ==
- List of railway companies in Japan
- List of railway lines in Japan
