= Hyogo Agricultural College =

- 兵庫農業短期大学
- Established: 1951
- Academic staff: Agriculture; Horticulture
- Location: Kakogawa, Hyōgo, Japan
- Website: http://www.kobe-u.ac.jp/info/outline/history/nogakubu.html

Hyogo Agricultural College (兵庫農業短期大学, Hyōgo Nōgyō Tanki Daigaku) was a junior college in Kakogawa, Hyōgo, Japan.

== History ==
The junior college was founded in 1951. It offered courses in agriculture and horticulture. In 1966, it was merged into Kobe University to become that institution's Faculty of Agriculture.
