= Kanno Station =

Railway station in Kakogawa, Hyōgo Prefecture, Japan

Kanno Station 神野駅
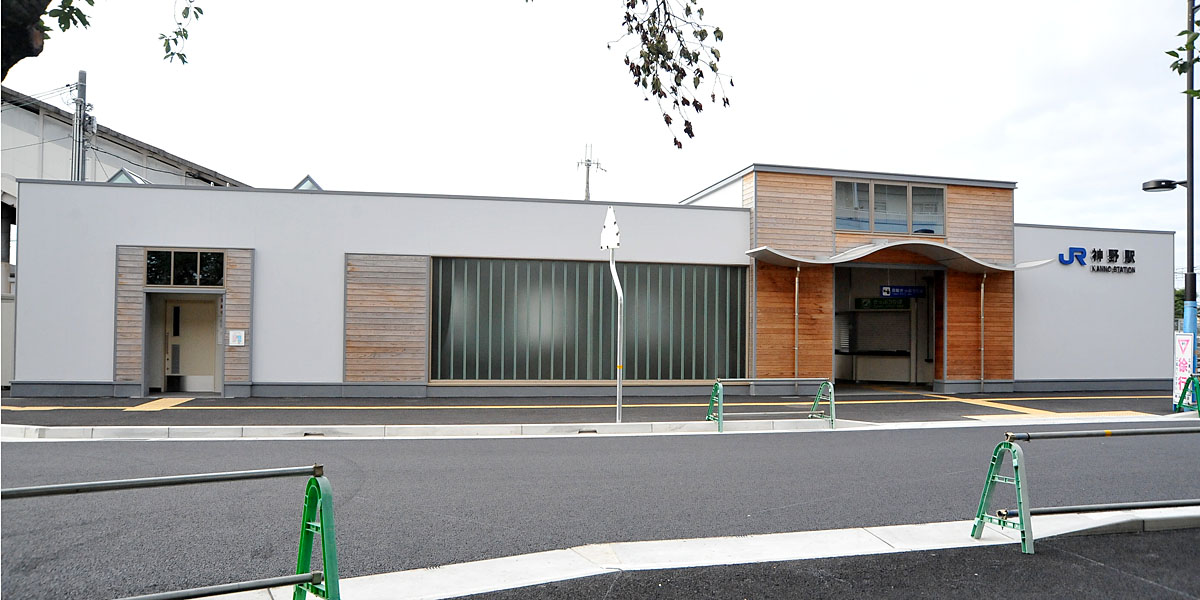
- Kanno Station north exit, 2010

General information
- Location: Saijō Kanno-chō, Kakogawa-shi, Hyōgo-ken 675-0009; Japan
- Coordinates: 34.7910°N 134.8787°E
- Operator: JR West
- Line: I Kakogawa Line
- Distance: 4.8 km (3.0 miles) from Kakogawa
- Platforms: 2 side platforms
- Connections: Bus stop

Other information
- Status: Unstaffed
- Website: Official website

History
- Opened: 1 April 1913

Passengers
- FY2019: 1057 daily

Services
Preceding station	JR West	Following station
Hioka towards Kakogawa	Kakogawa Line Local	Yakujin towards Tanikawa
Location
- Location within Hyōgo Prefecture Location within Japan

Kanno Station (神野駅, Kanno-eki) is a passenger railway station located in the city of Kakogawa, Hyōgo Prefecture, Japan, operated by West Japan Railway Company (JR West).

== Lines ==
Kanno Station is served by the Kakogawa Line and is 4.8 kilometers from the terminus of the line at Kakogawa.

== Station layout ==
The station consists of two ground-level opposed side platforms, connected to the station building by a footbridge. The station is unattended.

=== Platforms ===
1	■ Kakogawa Line	for Ao and Nishiwakishi
2	■ Kakogawa Line	for Kakogawa

== History ==
Kanno Station opened on 1 April 1913.

== Passenger statistics ==
In fiscal 2019, the station was used by an average of 1057 passengers daily

== Surrounding area ==
- Kakogawa Kita Civic Center
- Kitayama Park / Saijo Temple Ruins (National Historic Site)
- Saijō Kofun Cluster (National Historic Site)

== See also ==
- List of railway stations in Japan
