= Sōsa Station =

Railway station in Japan

Coordinates: 34°47′53.43″N 134°55′21.04″E

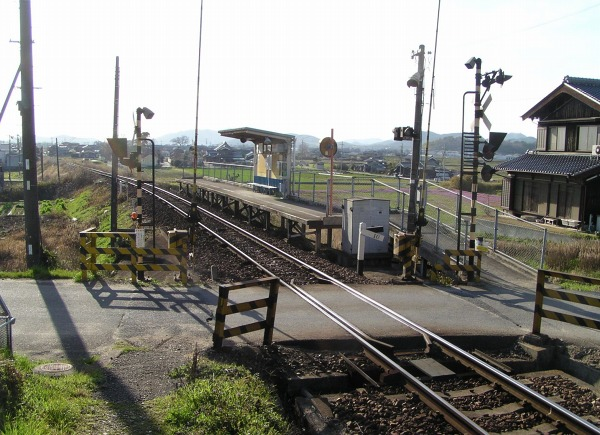
Sōsa Station

Sōsa Station (宗佐駅, Sōsa-eki) was a railway station in Kakogawa, Hyōgo Prefecture, Japan.

== Lines ==
- Miki Railway

- Miki Line - Abandoned on April 1, 2008

== Adjacent stations ==
«	Service	»
Miki Railway (Abandoned)
Miki Line
Kunikane	-	Shimo-Ishino
