= Nishi-Hōda Station =

Railway station in Japan

Coordinates: 34°47′42.1″N 134°57′6.3″E

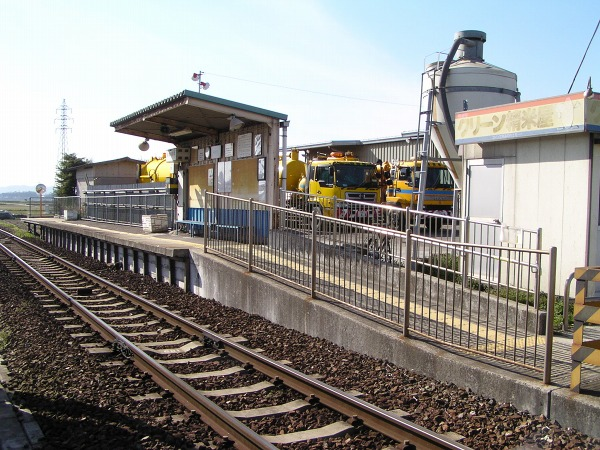
Nishi-Hōda Station

Nishi-Hōda Station (西這田駅, Nishi-Hōda-eki) was a railway station in Miki, Hyōgo Prefecture, Japan.

== Lines ==
- Miki Railway

- Miki Line - Abandoned on April 1, 2008

== Adjacent stations ==
«	Service	»
Miki Railway (Abandoned)
Miki Line
Ishino	-	Bessho
