= Hioka Station =

Railway station in Kakogawa, Hyōgo Prefecture, Japan

Hioka Station 日岡駅
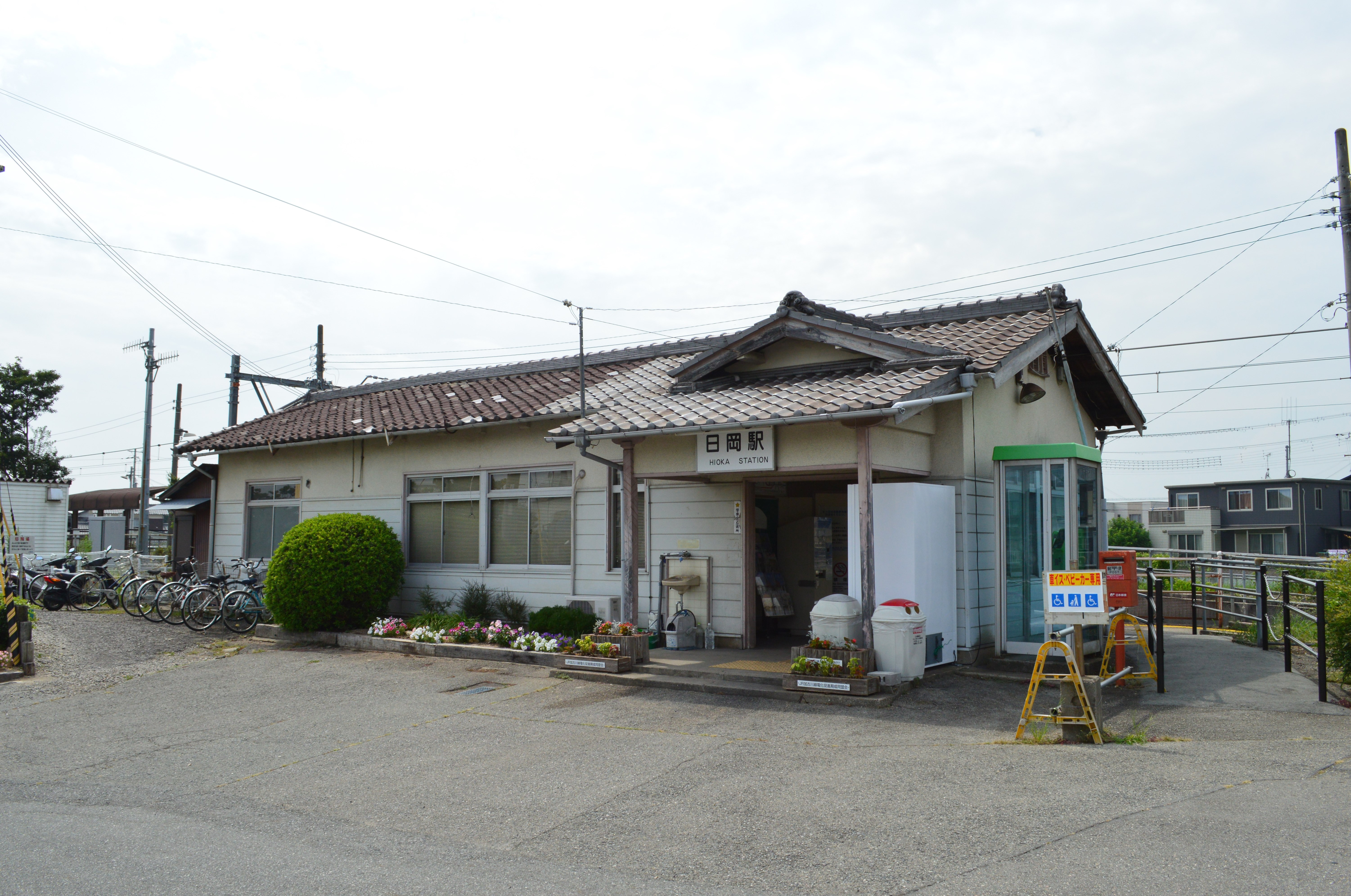
- Hioka Station in August 2015

General information
- Location: Ono Kakogawa-chō, Kakogawa-shi, Hyōgo-ken 675-0061; Japan
- Coordinates: 34°46′43.31″N 134°51′26.62″E
- Operator: JR West
- Line: I Kakogawa Line
- Distance: 2.3 km (1.4 miles) from Kakogawa
- Platforms: 2 side platforms
- Connections: Bus stop

Other information
- Status: Unstaffed
- Website: Official website

History
- Opened: 1 April 1913

Passengers
- FY2019: 822 daily

Services
Preceding station	JR West	Following station
Kakogawa Terminus	Kakogawa Line Local	Kanno towards Tanikawa
Location
- Location within Hyōgo Prefecture Location within Japan

Hioka Station (日岡駅, Hioka-eki) is a passenger railway station located in the city of Kakogawa, Hyōgo Prefecture, Japan, operated by West Japan Railway Company (JR West).

== Lines ==
Hioka Station is served by the Kakogawa Line and is 2.3 kilometers from the terminus of the line at Kakogawa

== Station layout ==
The station consists of two unnumbered ground-level opposed side platforms, connected to the station building by a level crossing. The station is unattended.

=== Platforms ===
station side	■ Kakogawa Line	for Kakogawa
opposite side	■ Kakogawa Line	for Ao and Nishiwakishi

== History ==
Hioka Station opened on April 1, 1913.

== Passenger statistics ==
In fiscal 2019, the station was used by an average of 537 passengers daily

== See also ==
- List of railway stations in Japan
