= Ichiba Station (JR West) =

Railway station in Ono, Hyōgo Prefecture, Japan

Ichiba Station 市場駅
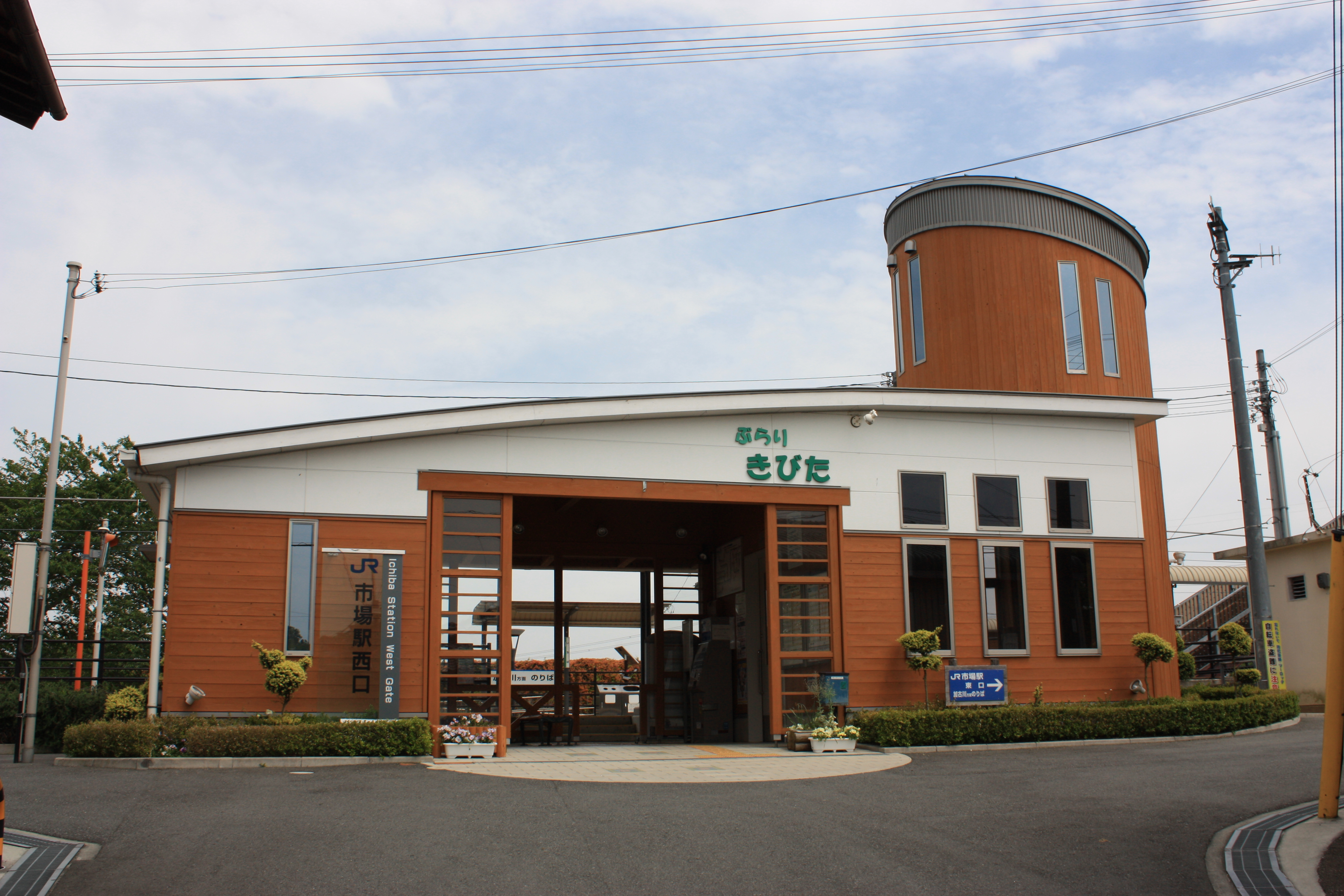
- Ichiba Station west entrance in May 2010

General information
- Location: Kibita-chō, Ono-shi, Hyōgo-ken 675-1345; Japan
- Coordinates: 34°49′10″N 134°55′57″E
- Operator: JR West
- Line: I Kakogawa Line
- Distance: 11.5 km (7.1 miles) from Kakogawa
- Platforms: 2 side platforms
- Connections: Bus stop

Construction
- Structure type: Ground level

Other information
- Status: Unstaffed
- Website: Official website

History
- Opened: 10 August 1913

Passengers
- FY2019: 196 daily

Services
Preceding station	JR West	Following station
Yakujin towards Kakogawa	Kakogawa Line Local	Onomachi towards Tanikawa
Location
- Location within Hyōgo Prefecture Location within Japan

Ichiba Station (市場駅, Ichiba-eki) is a passenger railway station located in the city of Ono, Hyōgo Prefecture, Japan, operated by West Japan Railway Company (JR West).

== Lines ==
Ichiba Station is served by the Kakogawa Line and is 11.5 kilometers from the terminus of the line at Kakogawa

== Station layout ==
The station consists of two ground-level opposed side platforms connected by a footbridge. The station is unattended.

=== Platforms ===
1	■ Kakogawa Line	for Ao and Nishiwakishi
2	■ Kakogawa Line	for Kakogawa

== History ==
Ichiba Station opened on 10 August 1913. With the privatization of JNR on 1 April 1987, the station came under the control of JR West.

== Passenger statistics ==
In fiscal 2019, the station was used by an average of 196 passengers daily

== Surrounding area ==
- Hakuundani Onsen Yupika

== See also ==
- List of railway stations in Japan
