= Saijō Kofun Cluster =

Kofun period burial mound cluster in Kakogawa, Japan

Saijō Kofun cluster
- 西条古墳群 (Japanese)
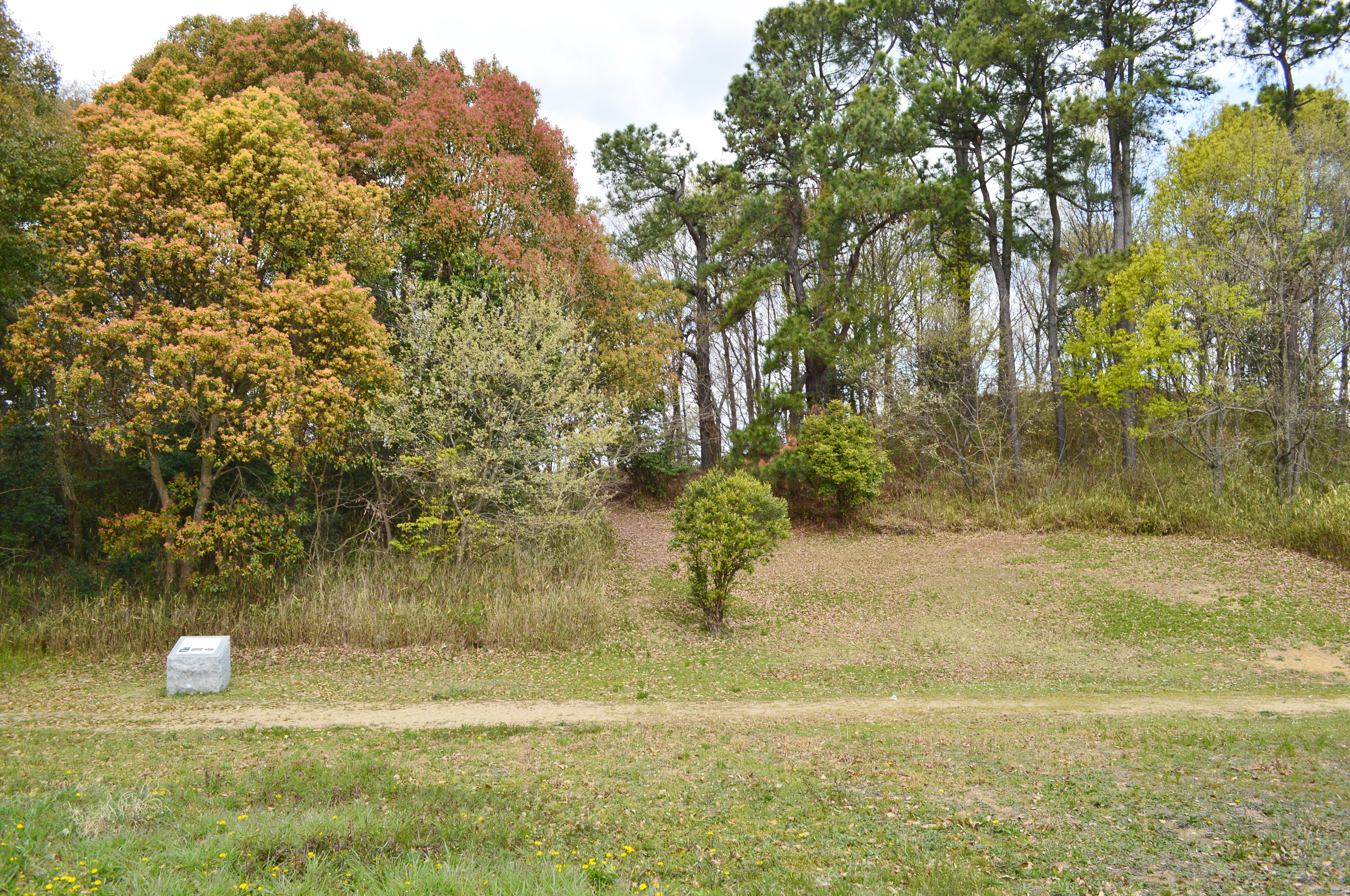
- Gyōjazuka Kofun within the Saijō Kofun cluster

- Saijō Kofun cluster Saijō Kofun Cluster (Japan)
- Interactive map of Saijō Kofun cluster
- 34°46′54.95″N 134°53′18.10″E
- Type: Kofun
- Periods: Kofun period
- Location: Kakogawa, Hyōgo, Japan
- Region: Kansai region

History
- Built: late 4th - mid-5th century AD

Site notes
- Public access: Yes

The Saijō Kofun cluster (西条古墳群) is a group of three kofun burial mounds located in the Yamate neighborhood of the city of Kakogawa, Hyōgo Prefecture, in the Kansai region of Japan. The tumuli were collectively designated a National Historic Site in 1973.

== Overview ==
The Saijō Kofun cluster is located on a long terrace extending north from the Innanno Plateau on the east bank of the Kakogawa River, about ten kilometers from the river's mouth. The cluster consisted of dozens of tumuli, but most were destroyed due to the development of residential land, and now only three remain. An archaeological excavation was conducted in 1995-1996

The Gyōjazuka Kofun (行者塚古墳) is a zenpō-kōen-fun (前方後円墳), which is shaped like a keyhole, having one square end and one circular end, when viewed from above. It is orientated to the southwest and has an overall length of around 99 meters, making it the largest in Kakogawa City and one of the largest in the Harima region. On the surface of the mound, in addition to fukiishi, a row of cylindrical haniwa can be seen. In addition, two extensions on the left and right of the mound constriction and two locations on the rear circle exist, which are believed to have had a ceremonial purpose, as representational haniwa have been found. The tumulus's surrounded by a double moat. The burial facilities in the posterior circular portion consist of three clay burials, which have not been investigated. Two more burials were found in the anterior portion, which included grave goods such as gold and copper engraved metal fittings, an iron ax, tubular bronze products, horse harness, and iron swords. It is estimated that this burial mound was built in the middle of the Kofun period, around the end of the 4th century to early 5th century. The horse harness is the oldest to have been discovered in the Kinai region of Japan, and the style of the grave goods indicates a strong cultural connection with the Korean Peninsula and mainland Asia.

The Hitozuka Kofun (人塚古墳) and the Amazuka Kofun (尼塚古墳) are both large circular enpun (円墳)-style mounds, surrounded yay moats. Neither has been excavated, but they are believed to date from the 5th century.

The site is open to the public as an archaeological park, and is located about a 15-minute walk from Kanno Station on the JR West Kakogawa Line.

Saijō Kofun cluster
Name	Location	Type	Size	Date
Gyōjazuka Kofun	34°46′54.95″N 134°53′18.10″E	keyhole	length 99m posterior circular portion: 68 m dia anterior width:55m	late 4 - early 5th C
Hitozuka Kofun	34°47′0.70″N 134°53′10.05″E	Circular	dia 61.5m height10.4m	early 5th C
Amazuka Kofun	34°46′53.75″N 134°53′11.90″E	Circular	diameter45m height 6m	mid-5th C

== Gallery ==
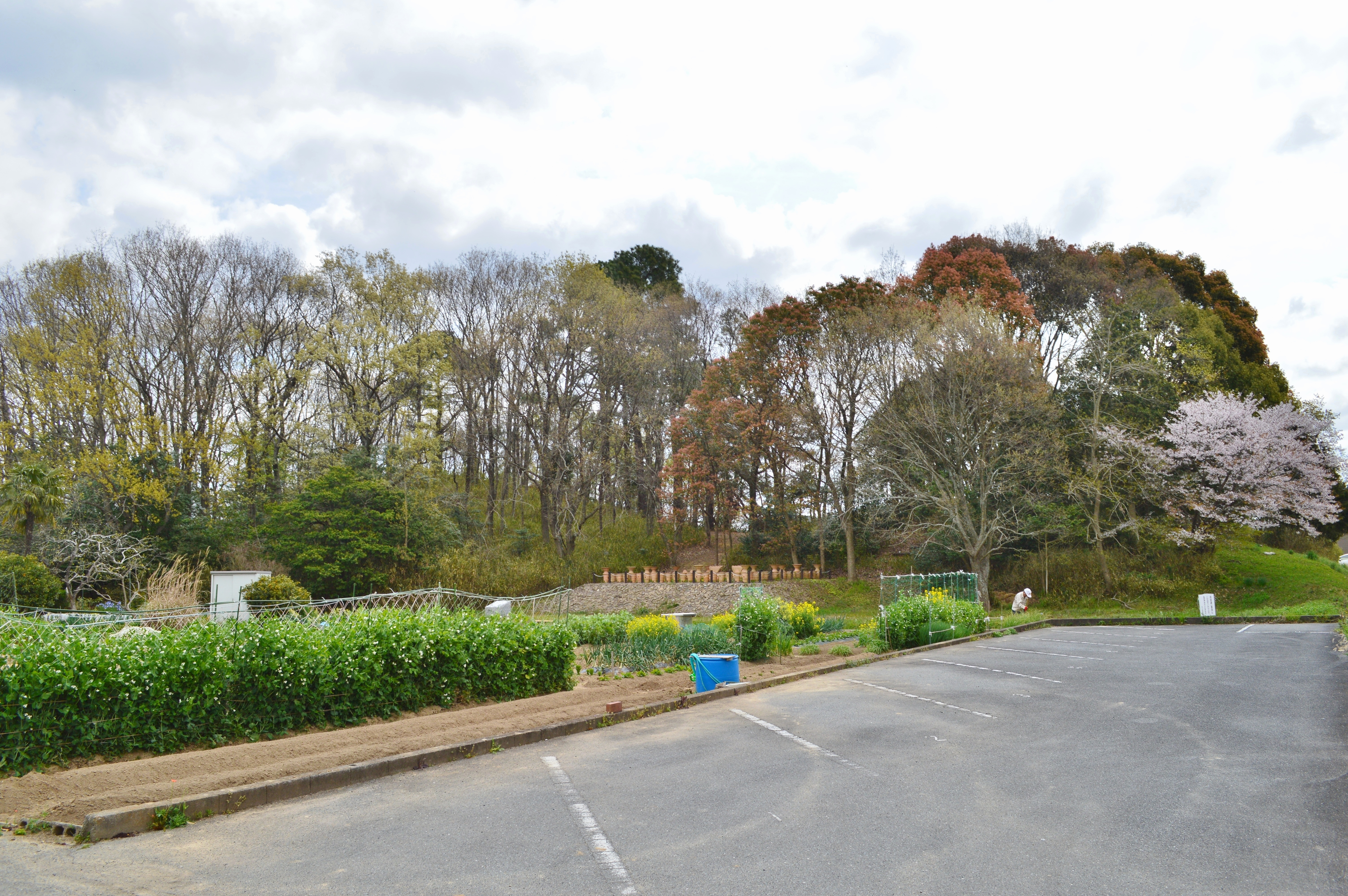
Gyōjazuka Kofun

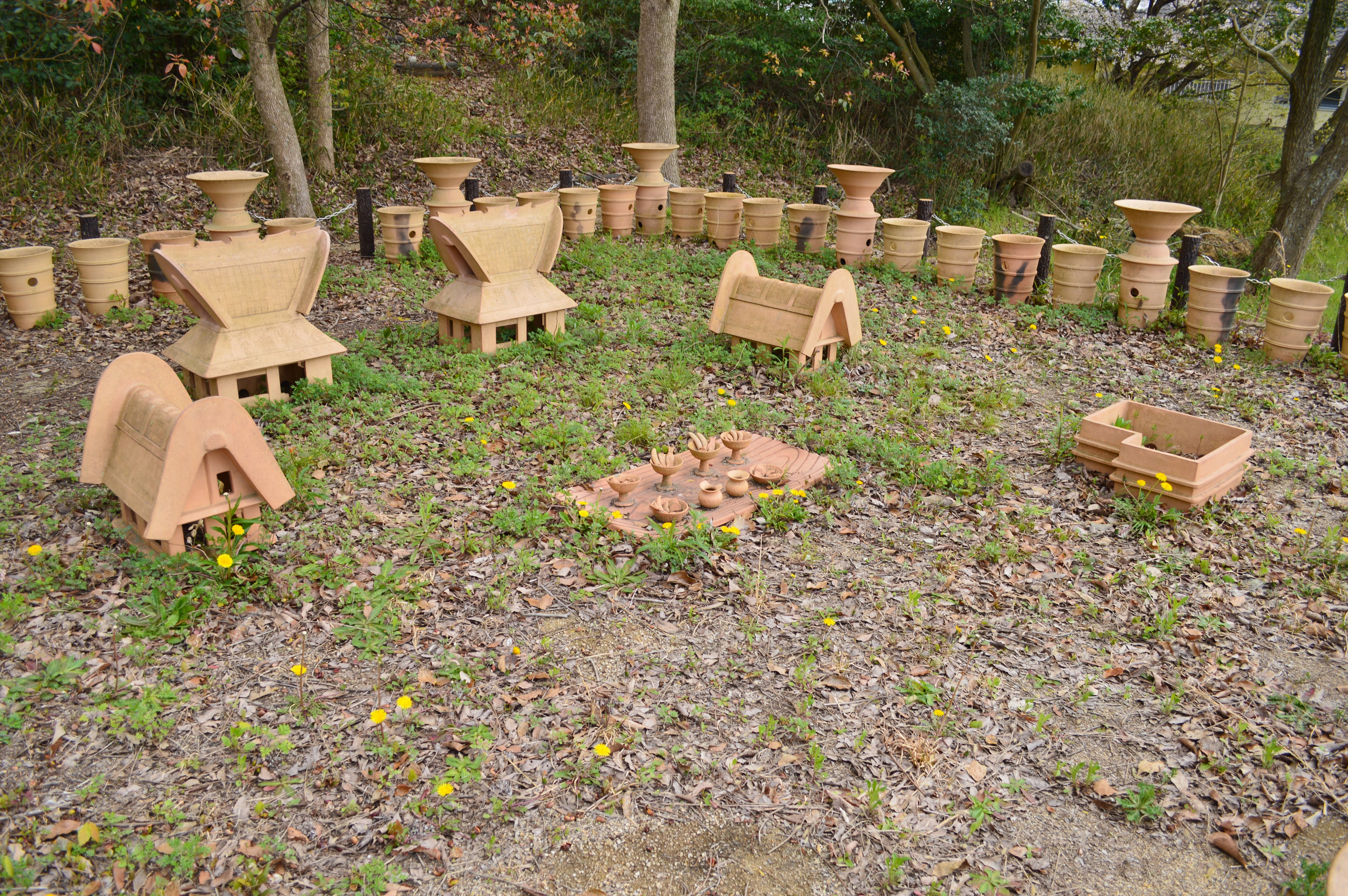
Gyōjazuka Kofun, ceremonial platform

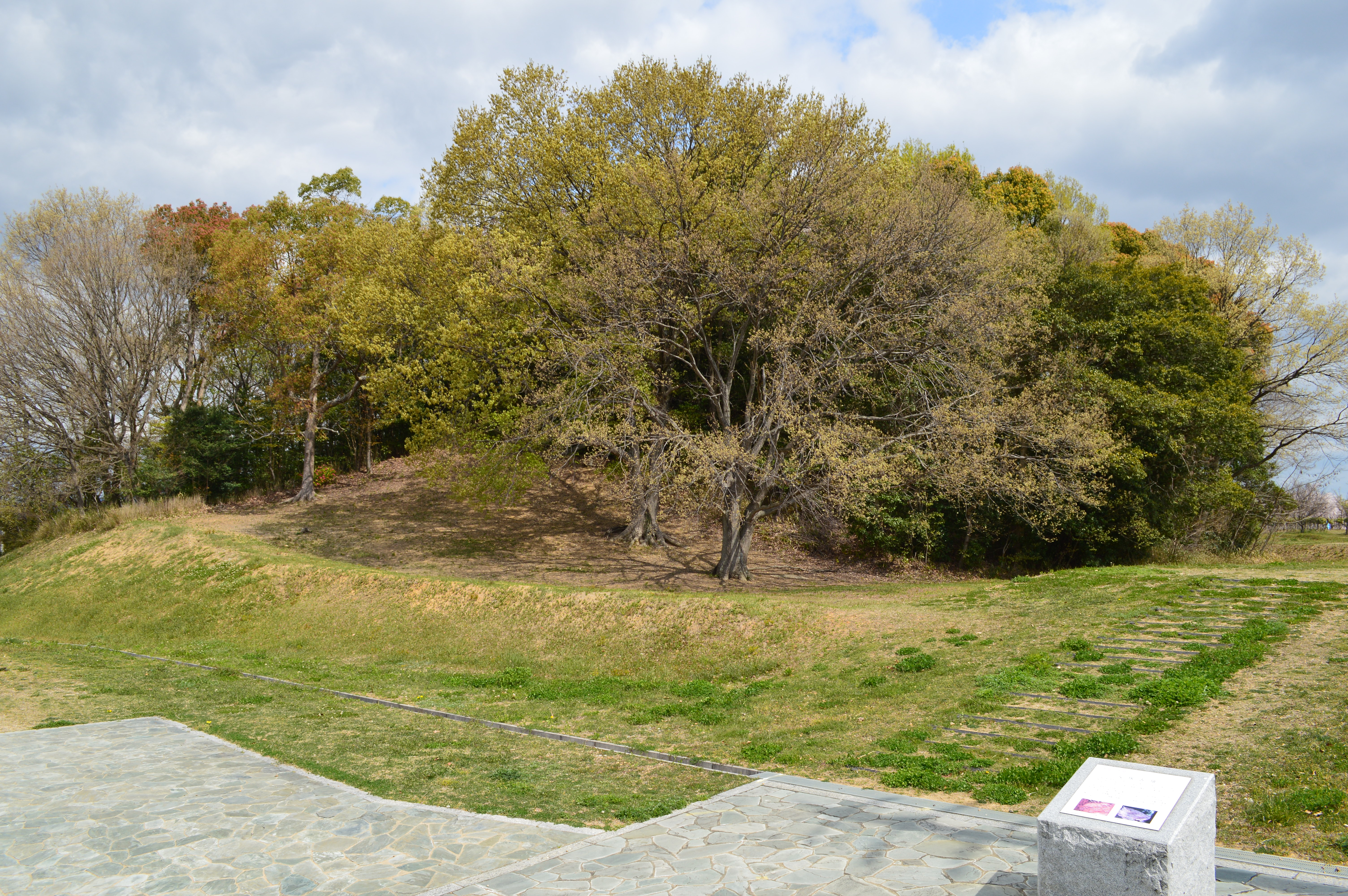
Hitozuka Kofun

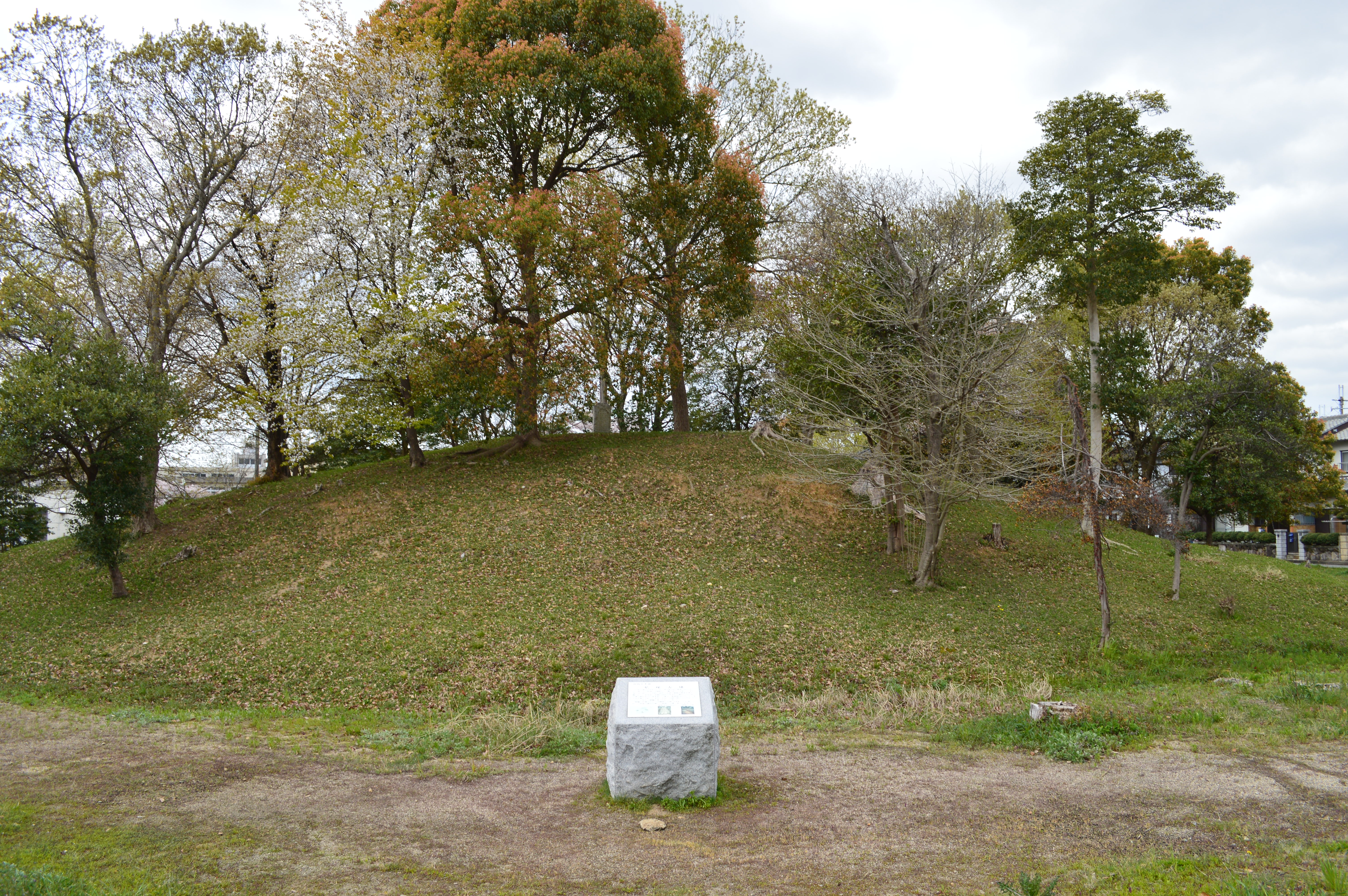
Amazuka Kofun

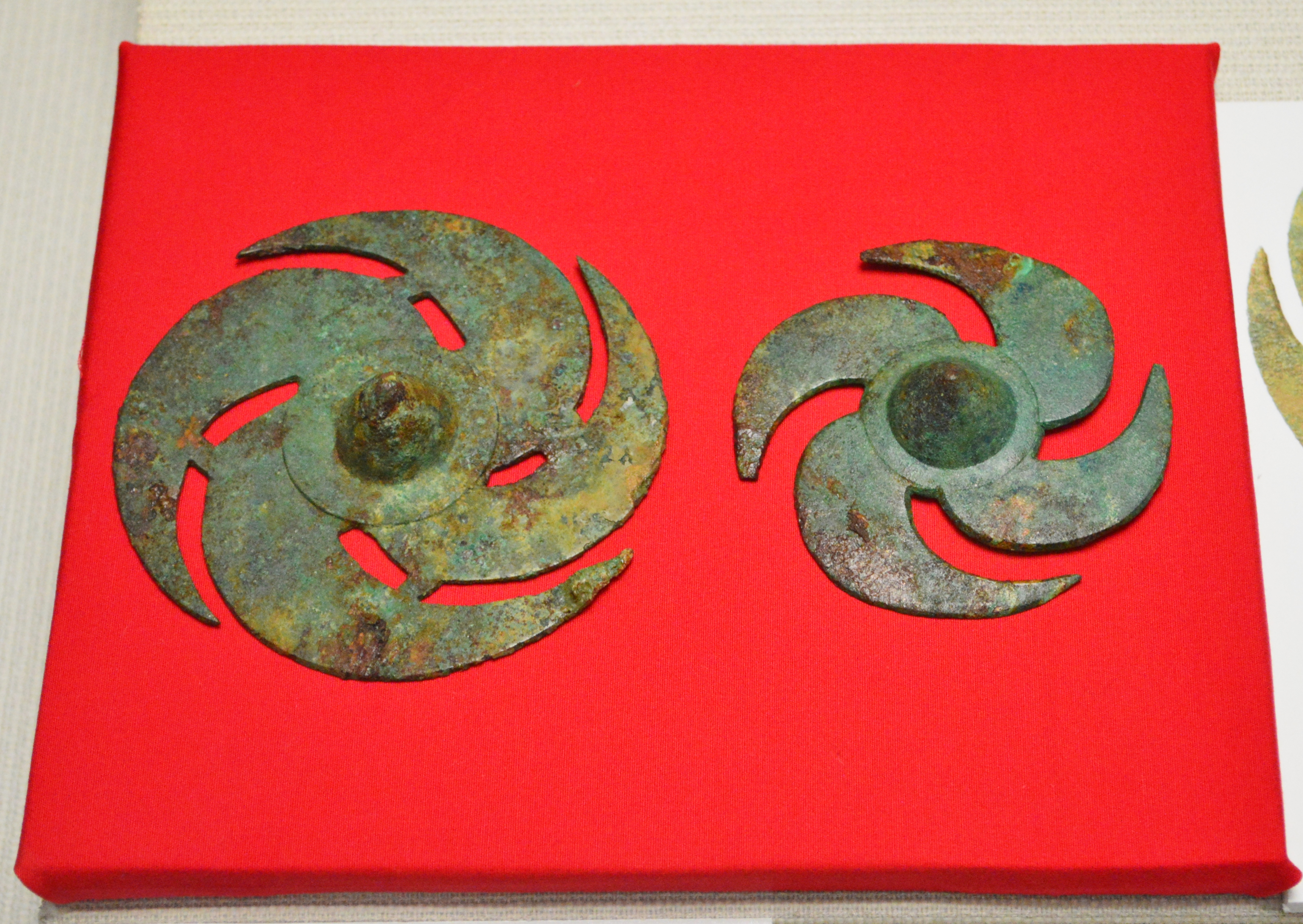
Artifacts recovered from the Gyōjazuka Kofun

== See also ==
- List of Historic Sites of Japan (Hyōgo)
