= Yakujin Station =

Railway station in Kakogawa, Hyōgo Prefecture, Japan

Yakujin Station 厄神駅
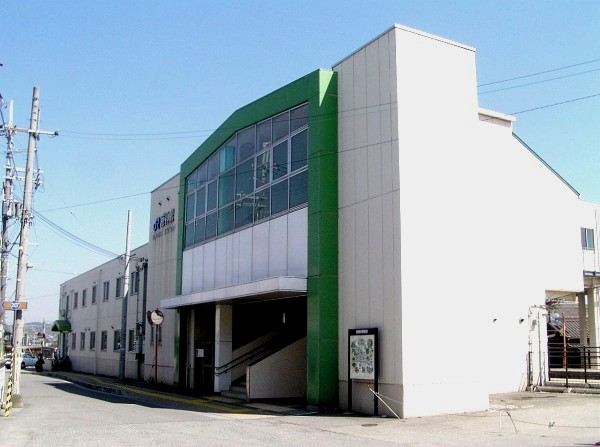
- Yakujin Station in March 2006

General information
- Location: Saijō Kanno-chō, Kakogawa-shi, Hyōgo-ken 675-0009; Japan
- Coordinates: 34.7946°N 134.9070°E
- Operator: JR West
- Line: I Kakogawa Line
- Distance: 7.4 km (4.6 miles) from Kakogawa
- Platforms: 2 side platforms
- Connections: Bus stop

Other information
- Status: Unstaffed
- Website: Official website

History
- Opened: 1 April 1913
- Former names: Kunikane (to 1916)

Passengers
- FY2019: 822 daily

Services
Preceding station	JR West	Following station
Kanno towards Kakogawa	Kakogawa Line Local	Ichiba towards Tanikawa
Location
- Location within Hyōgo Prefecture Location within Japan

Yakujin Station (厄神駅, Yakujin-eki) is a passenger railway station located in the city of Kakogawa, Hyōgo Prefecture, Japan, operated by West Japan Railway Company (JR West).

== Lines ==
Yakujin Station is served by the Kakogawa Line and is 7.4 kilometers from the terminus of the line at Kakogawa.

The Miki Railway, which stopped operations in April 2008, had used Yakujin Station via the Miki Line.

== Station layout ==
The station consists of two ground-level opposed side platforms, connected by an elevated station building. The station is unattended.

=== Platforms ===
1	■ Kakogawa Line	for Ao and Nishiwakishi
2	■ Kakogawa Line	for Kakogawa

== Adjacent stations ==
«	Service	»
Miki Railway (Abandoned)
Miki Line
Terminus	-	Kunikane

== History ==
Hioka Station opened on 1 April 1913 as Kunikane Station (国包駅). It was renamed on 22 November 1916.

== Passenger statistics ==
In fiscal 2019, the station was used by an average of 537 passengers daily

== Surrounding area ==
- Sosa Yakujin Hachiman Shrine
- Miyayama Ruins
- Kakogawa City Yawata Elementary School

== See also ==
- List of railway stations in Japan
