= 1987 in rail transport =

This article lists events related to rail transport that occurred in 1987.

== Events ==
=== January events ===
- January 4 – Maryland train collision – Amtrak and Conrail trains collide in Maryland, killing 16 people.
- January 18 – A fire starts on Aylmer Manor, one of the Manor series sleeping cars used by Via Rail, forcing VIA to take the car out of regular service permanently.

=== February events ===
- February 2 – The Irish national transport operator Córas Iompair Éireann (CIÉ) is split up into subsidiaries, with Iarnród Éireann (Irish Rail) taking responsibility for the Irish railway network in the Republic of Ireland.

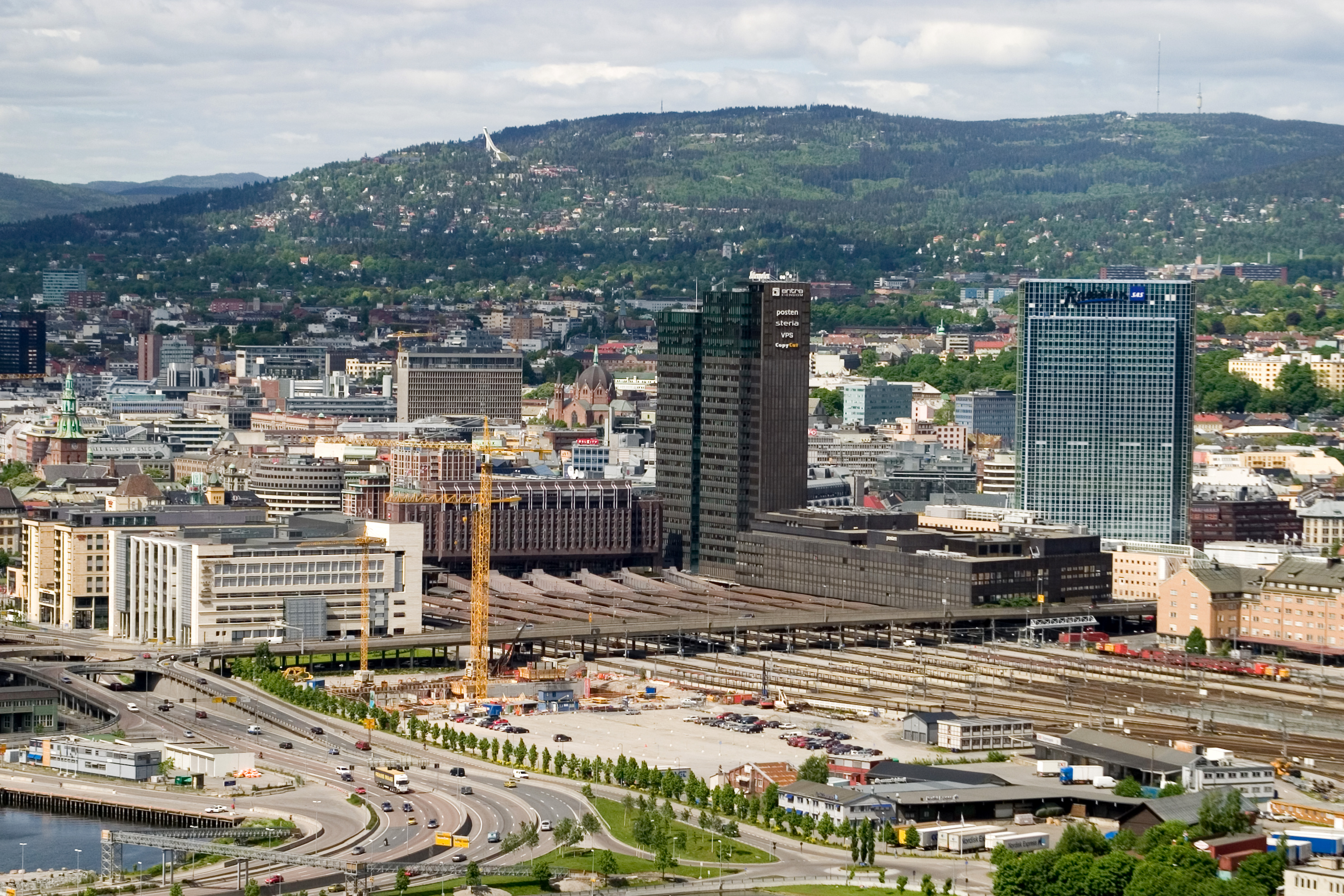
Oslo Central Station

- February 12 – Oslo Central Station in Oslo, Norway is officially opened, and the western station Oslo Vestbanestasjon closes.

=== March events ===
- March 12 – The Sacramento Regional Transit District opens the first line of its new light rail system, in Sacramento, California.

=== April events ===
- April 1 – The Japanese National Railways (JNR) are divided and privatized. The seven companies of Japan Railways Group (JR Group) succeed the former JNR.
- April 4 – The Soo Line railroad announces the sale of its Lake States Transportation Division to private investors, forming the new Wisconsin Central Transportation Corporation.
- April 18 – The Midosuji Line in Osaka, Japan, is extended from Abiko to Nakamozu.
- April 27 – Construction begins in Germany on the Berlin U-Bahn's U8 line extension to Paracelsus-Bad.
- April 30 – The Baltimore and Ohio merges into the Chesapeake and Ohio Railway, ending its 160-year existence.

=== May events ===
- May 6 – A Spanish-built Pendolino, RENFE Class 443, achieveS a speed record for Spain of 206 km/h.
- May 11 – British Rail renames Second class as Standard class.

=== July events ===
- July 13 – Union Pacific Railroad files with the Interstate Commerce Commission to acquire the Missouri–Kansas–Texas Railroad.
- July 13 – Namboku Line open, for first time of Sendai Subway, northern Japan.
- July 19 – New short line railroad Red River Valley and Western Railroad begins operations over 667 miles (1,073.4 km) of former BN tracks in North Dakota.
- July 25
  - Indian Railways installs its first solid state interlocking at Srirangam, India.
  - The East Lancashire Railway, a heritage railway in North West England, opens between Bury and Ramsbottom.

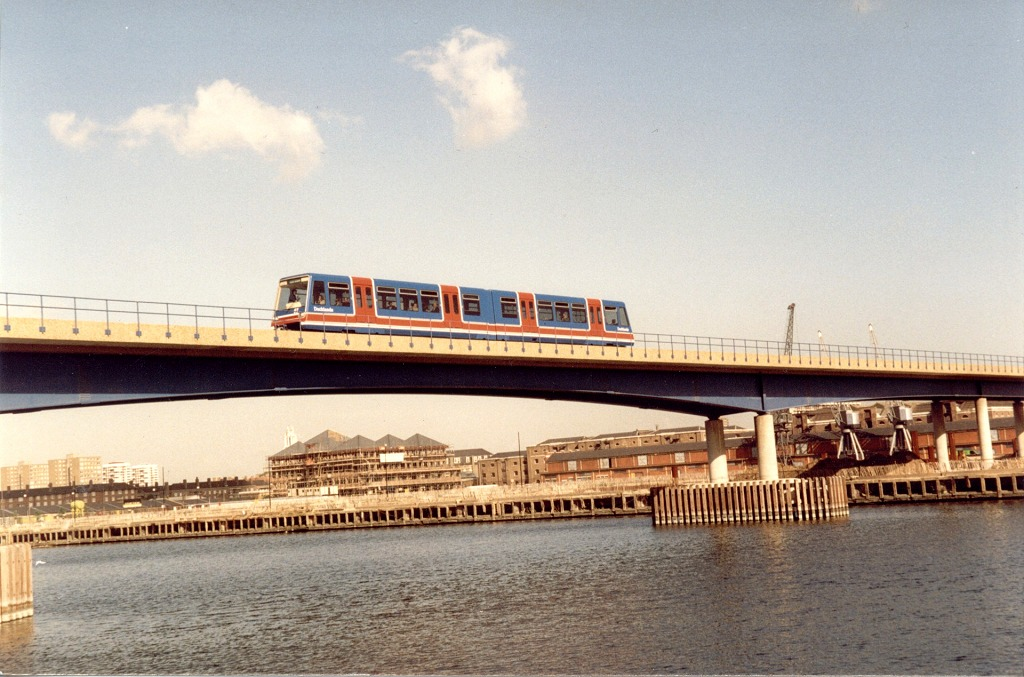
Docklands Light Railway crossing West India Dock when new

- July 31 – Queen Elizabeth II presides over the opening ceremonies of the Docklands Light Railway in London, England.

=== August events ===
- August 7 – Kamensk-Shakhtinsky rail disaster in the Soviet Union kills 106.
- August 25 – In Tokyo, Japan, the Yurakucho Line is opened between Wakoshi and Chikatetsu-narimasu.
- August 31 – The Chesapeake and Ohio Railway is merged into CSX Transportation.

=== September events ===
- September 22 – Richmond Vale railway line, New South Wales, runs last coal train to Hexham, becoming the last non-tourist railway in Australia to use steam locomotives.

=== October events ===
- October 1 – Botswana Railways created by the government to take over railways within Botswana previously operated by the National Railways of Zimbabwe.
- October 11 – Soo Line Railroad sells 2,002 miles (3,222 km) of track to the newly formed Wisconsin Central.
- October 19 – Bintaro Tragedy – a catastrophic crash near Tangerang, Indonesia kills 156 people.
- October 19 – The Glanrhyd Bridge collapse kills four people when a bridge over the River Towy near Llandeilo, Carmarthenshire in Wales is washed away by swollen water.
- October 31 – Montana Rail Link begins operations on 907 miles (1,460 km) of former Burlington Northern Railroad (originally Northern Pacific) tracks.

=== November events ===
- November 1 – British Rail establishes a world speed record for diesel traction, 238.9 km/h (148.4 mph) with a test InterCity 125 formation between Darlington and York.
- November 7 – The first 6 kilometres of the MRT line in Singapore opened.
- November 18 – King's Cross fire: 31 killed in a fire on an escalator at King's Cross tube station on the London Underground.

=== December events ===
- December 5 – Downpatrick & Ardglass Railway begins public operation, the first Irish gauge heritage railway in Ireland.
- December 11 – Santa Clara County Transit begins revenue service on the first line of its new light rail system in San Jose, California.

=== Unknown date events ===
- The United States Congress divests government ownership of Conrail in the largest initial public offering of company shares (IPO) to date.
- Line One (the Red line) of Cairo Metro opens.
- A passenger express from Kuala Lumpur to Singapore derails at high speed near Johor Bahru, Malaysia, after bolts holding the underframe-mounted air conditioning generator come off causing it to fall off and catapult the particular coach and the ones behind it off the rails. 12 people are killed in the worst accident in KTM's history.
