= Miki Station (Miki Railway) =

Railway station in Hyogo prefecture, Japan

Coordinates: 34°47′40.82″N 134°58′38.92″E

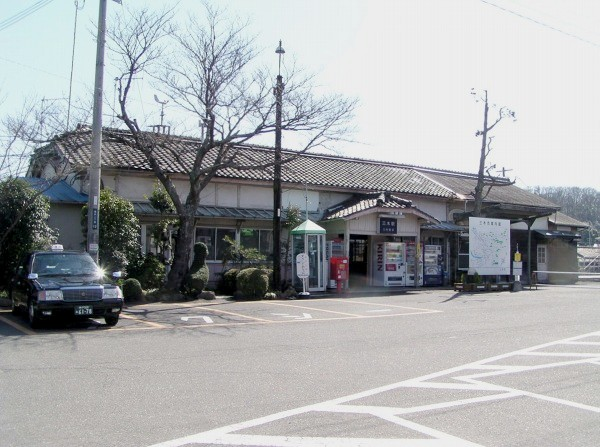
Miki Station

Miki Station (三木駅, Miki-eki) was a railway station in Miki, Hyōgo Prefecture, Japan.

== Lines ==
- Miki Railway

- Miki Line - Abandoned on April 1, 2008

== Adjacent stations ==
| « | Service | » |
Miki Line
| Takagi | - | Terminus |

== Miki Railway Memorial Park ==
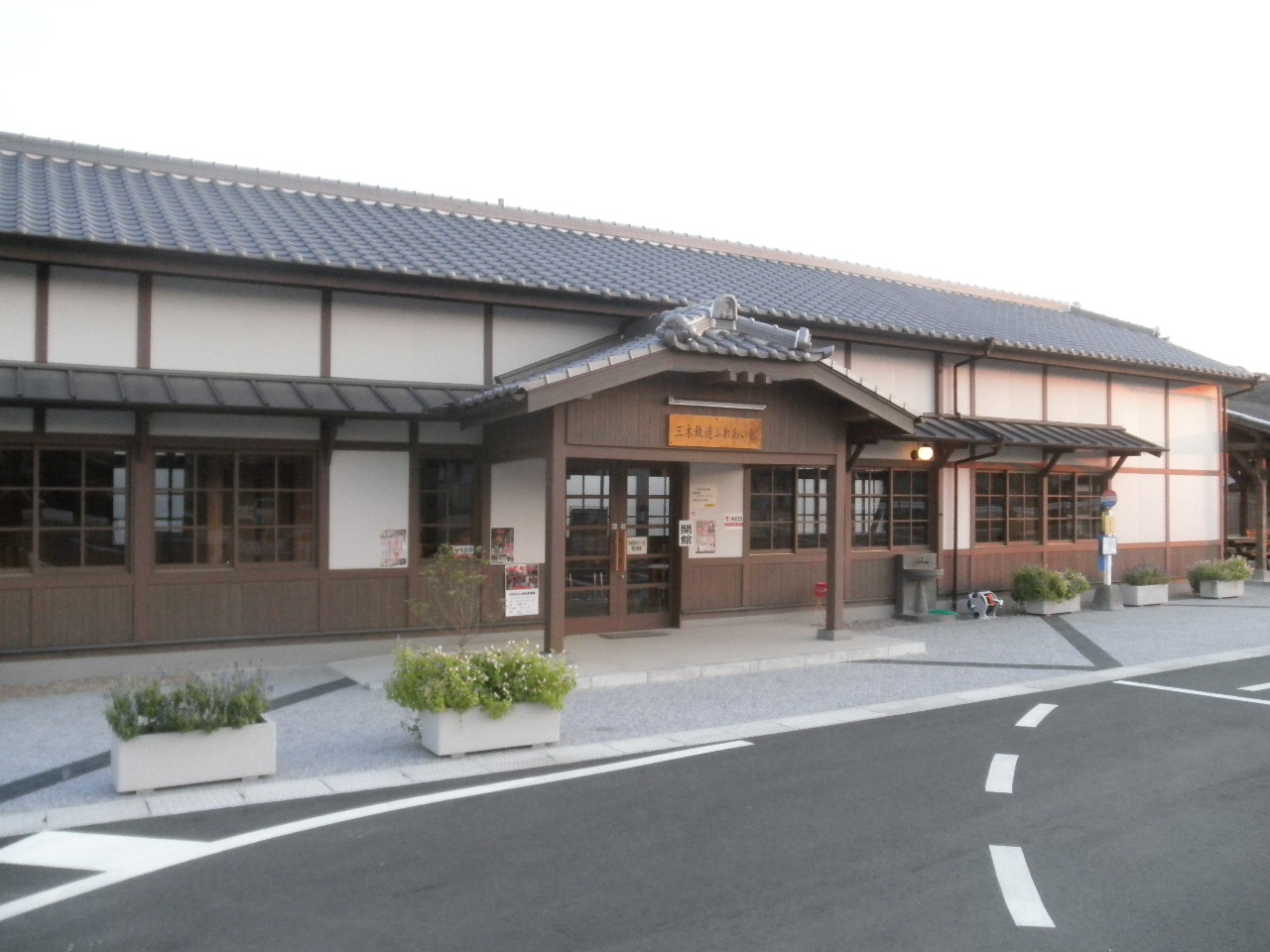
Former station building in the park

In June 2010, the former station building and the adjacent area were converted to a community facility named Miki Railway Memorial Park.
