= Bessho (surname) =

Bessho (written: 別所) is a Japanese surname. Notable people with the surname include:

- Kimie Bessho (別所 キミヱ, born 1947), Japanese para table tennis player
- Koro Bessho (別所 浩郎, born 1953), Japanese diplomat
- Nagaharu Bessho (別所 長治, 1558–1580), Japanese daimyō
- Takehiko Bessho (別所 毅彦, 1922–1999), Japanese baseball player
- Tetsuya Bessho (別所 哲也, born 1965), Japanese actor and radio presenter
- Yoshiyo Bessho (別所 吉代, 1904–2018), Japanese supercentenarian
