= Ishino Station =

Railway station in Japan

Coordinates: 34°47′41.86″N 134°56′2.18″E

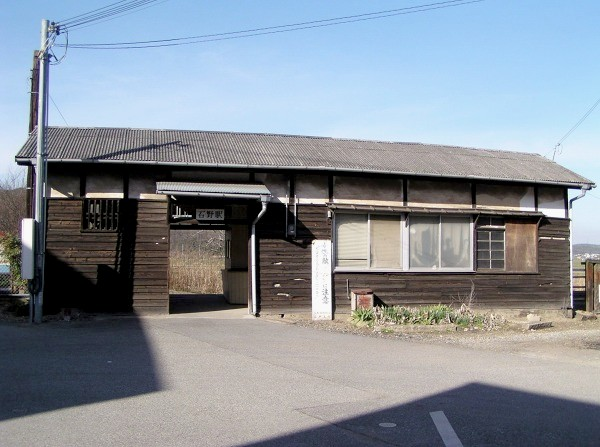
Ishino Station

Ishino Station (石野駅, Ishino-eki) was a railway station in Miki, Hyōgo Prefecture, Japan.

== Lines ==
- Miki Railway

- Miki Line - Abandoned on April 1, 2008

== Adjacent stations ==
«	Service	»
Miki Railway (Abandoned)
Miki Line
Shimo-Ishino	-	Nishi-Hōda
