= Takagi Station (Hyōgo) =

Former railway station in Miki, Hyogo prefecture, Japan

Coordinates: 34°47′37.2″N 134°58′13.37″E

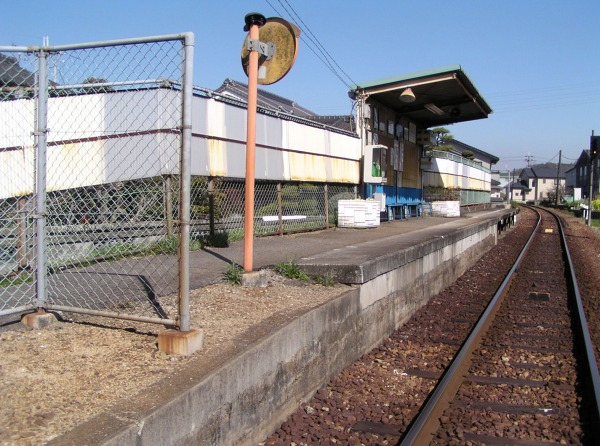
Takagi Station

Takagi Station (高木駅, Takagi-eki) was a railway station in Miki, Hyōgo Prefecture, Japan.

== Lines ==
- Miki Railway

- Miki Line - Abandoned on April 1, 2008

== Adjacent stations ==
«	Service	»
Miki Railway (Abandoned)
Miki Line
Bessho	-	Miki
