= Shimo-Ishino Station =

Railway station in Japan

Coordinates: 34°47′49.44″N 134°55′39.47″E

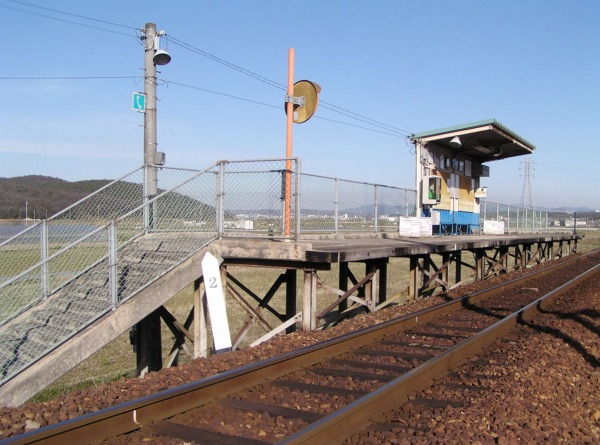
Shimo-Ishino Station

Shimo-Ishino Station (下石野駅, Shimo-Ishino-eki) was a railway station in Miki, Hyōgo Prefecture, Japan.

== Lines ==
- Miki Railway

- Miki Line - Abandoned on April 1, 2008

== Adjacent stations ==
«	Service	»
Miki Railway (Abandoned)
Miki Line
Sōsa	-	Ishino
