= Hyogo University =

Private university in Japan

Coordinates: 34°44′48″N 134°52′53″E

- 兵庫大学
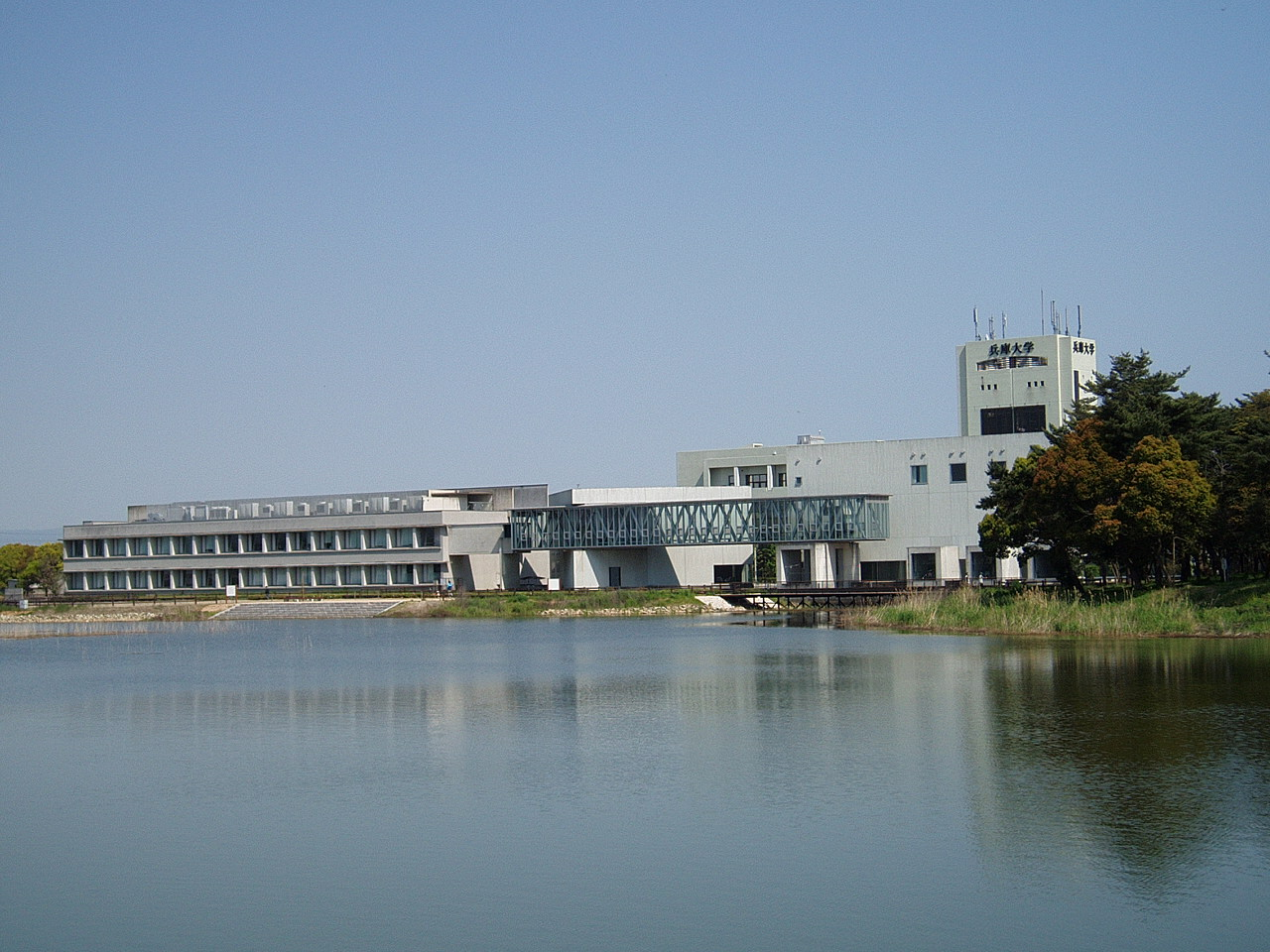
- Type: Private
- Established: Founded 1921; Chartered 1995
- President: Hideko Ohmura
- Faculty: 90 full-time
- Location: Kakogawa, Hyōgo, Japan
- Campus: Suburb
- Website: www.hyogo-dai.ac.jp/

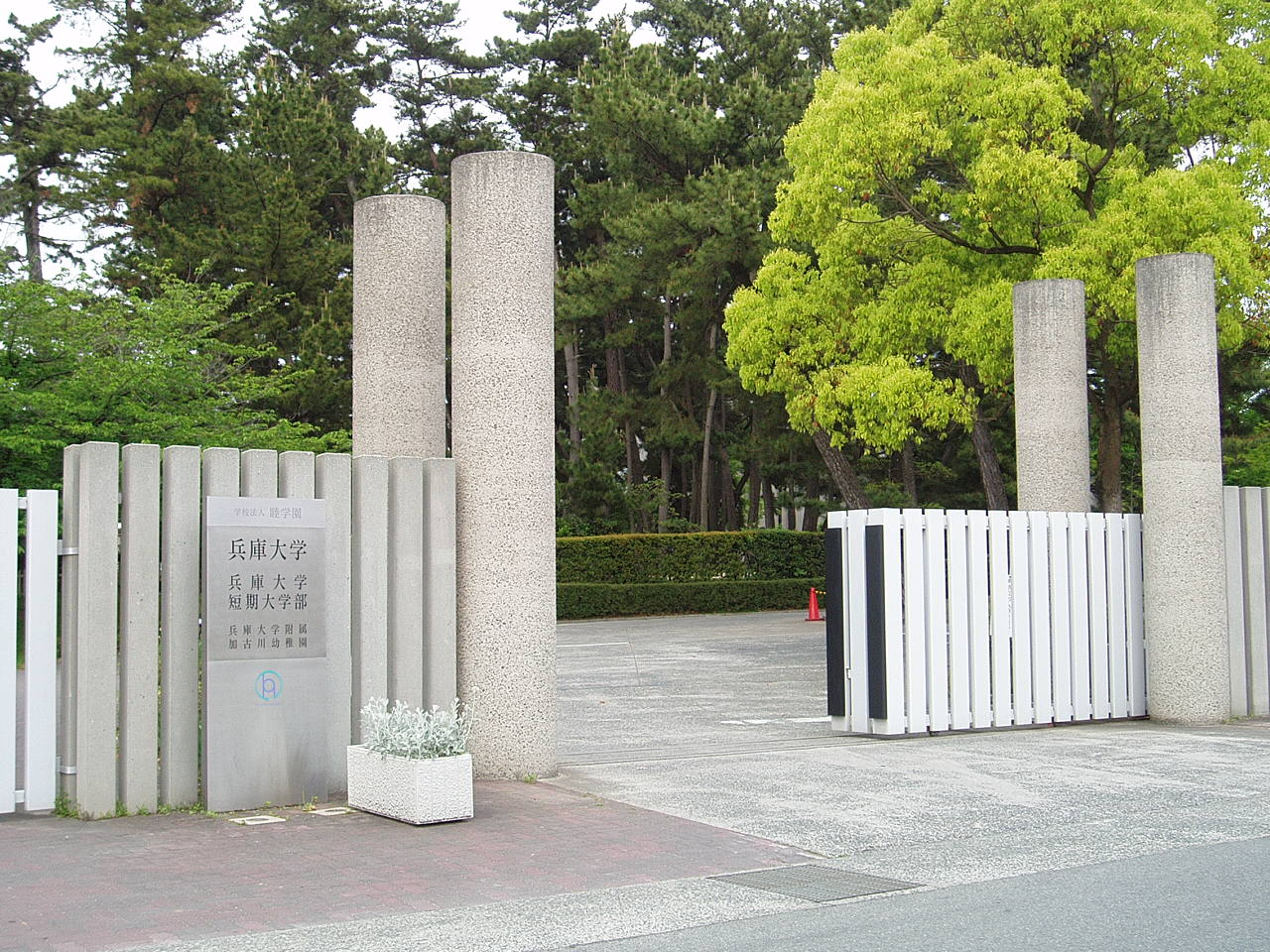
Main Gate

Hyogo University (兵庫大学, Hyōgo daigaku) is a private university in Japan. Its campus is located in Shinzaike, Hiraoka-cho, Kakogawa, Hyōgo Prefecture. The university is one of the seven schools run by Mutsumi Gakuen (睦学園), a school foundation with a Buddhist background (Nishi Hongwanji denomination).

== History ==
Mutsumi Gakuen

- 1921: Taishi Sunday School was started in memory of the 1300th anniversary of Shotoku Taishi's death.
- 1923: Suma Taishi Hall was opened in Suma-ku, Kobe, to which the Training Course of Sewing (a girls' school) was attached.
- 1937: Suma Taishi Hall Foundation was incorporated. The foundation established Suma Mutsumi Girls' Vocational School (Sumanoura Girls' High School today).
- 1951: The school foundation was renamed Mutsumi Gakuen.
- 1955: The school foundation established Mutsumi Gakuen Women's Junior College.
- 1966: The junior college was renamed Hyogo Women's Junior College, moving from Suma-ku, Kobe to Kakogawa.

Hyogo University

- 1995: Mutsumi Gakuen established Hyogo University.
  - with one faculty: Faculty of Economics and Information Science
- 1998: The junior college was reorganized into the Junior College Department of Hyogo University.
- 1999: Graduate School of Economics and Information Science was established.
- 2001: The Faculty of Health Science was added.
  - with Departments of Nutrition Management and Health System Management
- 2006: The Department of Nursing was added.

== Faculties (Undergraduate schools) ==
- Faculty of Economics and Information Science
- Faculty of Health Science
  - Department of Nutrition Management
  - Department of Health System Management
  - Department of Nursing
- Faculty of Welfare Society

== Graduate schools ==
- Graduate School of Economics and Information Science (Master's courses only)
