= Bessho Station (Hyōgo) =

Defunct railway station in Miki, Japan

Bessho Station 別所駅
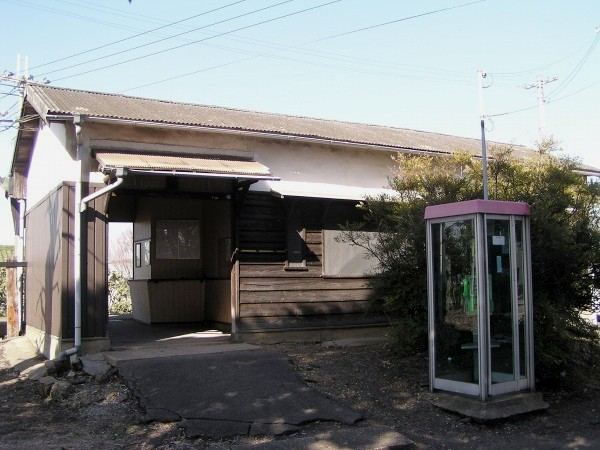
- Bessho Station in 2006

General information
- Location: Miki, Hyōgo Prefecture; Japan
- Coordinates: 34°47′40.37″N 134°57′48.06″E
- Operator: Miki Railway
- Line: Miki Line

History
- Closed: April 1, 2008
Location

Bessho Station (別所駅, Bessho-eki) was a railway station in Miki, Hyōgo Prefecture, Japan.

== Lines ==
- Miki Railway
  - Miki Line - Abandoned on April 1, 2008

== Adjacent stations ==
«	Service	»
Miki Railway (Abandoned)
Miki Line
Nishi-Hōda	-	Takagi
