= Kakogawa =

Kakogawa 加古川市
- Special city
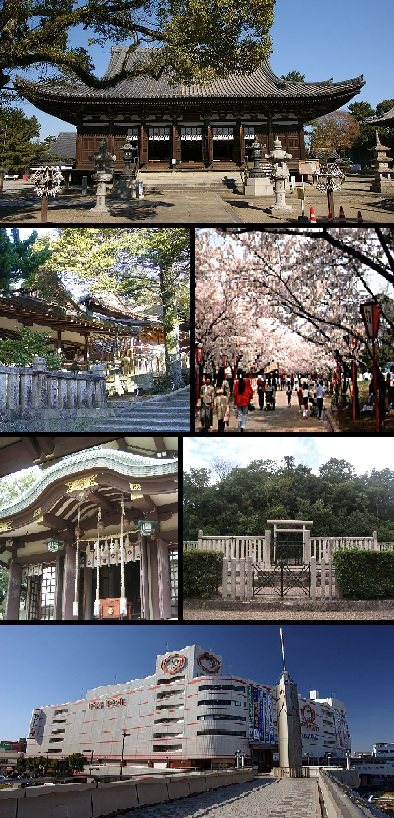
Kakurin-ji
Sosayakujin-Hachiman	Hiokayama Park
Hiokiyama Jinja
Yamato Yashiki department store
- Flag Emblem

- Location in Japan
- Coordinates: 34°45′N 134°50′E
- Country: Japan
- Region: Kansai
- Prefecture: Hyōgo

Government
  - Mayor: Yasuhiro Okada

Area
  - Total: 138.48 km^{2} (53.47 sq mi)

Population (June 1, 2024)
  - Total: 255,523
  - Density: 1,845.2/km^{2} (4,779.0/sq mi)
- Time zone: UTC+09:00 (JST)
- City hall address: 2000 Kakogawachō Kitazaike, Kakogawa-shi Hyōgo-ken 675-8501
- Website: Official website
- Symbols
- Flower: Azalea
- Tree: Japanese Black Pine

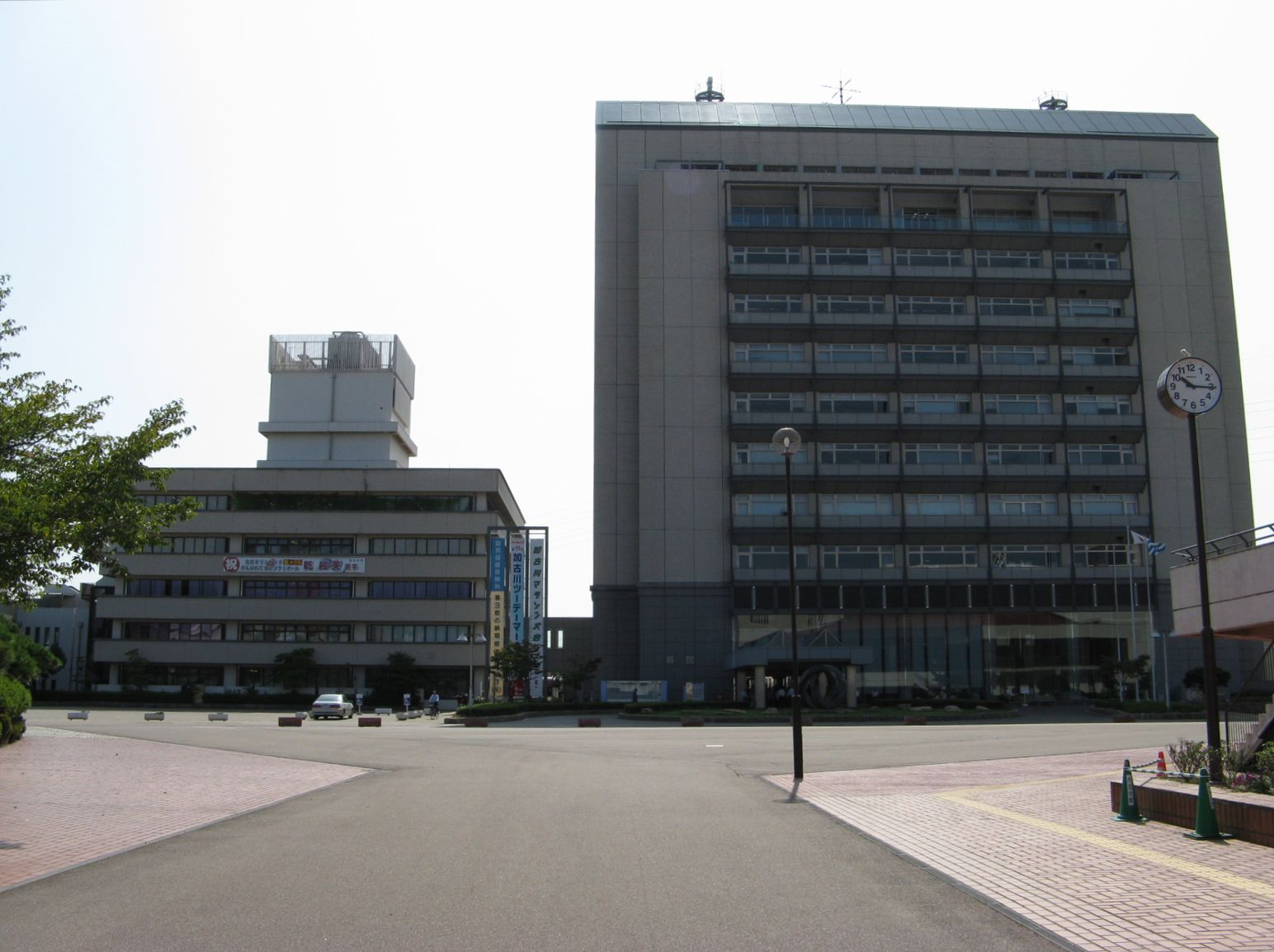
Kakogawa City Hall

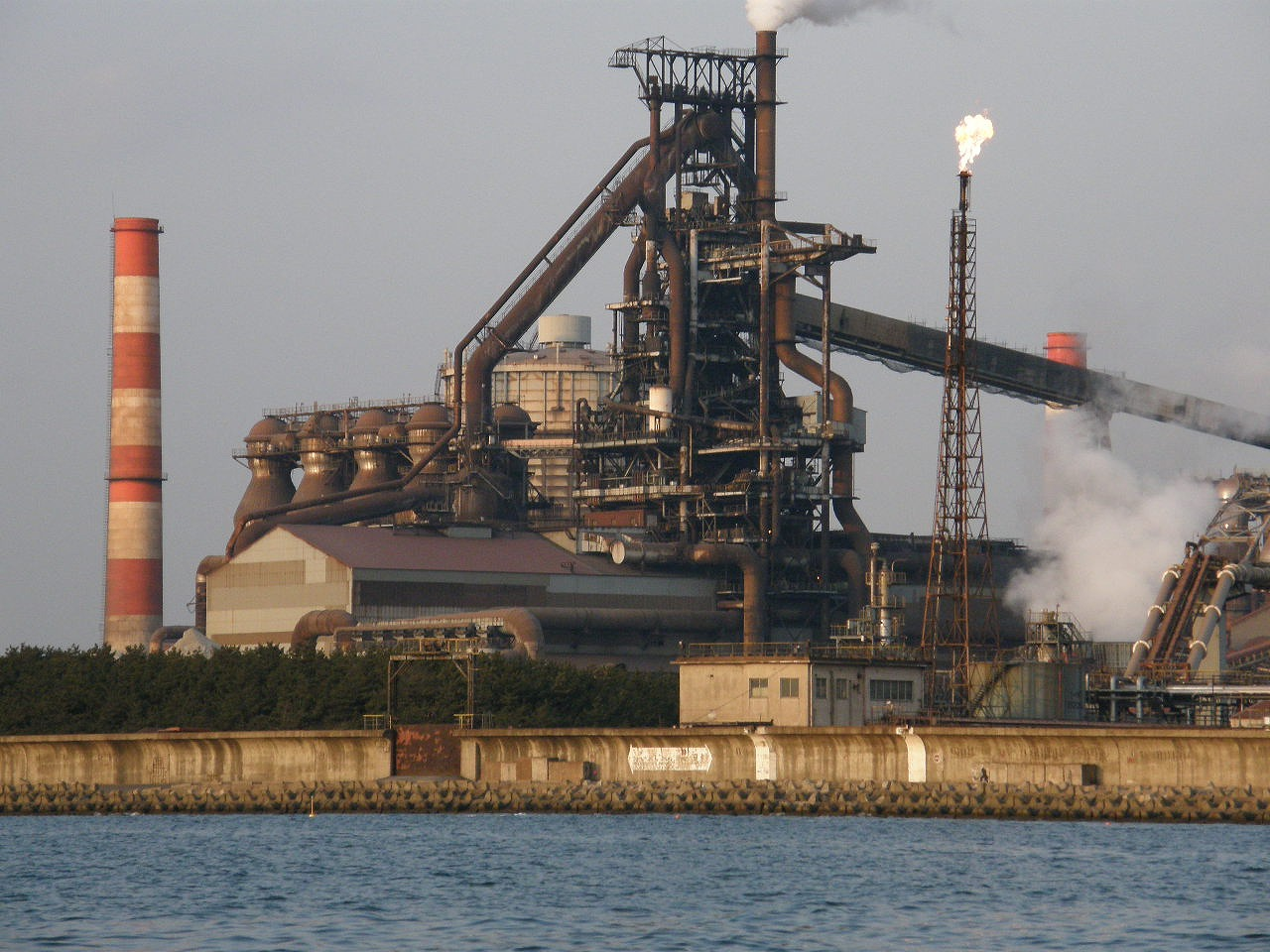
Kobe Steel Kakogawa Works

Kakogawa (加古川市, Kakogawa-shi) is a city located in Hyōgo Prefecture, Japan. As of 1 June 2024, the city had an estimated population of 255,523 in 110,380 households and a population density of 1,800 persons per km^{2}. The total area of the city is 138.48 square kilometres (53.47 sq mi).

== Geography ==
Kakogawa located in southern Hyōgo prefecture, in the eastern part of the Harima Plain with central city area spreading over the east bank of the Kako River estuary. A large portion of city is reclaimed land from the Seto Inland Sea and is mostly devoted to heavy industry. There is a completely different landscape between the southern part of the city, which has industrial areas and large-scale mass retailers, and the northern part, which is mostly rural.

=== Neighbouring municipalities ===
Hyōgo Prefecture

- Akashi
- Takasago
- Harima
- Himeji
- Inami
- Kasai
- Miki
- Ono

=== Climate ===
Kakogawa has a humid subtropical climate (Köppen Cfa) characterized by warm summers and cool winters with light to no snowfall. The average annual temperature in Kakogawa is 15.4 °C. The average annual rainfall is 1527 mm with September as the wettest month. The temperatures are highest on average in August, at around 26.5 °C, and lowest in January, at around 4.9 °C.

== Demographics ==
Per Japanese census data, the population of Kakogawa rose rapidly in the 1970s and 1980s and has now leveled.

Historical population
Year	Pop.	±%
1970	140,344	—
1975	183,280	+30.6%
1980	212,233	+15.8%
1985	227,311	+7.1%
1990	239,803	+5.5%
1995	260,567	+8.7%
2000	266,170	+2.2%
2005	267,100	+0.3%
2010	266,889	−0.1%
2015	267,435	+0.2%
2020	260,878	−2.5%

== History ==
The area of Kakogawa is part of ancient Harima Province and is the location of numerous Kofun period burial mounds. During the Sengoku period it developed as a castle town and in the Edo Period as a post station on the San'yōdō highway connecting the Kinai region with western Japan. The town of Kakogawa was established on April 1, 1889, with the creation of the modern municipalities system. It was raised to city status on June 15, 1950. Kakogawa became a Special city on April 1, 2002, with increased local autonomy.

== Government ==
Kakogawa has a mayor-council form of government with a directly elected mayor and a unicameral city council of 31 members. Kakogawa contributes four members to the Hyogo Prefectural Assembly. In terms of national politics, the city is part of Hyōgo 10th district of the lower house of the Diet of Japan.

== Economy ==
Kakogawa is located within the Hanshin Industrial Area and Harima Seaside Industrial Area and is a center for heavy industry, including steel mills, refineries and chemical processing. Kobe Steel's Kakogawa Steel Works is a major employer. Due to its transportation connections and location, with easy access to Himeji (about 10 minutes), Kobe (about 30 minutes) and Osaka (about 50 minutes) by train, numerous bedroom communities have developed for commuters to Kobe and Osaka.

== Education ==
Kakogawa has 26 public elementary schools and 11 public middle schools and one public compulsory education middle school operated by the city government and six public high schools operated by the Hyōgo Prefectural Department of Education. Hyogo University is located in Kakogawa. The city also operates one special education school for the handicapped. The nursing school of University of Hyogo is located in Akashi.

- Hyogo Agricultural College (1951)

== Transportation ==
=== Railway ===
JR West – San'yō Main Line (JR Kobe Line)

- Higashi-Kakogawa - Kakogawa

JR West – Kakogawa Line

- Kakogawa - Hioka - Kanno - Yakujin

Sanyo Electric Railway - Main Line

- Befu - Hamanomiya - Onoenomatsu

=== Highways ===
- San'yō Expressway
- National Route 2 (Kobe, Okayama, Hiroshima, Shimonoseki)
- National Route 250 (Kobe, Okayama)

== Local attractions ==
- Kakurin-ji - Buddhist temple with Taishidō completed in 1112, and Main Hall in 1397. Both are National Treasures of Japan.
- Saijō Kofun Cluster, National Historic Site

=== Special dishes ===
Katsumeshi is a specialty of Kakogawa. The dish is essentially a beef cutlet served on top of plate of rice with demi-glace sauce.

== Notable people from Kakogawa ==
- Kōhei Funae, Japanese professional shogi player ranked 6-dan
- Juri Hara, Japanese professional baseball player (pitcher, Tokyo Yakult Swallows)
- Shigetoshi Hasegawa, Japanese former relief pitcher in Major League Baseball, best-selling author and television personality
- Shinsaku Himeda, Japanese cinematographer.
- Noizi Ito, Japanese light novel and video game artist (Shakugan no Shana)
- Tomonori Jinnai, Japanese comedian, tarento, and presenter
- Hiromitsu Kanki, Japanese former professional shogi player who achieved the rank of 7-dan
- Toshiaki Kubo, Japanese professional shogi player ranked 9-dan
- Toshiaki Nishioka, Japanese former professional boxer
- Tomomi Ogawa, musician
- Megumi Ōji, Japanese actress
- Sachi Tainaka, Japanese singer and J-pop idol
- Kozo Takase, Japanese announcer and news anchor
- Masaya Takatsuka, Japanese voice actor
- Juri Ueno, Japanese actress
