= Frisak =

Frisak is a surname. Notable people with the surname include:

- Aasmund Frisak (1852–1935), Norwegian naval officer
- Nina Frisak (born 1950), Norwegian judge
- Henrik Leganger Frisak (1852–1939), Norwegian judge
