= Harald Bredo Sollie =

Norwegian jurist, naval officer and politician

Harald Bredo Sollie (17 January 1871 – 1 March 1947) was a Norwegian jurist, naval officer and politician for the Conservative Party.

== Family ==
Sollie was born in Horten to Hans Paulsen Sollie (1816–1900) and Bredine Andrea Løes (1833–1919). He had one daughter, Bergljot Sollie (1903–1994), with Marie Louise Nygaard (1875–1945). Bergljot Sollie married naval officer Thore Horve in 1927. Sollie was also the uncle of politician Hans Johan Sollie.

== Education ==
Sollie finished his secondary education in 1891. He graduated from university with the cand.jur. degree in 1895.

== Career ==
Sollie worked various jobs in Horten as a teenager. In 1892, he became a reserve officer in the Norwegian Army. He was a deputy judge from 1896 to 1898, then became a law firm partner in 1899. At the same time, he continued his naval career, advancing to premier lieutenant in 1900 and to captain in 1903. From 1913 to 1923, he was an attorney in the Royal Norwegian Navy. From 1924 to 1925, he was a legal consultant. From 1925 to 1935, he headed the quartermaster corps of the Royal Norwegian Navy, with the rank of commander.

In politics, Sollie was a member of the municipal council of Horten Municipality from 1907 to 1910 and again from 1925 to 1934. He served two non-consecutive terms in the Parliament of Norway: from 1919 to 1921 for the constituency of Horten and from 1925 to 1927 for the Market towns of Vestfold county. He was a member of the Standing Committee on Military Affairs during both terms. He was also a board member of the local bank Horten og Omegns Privatbank from 1903 to 1939.
