= Horten Municipality =

Municipality in Vestfold, Norway

Horten Municipality Horten kommune
- Municipality
- Borre kommune (historic name)
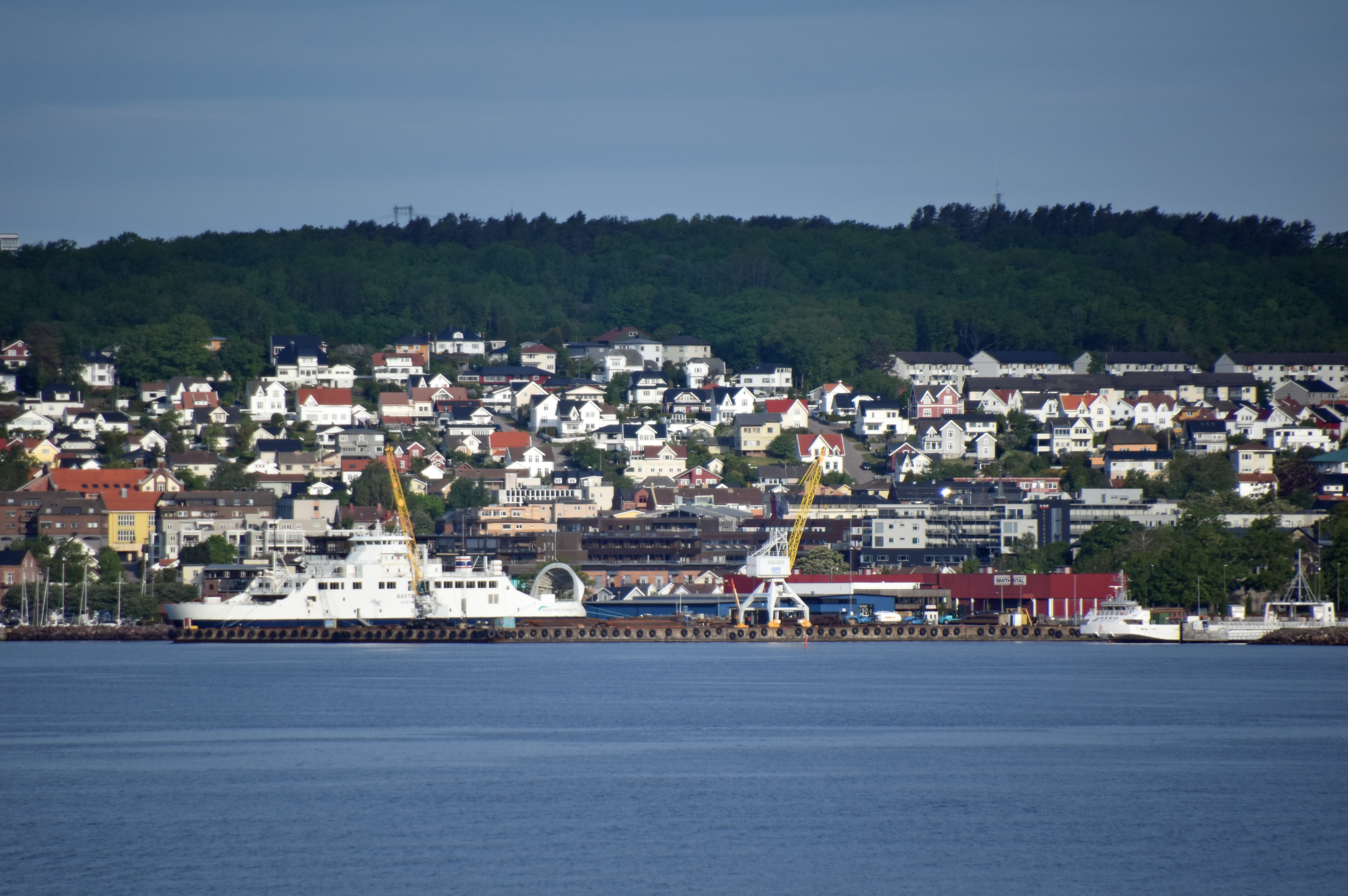
- View of the coastline of Horten

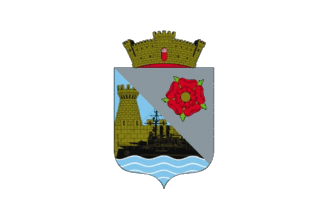
- Flag Coat of arms

- Vestfold within Norway

- Horten within Vestfold
- Coordinates: 59°25′15″N 10°25′58″E
- Country: Norway
- County: Vestfold
- District: Jarlsberg
- Established: 1 Jan 1858
  - Preceded by: Borre Municipality
- Administrative centre: Horten

Government
  - Mayor (2023): Christina Maria Bratli (Ap)

Area
  - Total: 70.96 km^{2} (27.40 sq mi)
  - Land: 69.11 km^{2} (26.68 sq mi)
  - Water: 1.85 km^{2} (0.71 sq mi) 2.6%
  - Rank: #341 in Norway
- Highest elevation (Kjærranåsen): 157.54 m (516.9 ft)

Population (2026)
  - Total: 28,173
  - Rank: #43 in Norway
  - Density: 407.7/km^{2} (1,056/sq mi)
  - Change (10 years): ▲ +3.7%
- Demonym(s): Hortenser; Hortensar

Official language
  - Norwegian form: Bokmål
- Time zone: UTC+01:00 (CET)
  - Summer (DST): UTC+02:00 (CEST)
- ISO 3166 code: NO-3901
- Website: Official website

Horten (Norwegian pronunciation: [ˈhɔʈn̩]; locally [ˈhɔʈːə]) is a municipality in Vestfold county, Norway. It is located in the traditional district of Jarlsberg. The administrative centre of the municipality is the town of Horten. Other population centers in Horten Municipality include the town of Åsgårdstrand and the villages of Nykirke, Skoppum, and Borre. The municipality is located on a peninsula along the Ytre Oslofjord.

The 70.96-square-kilometre (27.40 sq mi) municipality is the 341st largest by area out of the 357 municipalities in Norway. Horten Municipality is the 43rd most populous municipality in Norway with a population of 28,173. The municipality's population density is 407.7 inhabitants per square kilometre (1,056/sq mi) and its population has increased by 3.7% over the previous 10-year period.

Borre National Park contains the largest known burial site in Scandinavia. It also has the largest collection of king's graves in Scandinavia.

The local newspaper in Horten is named Gjengangeren, and covers mostly local news. The Bastøy Prison is located in the municipality on the island of Bastøy which is located about 3 kilometres (1.9 mi) offshore in the Ytre Oslofjord.

== General information ==
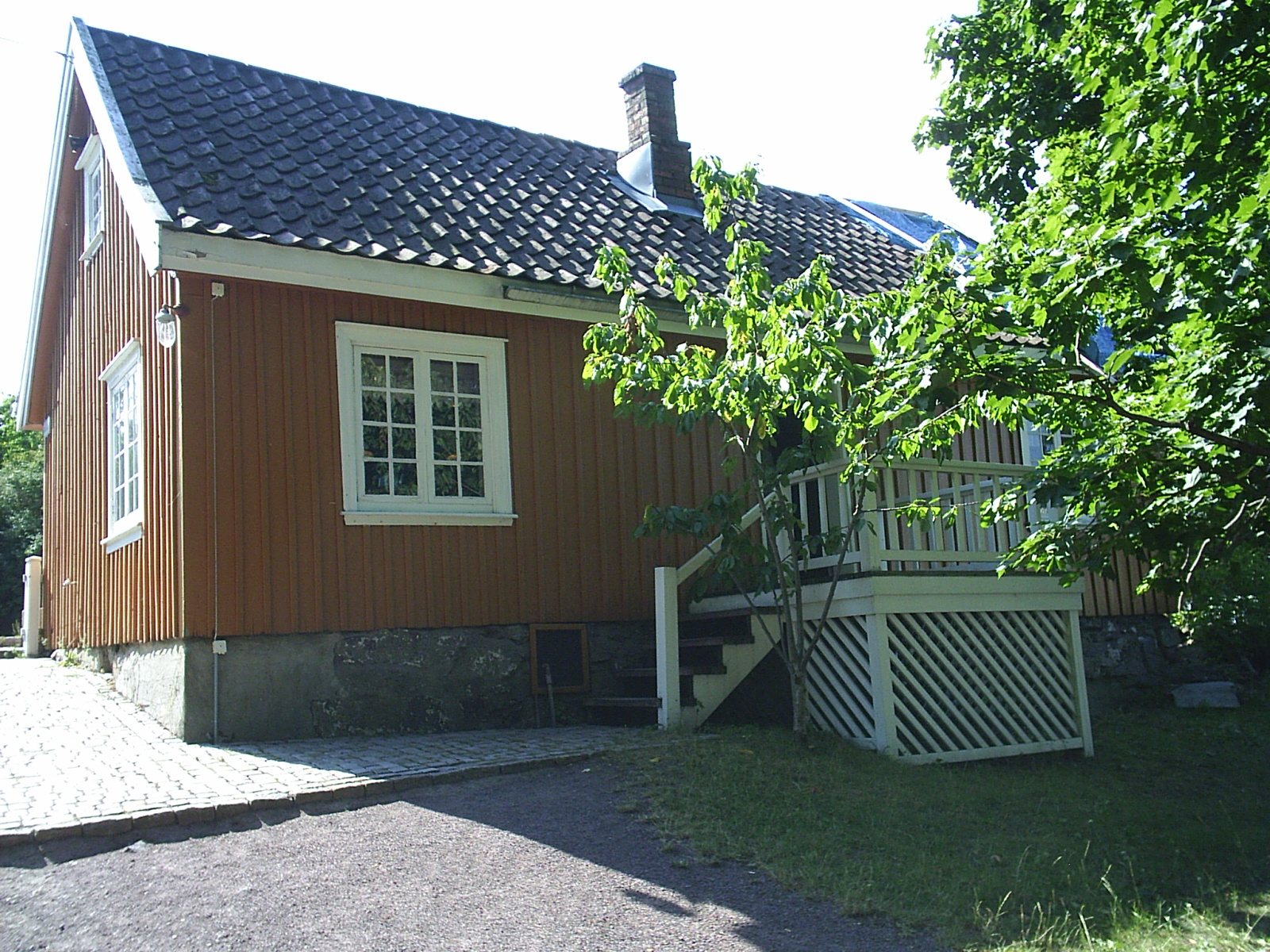
Edvard Munch's house in Åsgårdstrand

=== Administrative history ===
The formannskapsdistrikt law of 1837 created a system of local government in Norway by establishing each town (ladested or kjøpstad) and each Church of Norway prestegjeld as a civil municipality. On 28 September 1857, the small port village of Horten was designated as a ladested which meant it had to become a separate municipality. On 1 January 1858, the ladested of Horten was established as Horten Municipality. Initially, it had a population of 4,636.

On 1 August 1921, an area of Borre Municipality (population: 287) was transferred into Horten Municipality. On 1 July 1951, another area of Borre Municipality (population: 308) was transferred into Horten Municipality. On 1 January 1986, the eastern Skavli area of Borre Municipality (population: 22) was transferred into Horten Municipality.

On 1 January 1988, Borre Municipality (population: 9,098) was dissolved and merged with Horten Municipality (population: 12,994) to form a new, larger municipality named Borre (the name of this new municipality was later changed to Horten Municipality). Prior to the merger, Horten Municipality was the same as the town of Horten, but afterwards, the municipality was much larger than the town. The name of the new municipality was somewhat controversial and the government chose Borre over Horten for the new name. On 1 June 2002, the name of the municipality was changed (back) to Horten, following a referendum held in conjunction with the 2001 parliamentary election. The referendum was a close call with 6,557 votes for the name Horten and 6,218 votes for Borre.

In 2020, there were many municipal and county mergers across Norway due to the work of the Solberg cabinet. Historically, this municipality was part of Vestfold county. On 1 January 2020, the municipality became a part of the newly-formed Vestfold og Telemark county (after Telemark and Vestfold counties were merged). The merger was shortlived, and on 1 January 2024, the merger was undone and this municipality became part of Vestfold county once again.

=== Name ===
The municipality (originally the town) is named after the old Horten farm (spelled "Hortan" in 1552) since the town was built on the old farm site. The name has an uncertain meaning. The name may come from a local dialect word hort which means the "outer, knotty bark on older trees" which likely derives from the Old Norse word hǫrtr which means "something uneven" or "wrinkled". Another option could be that it is derived from the Old Norse word hǫlkn or helkn which means "rocky ground", "shelter", or "place of refuge". yet another option is that it could be the definite form of hort which can mean "bulge" (Old Norse: hǫrti). Several hills and mountains in Norway have the name Horten or Horta and here it could be referring to the Brårudåsen hill lying in the middle of the town.

From 1 January 1858 until 1 January 1988, the name was Horten Municipality. From 1 January 1988 until 1 June 2002, the name was Borre Municipality. Since 1 June 2002, the name has been Horten Municipality.

=== Coat of arms ===
The coat of arms was granted on 19 November 1907, just after Horten was designated as a kjøpstad, giving it town privileges. The blazon is "Per bend azure a fortress and boat on water and argent a rose". This means the arms are divided with a diagonal line. The field (background) below the line shows a naval fort with a boat on the water. Above the line, there is a red rose and the field has a tincture of argent which means it is commonly colored white, but if it is made out of metal, then silver is used. The arms use the old "English"-style of shield with a mural crown sits on top signifying that the municipality contains a city. The design shows the importance of the Karljohansvern naval base and the gardens of the city. The arms were designed by Andreas Bloch. The municipal flag is white with the coat of arms in the centre.

=== Churches ===
The Church of Norway has four parishes (sokn) within Horten Municipality. It is part of the Nord-Jarlsberg prosti (deanery) in the Diocese of Tunsberg.

Churches in Horten Municipality
Parish (sokn)	Church name	Location of the church	Year built
Borre	Borre Church	Borre	c. 1100
Borre	Skoppum Church	Skoppum	1989
Horten	Horten Church	Horten	1855
Horten	Løvøy Chapel	Løvøya	c. 1200
Horten	Sentrum Church	Horten	1972
Nykirke	Nykirke Church	Nykirke	c. 1100
Åsgårdstrand	Åsgårdstrand Church	Åsgårdstrand	1969

== Geography ==
Horten Municipality is located on the western shore of the Ytre Oslofjord in Vestfold County. It borders Tønsberg Municipality to the south and west, Holmestrand Municipality to the north, and Moss Municipality to the east (across the Ytre Oslofjord in Østfold county). Other nearby towns include Tønsberg to the south, the much smaller Holmestrand to the north, and Moss to the east across the fjord. About half of the municipality's total area is made up of forests, while slightly less than a third is agricultural land. The administrative centre of the municipality is the town of Horten, along the coast. The smaller town of Åsgårdstrand is located in the southern part of the municipality, along the coast. The inland villages of Skoppum, Borre, and Nykirke are all located in the rural areas of the municipality. The highest point in the municipality is the 157.54-metre (516.9 ft) tall mountain Kjærranåsen in the western part of the municipality.

=== Nature preserves ===
Nature preserves include Vealøs, Adalstjern, Frebergsvik, and Falkensten. Additional nature preserves are found by the lake Borrevannet and the islands of Løvøya and Bastøy. There is a preserve in Åsgårdstrand as well. Falkenstendammen is a wildlife preserve, home to various nationally threatened species. Reverompa Plant Reserve was established in 2006 due to presence of the nationally endangered crested cow-wheat. Tordenskjoldeika is a protected 700-year-old oak tree by the harbor. Borre National Park is located along the coast, but this is primarily a historic park.

== Government ==
Horten Municipality is responsible for primary education (through 10th grade), outpatient health services, senior citizen services, welfare and other social services, zoning, economic development, and municipal roads and utilities. The municipality is governed by a municipal council of directly elected representatives. The mayor is indirectly elected by a vote of the municipal council. The municipality is under the jurisdiction of the Vestfold District Court and the Agder Court of Appeal.

=== Municipal council ===
The municipal council (Kommunestyre) of Horten Municipality is made up of 41 representatives that are elected to four-year terms. The tables below show the current and historical composition of the council by political party.

Horten kommunestyre 2023–2027
Party name (in Norwegian)	Number of representatives
Labour Party (Arbeiderpartiet)	13
Progress Party (Fremskrittspartiet)	5
Green Party (Miljøpartiet De Grønne)	2
Conservative Party (Høyre)	10
Industry and Business Party (Industri‑ og Næringspartiet)	3
Christian Democratic Party (Kristelig Folkeparti)	1
Red Party (Rødt)	3
Socialist Left Party (Sosialistisk Venstreparti)	2
Liberal Party (Venstre)	2
Total number of members:	41

Horten kommunestyre 2019–2023
Party name (in Norwegian)	Number of representatives
Labour Party (Arbeiderpartiet)	18
Progress Party (Fremskrittspartiet)	3
Green Party (Miljøpartiet De Grønne)	3
Conservative Party (Høyre)	9
Christian Democratic Party (Kristelig Folkeparti)	1
Red Party (Rødt)	3
Centre Party (Senterpartiet)	2
Socialist Left Party (Sosialistisk Venstreparti)	1
Liberal Party (Venstre)	1
Total number of members:	41

Horten kommunestyre 2015–2019
Party name (in Norwegian)	Number of representatives
Labour Party (Arbeiderpartiet)	15
Progress Party (Fremskrittspartiet)	4
Green Party (Miljøpartiet De Grønne)	2
Conservative Party (Høyre)	11
Christian Democratic Party (Kristelig Folkeparti)	1
Red Party (Rødt)	2
Centre Party (Senterpartiet)	2
Socialist Left Party (Sosialistisk Venstreparti)	2
Liberal Party (Venstre)	2
Total number of members:	41

Horten kommunestyre 2011–2015
Party name (in Norwegian)	Number of representatives
Labour Party (Arbeiderpartiet)	15
Progress Party (Fremskrittspartiet)	3
Conservative Party (Høyre)	16
Christian Democratic Party (Kristelig Folkeparti)	1
Red Party (Rødt)	2
Centre Party (Senterpartiet)	1
Socialist Left Party (Sosialistisk Venstreparti)	1
Liberal Party (Venstre)	2
Total number of members:	41

Horten kommunestyre 2007–2011
Party name (in Norwegian)	Number of representatives
Labour Party (Arbeiderpartiet)	15
Progress Party (Fremskrittspartiet)	8
Conservative Party (Høyre)	9
Christian Democratic Party (Kristelig Folkeparti)	1
Red Electoral Alliance (Rød Valgallianse)	3
Centre Party (Senterpartiet)	1
Socialist Left Party (Sosialistisk Venstreparti)	2
Liberal Party (Venstre)	1
Joint list for health and care (Fellesliste helse og omsorg)	1
Total number of members:	41

Horten kommunestyre 2003–2007
Party name (in Norwegian)	Number of representatives
Labour Party (Arbeiderpartiet)	15
Progress Party (Fremskrittspartiet)	8
Conservative Party (Høyre)	7
Christian Democratic Party (Kristelig Folkeparti)	1
Pensioners' Party (Pensjonistpartiet)	1
Red Electoral Alliance (Rød Valgallianse)	3
Centre Party (Senterpartiet)	1
Socialist Left Party (Sosialistisk Venstreparti)	5
Total number of members:	41

Borre kommunestyre 1999–2003
Party name (in Norwegian)	Number of representatives
Labour Party (Arbeiderpartiet)	11
Progress Party (Fremskrittspartiet)	5
Conservative Party (Høyre)	9
Christian Democratic Party (Kristelig Folkeparti)	2
Red Electoral Alliance (Rød Valgallianse)	3
Centre Party (Senterpartiet)	1
Socialist Left Party (Sosialistisk Venstreparti)	2
Horten Party (Hortenpartiet)	8
Total number of members:	41
Note: On 1 June 2002, the municipal name was changed from Borre to Horten.

Borre kommunestyre 1995–1999
Party name (in Norwegian)	Number of representatives
Labour Party (Arbeiderpartiet)	11
Progress Party (Fremskrittspartiet)	6
Conservative Party (Høyre)	15
Christian Democratic Party (Kristelig Folkeparti)	2
Red Electoral Alliance (Rød Valgallianse)	3
Centre Party (Senterpartiet)	2
Socialist Left Party (Sosialistisk Venstreparti)	1
Liberal Party (Venstre)	1
Total number of members:	41

Borre kommunestyre 1991–1995
Party name (in Norwegian)	Number of representatives
Labour Party (Arbeiderpartiet)	15
Progress Party (Fremskrittspartiet)	4
Conservative Party (Høyre)	18
Christian Democratic Party (Kristelig Folkeparti)	3
Red Electoral Alliance (Rød Valgallianse)	2
Centre Party (Senterpartiet)	3
Socialist Left Party (Sosialistisk Venstreparti)	7
Liberal Party (Venstre)	1
Total number of members:	53

Borre kommunestyre 1988–1991
Party name (in Norwegian)	Number of representatives
Labour Party (Arbeiderpartiet)	20
Progress Party (Fremskrittspartiet)	7
Conservative Party (Høyre)	18
Christian Democratic Party (Kristelig Folkeparti)	2
Red Electoral Alliance (Rød Valgallianse)	1
Centre Party (Senterpartiet)	1
Socialist Left Party (Sosialistisk Venstreparti)	3
Liberal Party (Venstre)	1
Total number of members:	53
Note: On 1 January 1988, Borre Municipality merged with Horten Municipality and the name of the new municpiality was changed to Borre Municipality.

Horten bystyre 1983–1987
Party name (in Norwegian)	Number of representatives
Labour Party (Arbeiderpartiet)	23
Conservative Party (Høyre)	22
Christian Democratic Party (Kristelig Folkeparti)	2
Red Electoral Alliance (Rød Valgallianse)	2
Socialist Left Party (Sosialistisk Venstreparti)	2
Liberal Party (Venstre)	2
Total number of members:	53

Horten bystyre 1979–1983
Party name (in Norwegian)	Number of representatives
Labour Party (Arbeiderpartiet)	25
Conservative Party (Høyre)	21
Christian Democratic Party (Kristelig Folkeparti)	3
Red Electoral Alliance (Rød Valgallianse)	1
Socialist Left Party (Sosialistisk Venstreparti)	1
Liberal Party (Venstre)	2
Total number of members:	53

Horten bystyre 1975–1979
Party name (in Norwegian)	Number of representatives
Labour Party (Arbeiderpartiet)	24
Conservative Party (Høyre)	21
Christian Democratic Party (Kristelig Folkeparti)	4
Socialist Left Party (Sosialistisk Venstreparti)	2
Liberal Party (Venstre)	2
Total number of members:	53

Horten bystyre 1971–1975
Party name (in Norwegian)	Number of representatives
Labour Party (Arbeiderpartiet)	25
Conservative Party (Høyre)	17
Christian Democratic Party (Kristelig Folkeparti)	3
Socialist People's Party (Sosialistisk Folkeparti)	3
Liberal Party (Venstre)	5
Total number of members:	53

Horten bystyre 1967–1971
Party name (in Norwegian)	Number of representatives
Labour Party (Arbeiderpartiet)	26
Conservative Party (Høyre)	19
Christian Democratic Party (Kristelig Folkeparti)	2
Socialist People's Party (Sosialistisk Folkeparti)	2
Liberal Party (Venstre)	4
Total number of members:	53

Horten bystyre 1963–1967
Party name (in Norwegian)	Number of representatives
Labour Party (Arbeiderpartiet)	28
Conservative Party (Høyre)	19
Christian Democratic Party (Kristelig Folkeparti)	2
Socialist People's Party (Sosialistisk Folkeparti)	1
Liberal Party (Venstre)	3
Total number of members:	53

Horten bystyre 1959–1963
Party name (in Norwegian)	Number of representatives
Labour Party (Arbeiderpartiet)	27
Conservative Party (Høyre)	18
Communist Party (Kommunistiske Parti)	1
Christian Democratic Party (Kristelig Folkeparti)	3
Liberal Party (Venstre)	4
Total number of members:	53

Horten bystyre 1955–1959
Party name (in Norwegian)	Number of representatives
Labour Party (Arbeiderpartiet)	27
Conservative Party (Høyre)	18
Communist Party (Kommunistiske Parti)	1
Christian Democratic Party (Kristelig Folkeparti)	3
Liberal Party (Venstre)	4
Total number of members:	53

Horten bystyre 1951–1955
Party name (in Norwegian)	Number of representatives
Labour Party (Arbeiderpartiet)	26
Conservative Party (Høyre)	17
Communist Party (Kommunistiske Parti)	1
Christian Democratic Party (Kristelig Folkeparti)	4
Liberal Party (Venstre)	4
Total number of members:	52

Horten bystyre 1947–1951
Party name (in Norwegian)	Number of representatives
Labour Party (Arbeiderpartiet)	25
Conservative Party (Høyre)	18
Communist Party (Kommunistiske Parti)	2
Christian Democratic Party (Kristelig Folkeparti)	4
Liberal Party (Venstre)	3
Total number of members:	52

Horten bystyre 1945–1947
Party name (in Norwegian)	Number of representatives
Labour Party (Arbeiderpartiet)	26
Communist Party (Kommunistiske Parti)	4
Christian Democratic Party (Kristelig Folkeparti)	4
Liberal Party (Venstre)	4
Joint List(s) of Non-Socialist Parties (Borgerlige Felleslister)	14
Total number of members:	52

Horten bystyre 1937–1940*
Party name (in Norwegian)	Number of representatives
Labour Party (Arbeiderpartiet)	22
Temperance Party (Avholdspartiet)	3
Liberal Party (Venstre)	4
Joint List(s) of Non-Socialist Parties (Borgerlige Felleslister)	23
Total number of members:	52
Note: Due to the German occupation of Norway during World War II, no elections were held for new municipal councils until after the war ended in 1945.

Horten bystyre 1934–1937
Party name (in Norwegian)	Number of representatives
Labour Party (Arbeiderpartiet)	20
Temperance Party (Avholdspartiet)	5
Communist Party (Kommunistiske Parti)	1
Liberal Party (Venstre)	7
Joint List(s) of Non-Socialist Parties (Borgerlige Felleslister)	19
Total number of members:	52

Horten bystyre 1931–1934
Party name (in Norwegian)	Number of representatives
Labour Party (Arbeiderpartiet)	21
Temperance Party (Avholdspartiet)	3
Liberal Party (Venstre)	7
Joint List(s) of Non-Socialist Parties (Borgerlige Felleslister)	21
Total number of members:	52

Horten bystyre 1928–1931
Party name (in Norwegian)	Number of representatives
Labour Party (Arbeiderpartiet)	22
Temperance Party (Avholdspartiet)	5
Liberal Party (Venstre)	4
Joint list of the Conservative Party (Høyre) and the Free-minded Liberal Party (Frisinnede Venstre)	21
Total number of members:	52

Horten bystyre 1925–1928
Party name (in Norwegian)	Number of representatives
Labour Party (Arbeiderpartiet)	7
Temperance Party (Avholdspartiet)	5
Social Democratic Labour Party (Socialdemokratiske Arbeiderparti)	14
Liberal Party (Venstre)	4
Joint List(s) of Non-Socialist Parties (Borgerlige Felleslister)	22
Total number of members:	52

Horten bystyre 1922–1925
Party name (in Norwegian)	Number of representatives
Labour Party (Arbeiderpartiet)	8
Temperance Party (Avholdspartiet)	7
Social Democratic Labour Party (Socialdemokratiske Arbeiderparti)	11
Liberal Party (Venstre)	6
Joint List(s) of Non-Socialist Parties (Borgerlige Felleslister)	20
Total number of members:	52

Horten bystyre 1920–1922
Party name (in Norwegian)	Number of representatives
Labour Party (Arbeiderpartiet)	13
Temperance Party (Avholdspartiet)	5
Liberal Party (Venstre)	7
Joint List(s) of Non-Socialist Parties (Borgerlige Felleslister)	19
Total number of members:	44

=== Mayors ===
The mayor (Norwegian: ordfører) of Horten Municipality is the political leader of the municipality and the chairperson of the municipal council. The following people have held this position:

- 1858–1859: Honoratus Halling
- 1859–1865: Christian Torber Hegge Geelmuyden
- 1866–1867: Paul Lemvig Thrane
- 1868–1868: Johan Koren
- 1869–1869: Jacob Lerche Johansen
- 1870–1873: Christopher Gundersen
- 1874–1875: Einar Torkel Christian Tambeskjelver Rosenquist
- 1876–1876: Christian Torber Hegge Geelmuyden
- 1876–1876: Henrik Jakob Müller
- 1877–1877: Einar Torkel Christian Tambeskjelver Rosenquist
- 1878–1878: Christian Wilhelm Wisbech
- 1879–1879: Einar Torkel Christian Tambeskjelver Rosenquist
- 1880–1881: Christian Wilhelm Wisbech
- 1882–1889: Christian Magnus Falsen (H)
- 1890–1892: Jonas Severin Rasmussen (H)
- 1892–1893: Gabriel Cappelen Mørch (H)
- 1894–1898: Oskar Storm (V)
- 1899–1901: John Utheim (V)
- 1902–1904: Aasmund Frisak (H)
- 1905–1906: Hagbart Henriksen
- 1907–1910: Otto Georg Enger (V)
- 1910–1913: Harald Pedersen (V)
- 1914–1915: Karl Johan Knudsen (Ap)
- 1916–1916: Otto Georg Enger (V)
- 1917–1918: Karl Johan Knudsen (Ap)
- 1919–1940: Hans Johan Sollie (H)
- 1940–1941: Herman Haug (H)
- 1942–1944: Erling Winje (NS)
- 1944–1945: Vagn Knudsen (H/NS)
- 1945–1945: Hans Johan Sollie (H)
- 1945–1967: Paul Bentsen (Ap)
- 1968–1975: Ragnar Heitun (Ap)
- 1976–1977: Finn Harder Johannesen (H)
- 1978–1979: Johannes Synnes (KrF)
- 1980–1983: Ragnar Heitun (Ap)
- 1984–1985: Jørgen Hårek Kosmo (Ap)
- 1985–1987: Ove Bjørkavåg (Ap)
- 1988–1999: Jon Edvard Brække (H)
- 1999–2011: Nils Henning Hontvedt (Ap)
- 2011–2015: Børre Tommy Jacobsen (H)
- 2015–2015: Finn-Øyvind Langfjell (H)
- 2015–2023: Are Karlsen (Ap)
- 2023–2027: Christina Maria Bratli (Ap)

== Economy ==
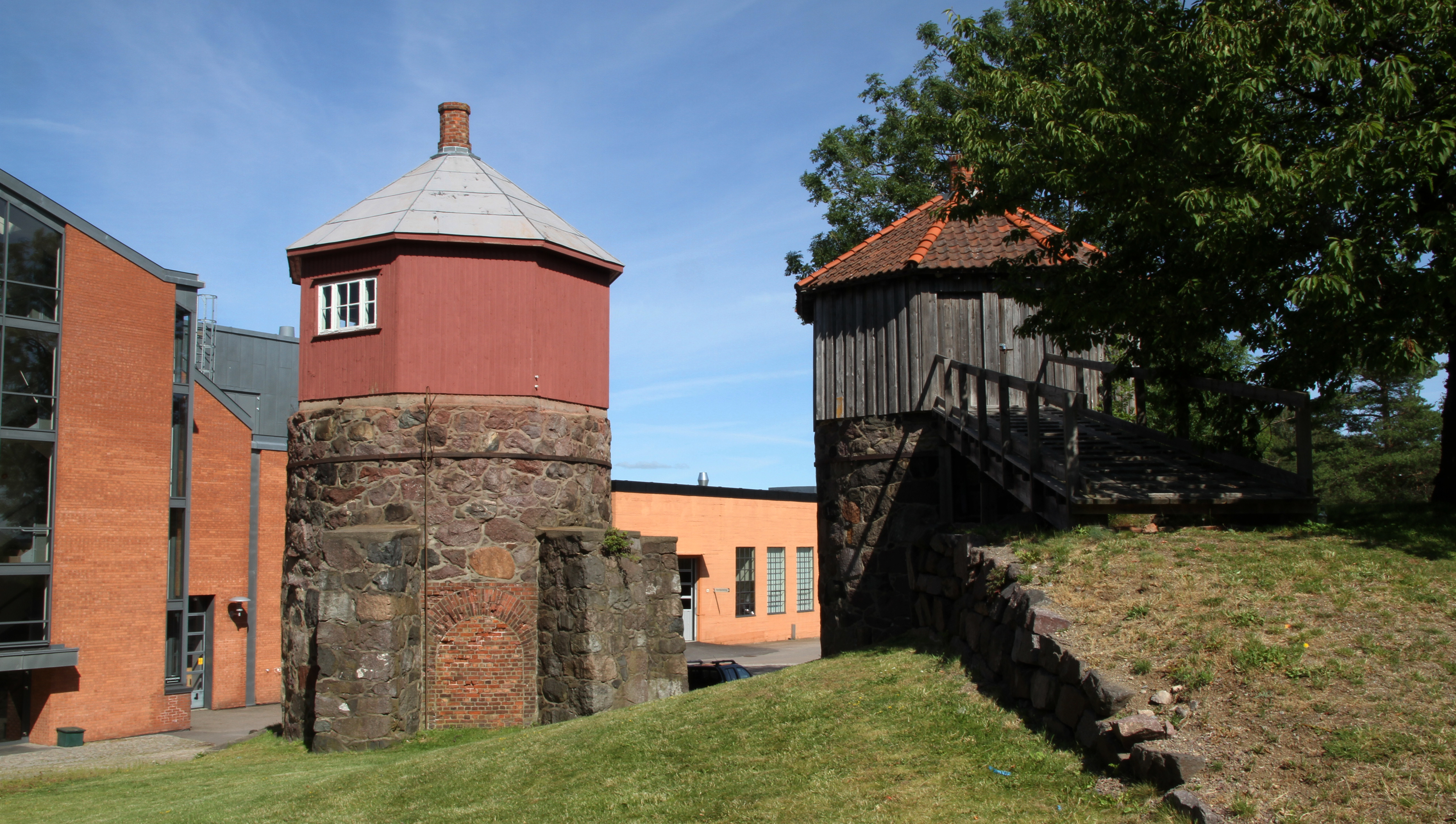
Karljohansvern was the Royal Norwegian Navy's main base from 1819 to 1963

Horten Municipality's employment sector is made up of industry (21.7% as of 2014), health and social services (18.1%), education (12.1%), and commerce and auto-repair (12.7%). The Royal Norwegian Navy was traditionally an important industry, but the city experienced an economic change when the Navy moved its main base to Bergen during the mid-20th century and Horten Verft went bankrupt in 1987. Currently, one of the most important industries is electrical engineering, represented by companies such as Kongsberg Maritime, Kongsberg Norcontrol, Simrad Horten, GE Vingmed Ultrasound, and others.

Minorities (1st and 2nd generation) in Horten by country of origin in 2017
Ancestry	Number
Poland	408
Somalia	384
Bosnia-Herzegovina	341
Lithuania	323
Denmark	166
Sweden	149
Iraq	148
Philippines	134
Afghanistan	122
Iran	116
Russia	108
Germany	105

== Culture ==
The town of Åsgårdstrand has been a vacation and bathing destination since 1920. It had already become an artists' colony by then, attracting painters such as Edvard Munch and Fritz Thaulow. Edvard Munch spent a total of seven summers at his vacation home in Åsgårdstrand, known as Munchs Lille Hus ("Munch's Little House"). The house is now a museum, located on Munch's Street (Munchsgate 25).

=== Borre mounds ===
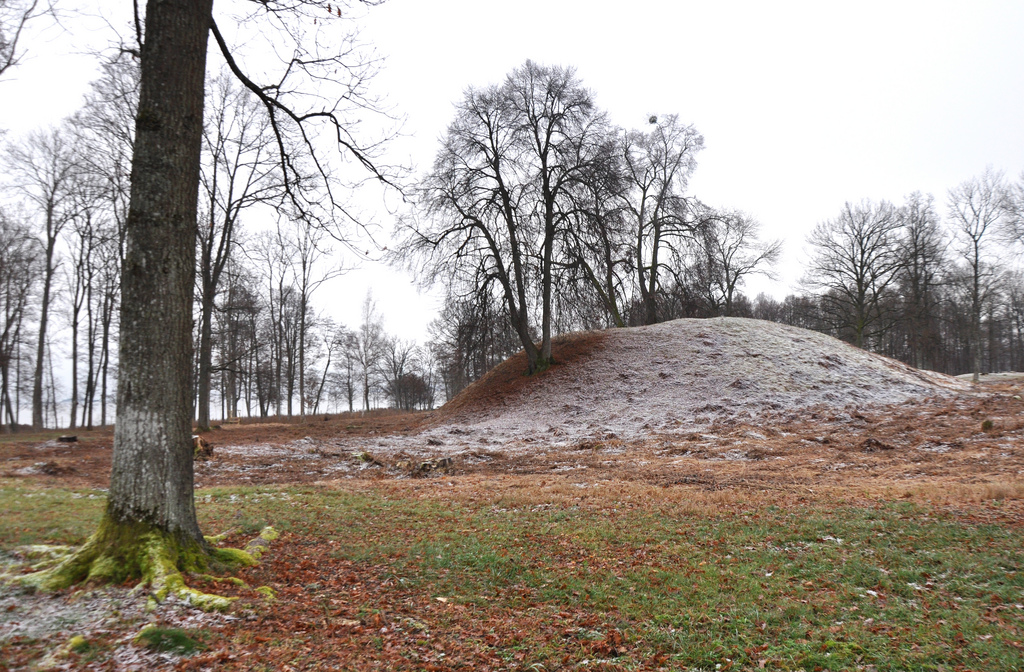
Burial mound at Borre National Park, Norway's first national park.

Borrehaugene (from Borre, the name of a local village and "haugene" from the Old Norse word haugr meaning mound) was the first national park to be founded in Norway. Borre National Park is situated between the towns of Horten and Åsgårdstrand. The park provides important historical knowledge, and can be seen as evidence that there was a center of power here in the Viking Age. The excavations also uncovered an unusually good selection of craft work, much of which is on display in Oslo at the Viking Ship Museum. This style has become known as "Borre style" and is, today, known for its animal and knot ornaments, which were often used for decorating harnesses. The finds also confirm that there was a Viking ship buried at Borrehaugene.

Borre mound cemetery at Borre National Park contains graves of kings dating back to the Migration Period. The park covers 45 acres (180,000 m^{2}) and has the largest collection of kings' graves in Scandinavia. These burial mounds may represent North Europe's most extensive collection of graves of the old Scandinavian Yngling dynasty. From 1989 to 1991, new excavations were undertaken both in and around the national park.

== Transportation ==
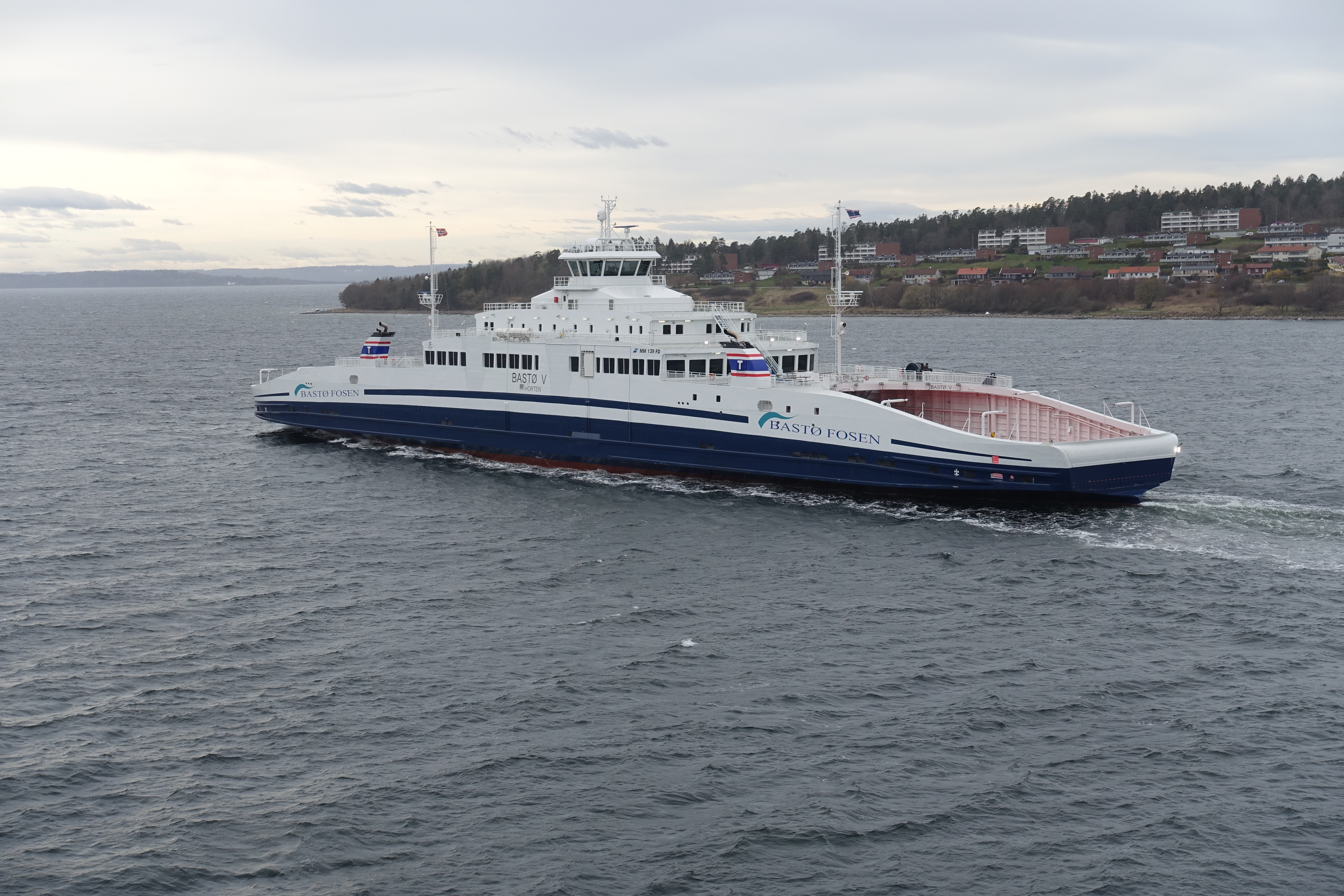
Ferries cut across the Oslo Fjord, connecting Horten and Moss.

Being located out on a peninsula, most major transportation arteries go to the west of the town of Horten and secondary roads connect the town to these routes. The Moss–Horten Ferry (also known as the Bastø Ferry) crosses the Oslofjord, connecting to the town of Moss in Østfold county. The ferry departs 1–4 times per hour, and the journey takes about 30 minutes. The ferry transports annually about 1.8 million vehicles and 3.5 million passengers.

The railway line Vestfoldbanen passes through the Horten municipality, but not through the main city center. The main train station in Horten is in the village of Skoppum. Skoppum Station is located southwest of the town centre, although many commuters prefer to use Holmestrand Station due to better road access. Skoppum is 1 hour and 10 minutes by train from Oslo Central Station. By car, Horten is reached by following European route E18 south, and is approximately 100 kilometres (62 mi) from Oslo. The nearest airport is Sandefjord Airport Torp which is located about 30 minutes by train south of Skoppum.

== Sports ==
Horten has several football clubs. The most successful and well known is FK Ørn-Horten, which currently plays in the Norwegian 2nd Division. Another Horten team, Falk, plays in the Norwegian Third Division, while Borre IF and Holtankammeratene plays further down in the leagues.

== Education ==
The University of South-Eastern Norway has a campus in Horten, commonly referred to as Bakkenteigen, which offers a wide range of subjects from sociology, history and language thru mathematics, nature science and maritime studies. Bakkenteigen has over 4,000 students and aims to be a resource for research and development in the region.

== Attractions ==
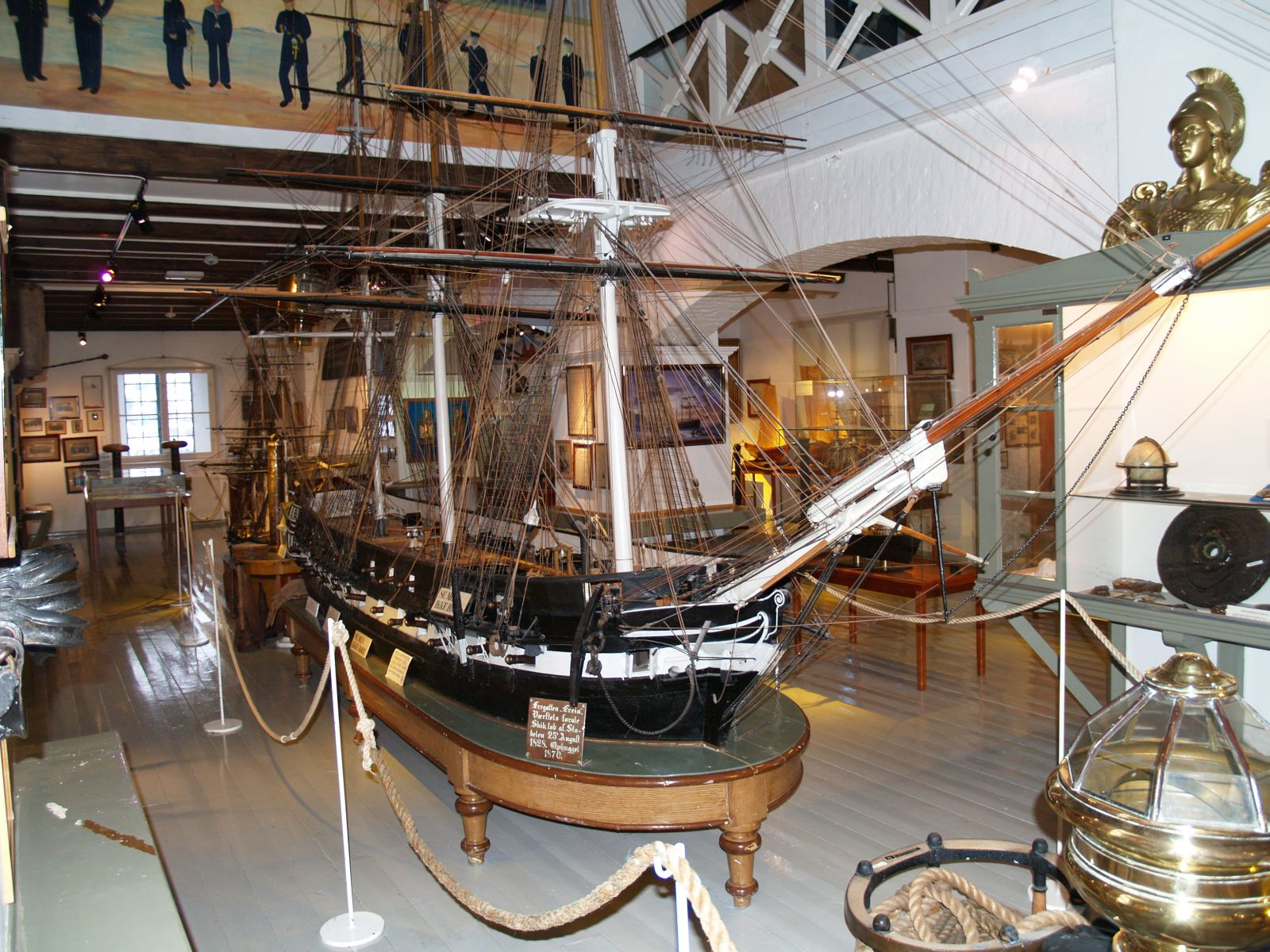
Norwegian Naval Museum

- Borre National Park, the first national park in Norway. It is home to Northern Europe's largest collection of royal grave mounds, and it is the largest grave mound site in Northern Europe.
- Royal Norwegian Navy Museum (Marinemuseet), the oldest existing museum of its kind in the world, founded in 1853. At the Royal Norwegian Navy Museum you can find many ships, including HNoMS Rap, the world's first torpedo boat from 1873.
- Preus Fotomuseum, the Norwegian Museum of Photography, is a unique museum located in the same building as the naval museum.
- Karljohansvern, the former naval base in Horten. Activity there in the recent years have been decreasing and parts of the area have now been opened to the public, including some nice beaches. Both the museum of photography and the navy museum are located close to the naval base.
- Royal Norwegian Navy Band, a military band ranked among the best in Europe has its home base in Karljohansvern in Horten.
- Borre Golfbane, a golf course has hosted two Challenge Tour events (1994 and 1998) and was in 2005 extended to 27 holes of full length (par 72 + par 36). The first Challenge Tour event in 1994 was the first professional golf tournament on Norwegian soil. The 18-hole course runs along lake Borrevannet and some of the holes have views over the lake.
- Borrevannet, a lake that is home to a national bird sanctuary where 255 different bird species have been observed (2003 numbers). 110 species have been confirmed using the lake as their nesting place.
- L'Esprit d'Edvard Munch, the northernmost vineyard of the world, operating in Horten.
- Åsgårdstrand, a town in the southern part of the municipality, is a sight of its own. It is a small, white-painted ocean town that is best known for its great painters (like the aforementioned Edvard Munch) and its beaches.

== Notable people ==
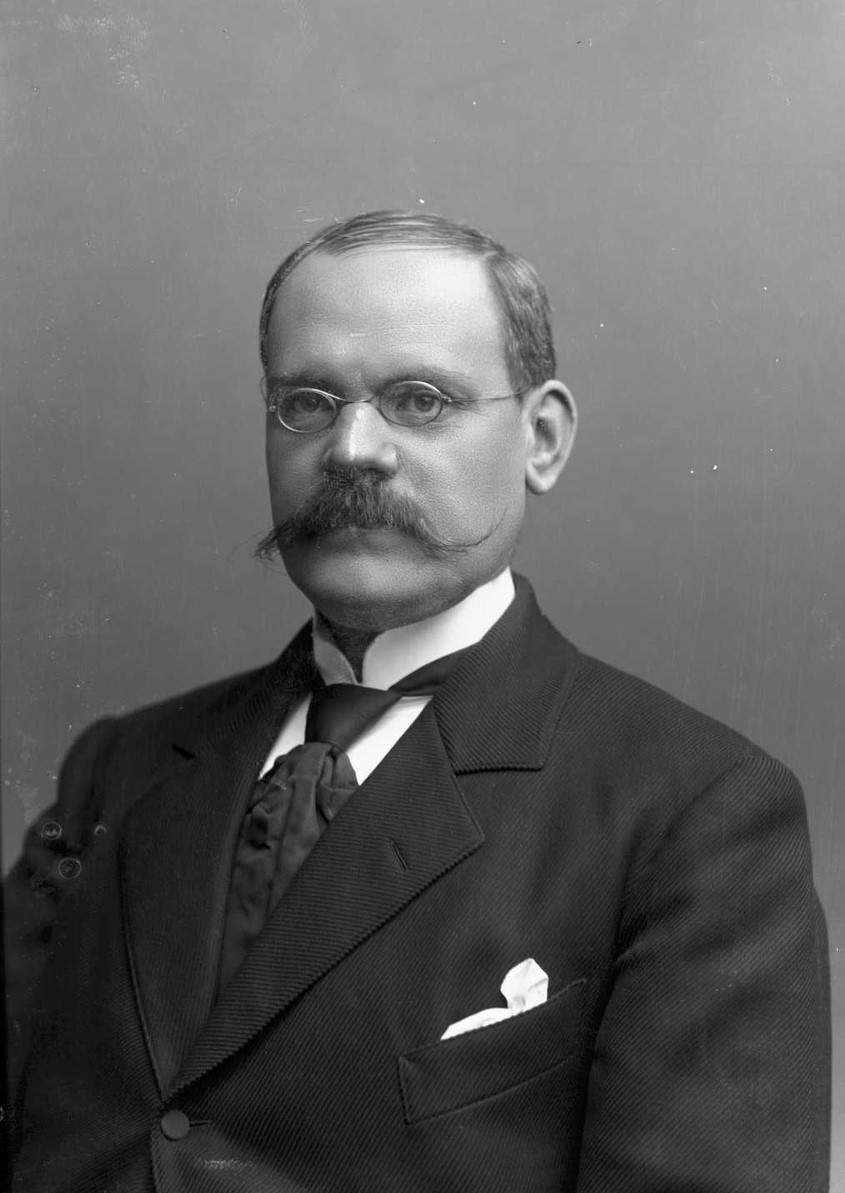
Francis Hagerup, 1895

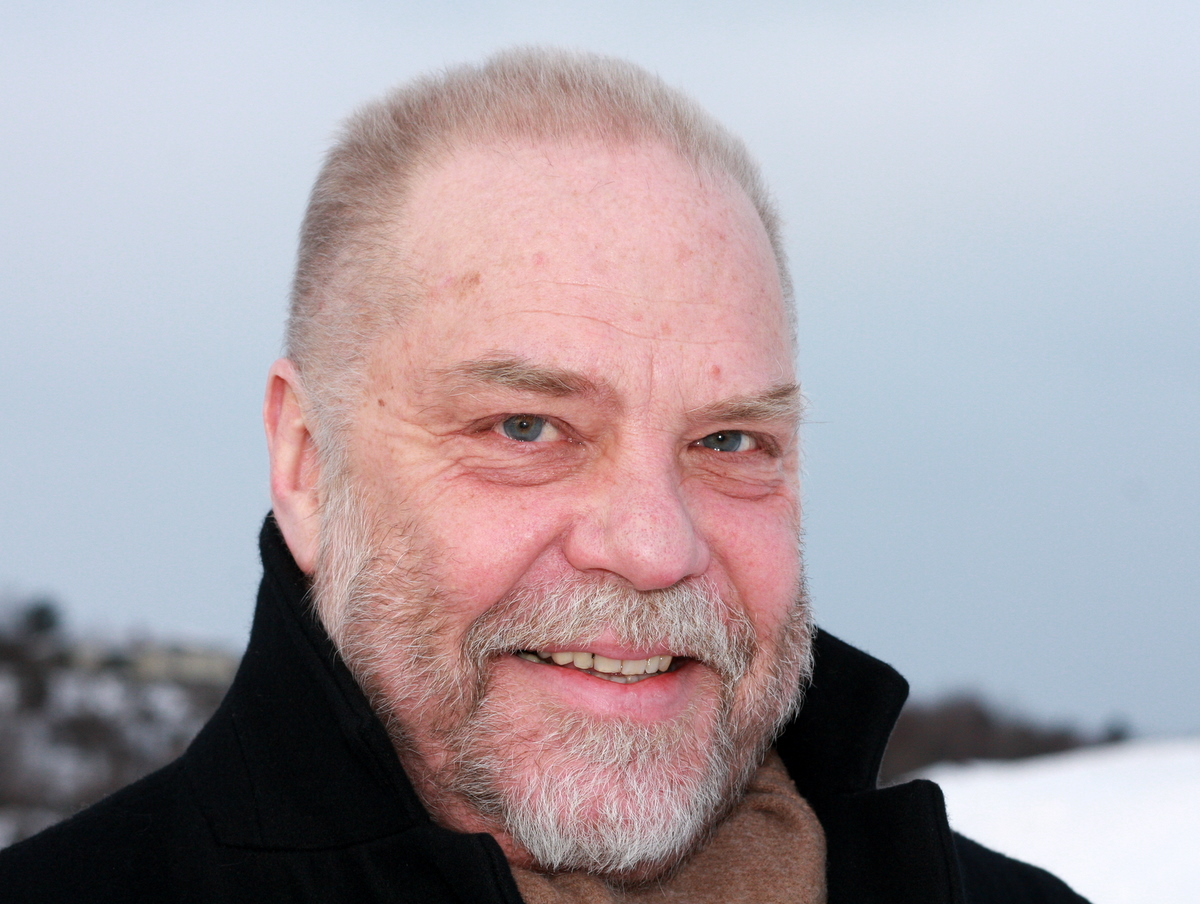
Nils Henning Hontvedt, 2010

=== Public Service ===
- Mathias Sigwardt (1770 in Borre – 1840), a priest and Bishop of Christianssand
- Christian Torber Hegge Geelmuyden (1816–1885), a naval officer and mayor of Horten from 1857-1864
- Francis Hagerup (1853–1921), a law professor, diplomat, and Prime Minister of Norway from 1895 to 1898 and from 1903 to 1905 who grew up in Horten
- Kristine Munch (1873 in Horten – 1959), an early female physician
- Thorstein H. H. Thoresen (1885 in Horten – 1956), the Lieutenant Governor of North Dakota
- Jan B. Jansen (1898 in Horton – 1984), a physician, anatomist, brain researcherin, and member of the WWII Norwegian resistance
- Finn Ronne (1899 in Horten – 1980), a U.S. citizen and Antarctic explorer
- Arne Skaug (1906 in Horten – 1974), an economist, civil servant, diplomat, and politician
- Gunnar Syverstad (1910 in Horten – 1945), a resistance fighter who assisted the Norwegian heavy water sabotage
- Grethe Rytter Hasle (1920 in Borre – 2013), a planktologist
- Arnoldus Schytte Blix (born 1946 in Borre), a zoologist and Arctic explorer
- Nils Henning Hontvedt (born 1952), a politician and mayor of Horten from 2001 to 2011

=== The Arts ===
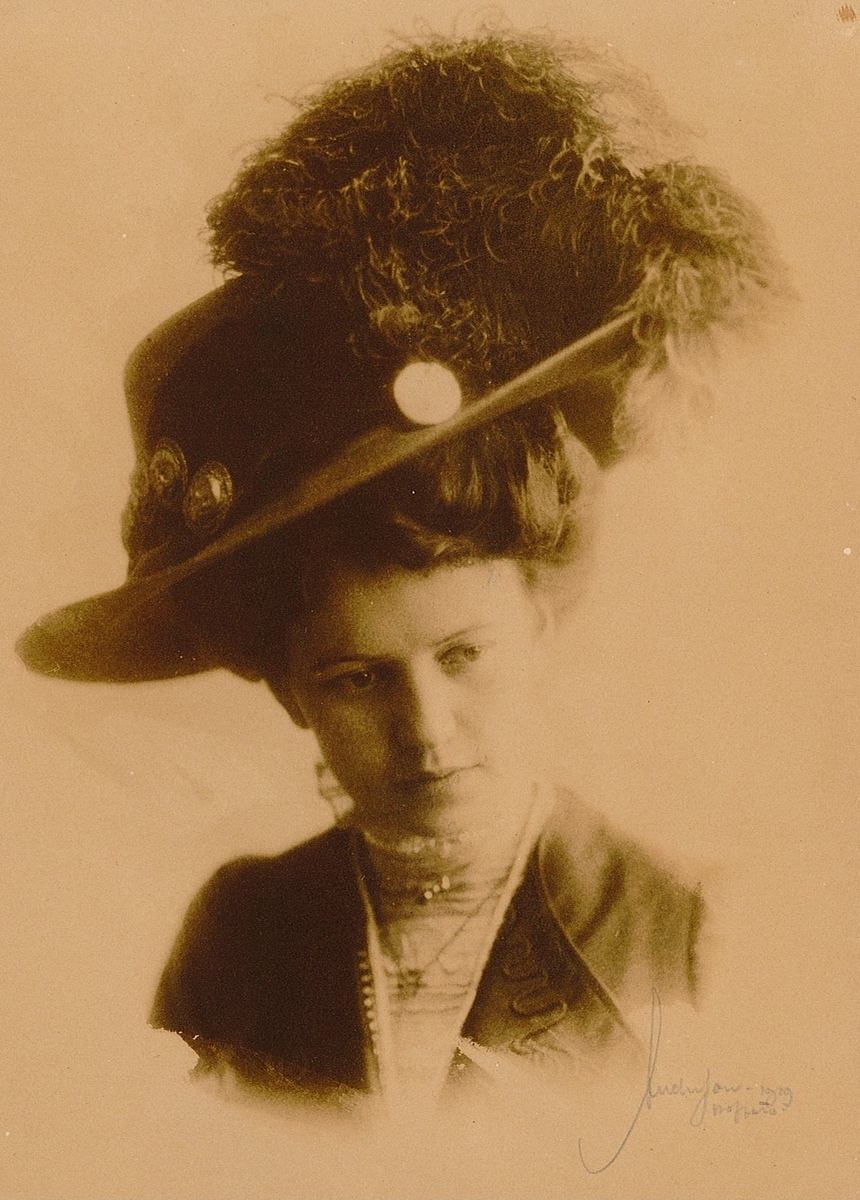
Kaja Eide Norena, 1909

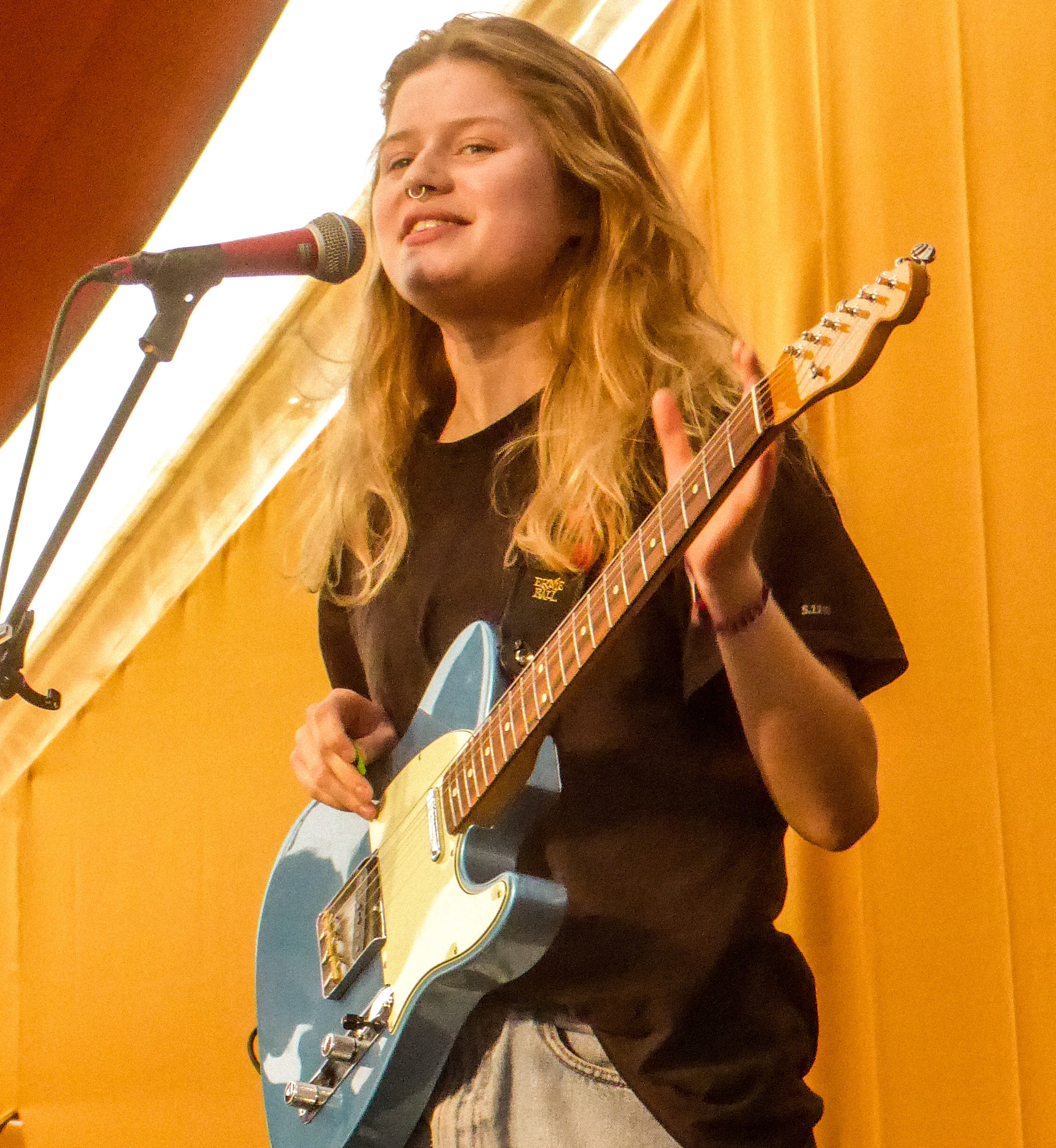
M U Ringheim, Girl in Red, 2019

- Lagertha Broch (1864 in Horten – 1952), an illustrator, children's writer, and proponent for women's rights
- William Ivarson (1867 in Horton – 1934), a theatre actor
- Eidé Norena (1884 in Horten – 1968), a soprano and actress
- Per Krohg (1889 in Åsgårdstrand – 1965), an artist of the mural for the UN Security Council
- Bjorn Egeli (1900 in Horten – 1984), an American portrait painter and maritime artist
- Paul Lorck Eidem (1909 in Horten – 1992), a writer and illustrator who grew up on Bastøy
- Astrid Hjertenæs Andersen (1915 in Horten – 1985), a poet and travel-writer
- Eva Gustavson (1917 at Oslofjord — 2009), a Norwegian-American contralto in operas
- Leif Preus (1928 in Horten – 2013), a photographer who founded the Preus Museum in 1976
- Joachim Calmeyer (1931 in Horten – 2016), an actor who grew up in Horten
- Sigurd Jansen (born 1932 in Horten), a composer, pianist, and conductor
- Vidar Lønn-Arnesen (born 1940 in Horten), a singer and radio and TV presenter
- Grethe Kausland (1947 in Horten – 2007), a singer, performer, and actress
- Geir Langslet (born 1956 in Horten), a jazz pianist and band leader
- Marie Ulven Ringheim (born 1999 in Horten) known as Girl in Red, an indie pop singer-songwriter

=== Sport ===
- Herman Smith-Johannsen (1875 in Horten – 1987), a supercentenarian skier who introduced cross-country skiing to Canada and North America
- Gil Andersen (1879 in Horten – 1930), a Norwegian-American racecar driver
- Harry Boye Karlsen (1920 in Horten – 1994), a footballer with 58 caps for Norway
- Per Bredesen (born 1930), a footballer with 276 club caps and 18 for Norway

== International relations ==
=== Twin towns — Sister cities ===
Horten Municipality has sister city agreements with the following places:

- Hillerød, Region Hovedstaden, Denmark
- Karlskrona, Blekinge County, Sweden
- Loviisa, Southern Finland, Finland
- Ólafsfjörður, Fjallabyggð, Iceland

== See also ==
- Battle of Horten Harbour
