= Hans Johan Sollie =

Norwegian politician

Hans Johan Sollie (13 June 1885 – 12 February 1973) was a Norwegian bookseller and member of parliament for the Conservative Party.

== Biography ==
He was born in Aalesund in Møre og Romsdal, Norway. He was a son of headmaster Paul Sollie (1852–1919) and Dorothea Torgersen (1860–1949). He was a nephew of politician Harald Bredo Sollie. He finished his secondary education in Fredrikshald in 1903, and set out to be a bookseller. He worked in H. Aschehoug & Co's outlet from 1903 to 1905, in Gudbrandsdalens Bokhandel briefly in 1905 and for Erik Qvist from 1905 to 1908. In 1908 he started his own book shop in Horten Municipality. He also wrote for newspapers such as Verdens Gang.

In politics, Sollie was a member of the city council of Horten Municipality from 1913 to 1919, and then served as mayor from 1919 to autumn 1945, except for the period between 1940 and spring 1945 when Norway was occupied by Nazi Germany. He served in the Parliament of Norway from 1934 to 1936 for the constituency Market towns of Vestfold county, and was a deputy representative for the next term.

Sollie was very active in local organizations. In transport he was a member of the 1928 committee that prepared the Moss–Horten Ferry, and he was a member of the supervisory committee of the Vestfold Line from 1930 to 1933. In sport he chaired the clubs Horten SK (skiing) and Horten SK (speed skating). In culture he was a board member of the local cinematographer from 1918 to 1940, and chaired it briefly in 1945; he was also a board member of Kommunale Kinematografers Landsforbund before 1940 and from 1945 to 1946. He was a board member of the newspaper Gjengangeren from 1921 to 1945, and of the local bank Horten og Omegns Privatbank. He chaired the local commerce association from 1912 to 1918. In the Union of Norwegian Cities he was a national board member from 1935, and chaired the regional branch in Vestfold from 1936 to 1940 and 1945 to 1946.
