= Bastøy Lighthouse =

Coastal lighthouse in Horten, Norway

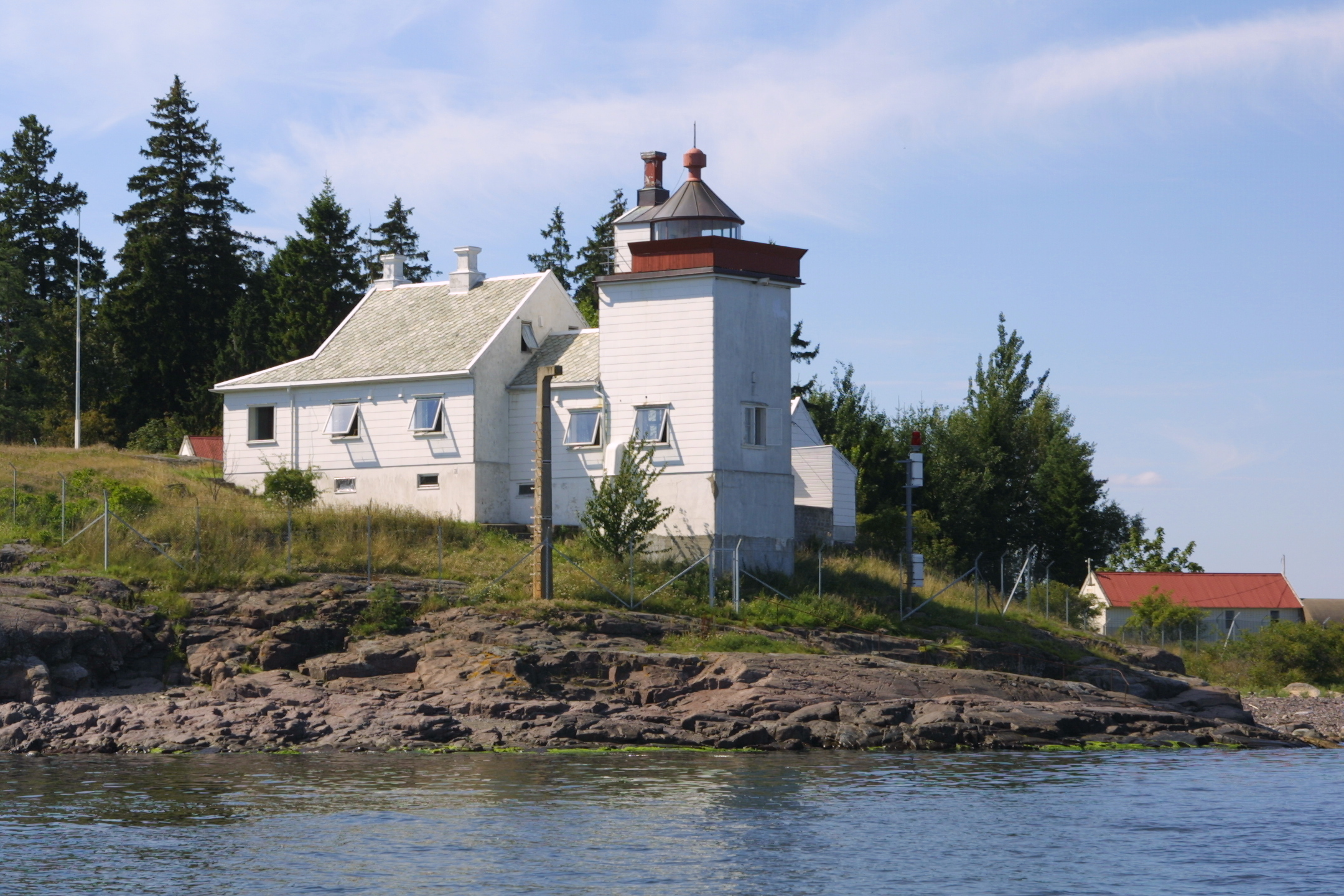
- Location: Horten, Vestfold, Norway
- Coordinates: 59.386413°N 10.537095°E

Tower
- Constructed: 1840 (first); 1918 (second)
- Construction: stone tower (second) metal pole (current)
- Automated: 1986
- Height: 14 metres (46 ft) (second)
- Shape: square tower with balcony and lantern (second) light pole (current)
- Markings: white tower, red lantern (second)
- Operator: Kriminalomsorgen

Light
- First lit: 1986 (current)
- Deactivated: 1986 (second)
- Focal height: 13 metres (43 ft) (current)
- Characteristic: Oc(3) R 10s

Bastøy Lighthouse (Norwegian: Bastøy fyr) is a coastal lighthouse in Horten Municipality in Vestfold county, Norway. It is located on the island of Bastøy in the Oslofjorden, about 4 kilometres (2.5 mi) southeast of the town of Horten. It was established in 1840 and originally consisted of a stone house with a low tower. It was replaced by an automated light in 1986.

== See also ==
- List of lighthouses in Norway
- Lighthouses in Norway
