= Horten Church =

Church in Vestfold, Norway

- Horten kirke
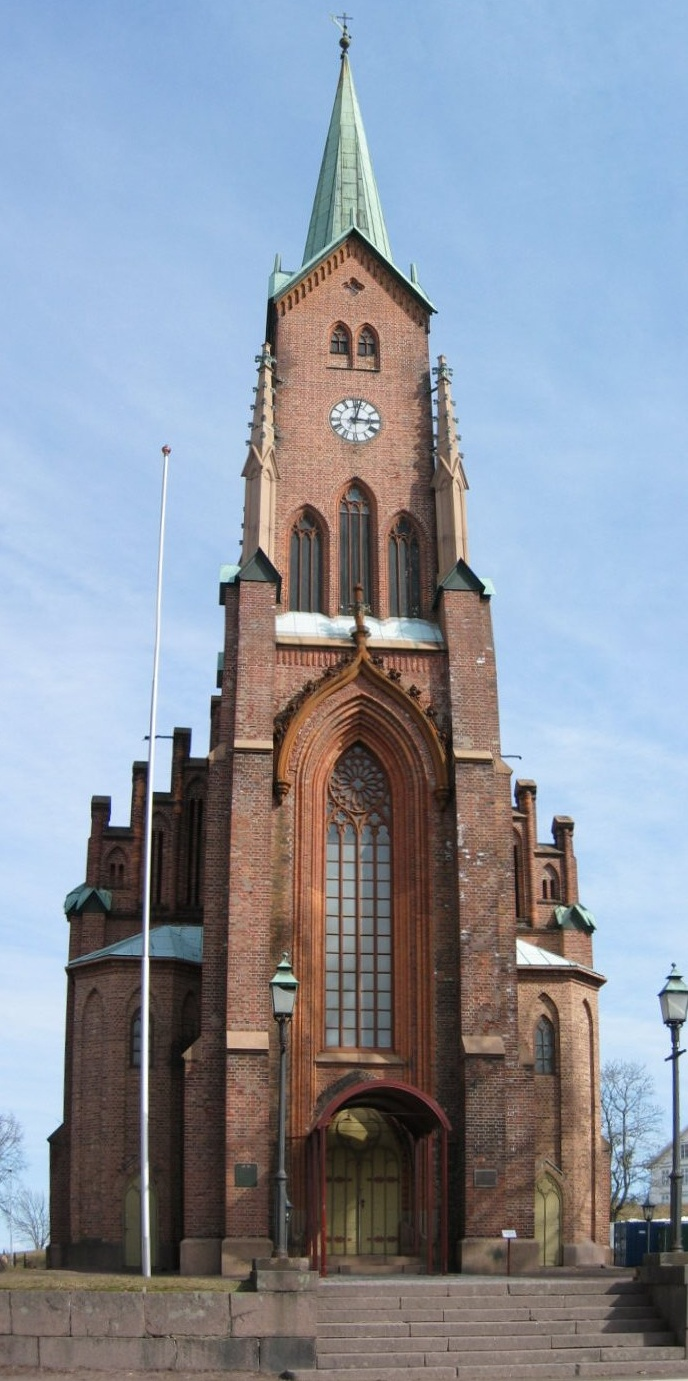
- View of the church
- Horten Church
- 59°25′37″N 10°29′25″E
- Location: Horten Municipality, Vestfold
- Country: Norway
- Denomination: Church of Norway
- Churchmanship: Evangelical Lutheran

History
- Status: Parish church
- Founded: 1855
- Consecrated: 22 Aug 1855

Architecture
- Functional status: Active
- Architect: Christian H. Grosch
- Architectural type: Long church
- Completed: 1855 (171 years ago)

Specifications
- Capacity: 750
- Materials: Brick

Administration
- Diocese: Tunsberg
- Deanery: Nord-Jarlsberg prosti
- Parish: Horten

Horten Church (Norwegian: Horten kirke) is a parish church of the Church of Norway in Horten Municipality in Vestfold county, Norway. It is located in the town of Horten. It is one of the churches for the Horten parish which is part of the Nord-Jarlsberg prosti (deanery) in the Diocese of Tunsberg. The red brick church was built in a long church design in 1855 using plans drawn up by the architect Christian Heinrich Grosch. The church seats about 750 people.

== History ==
The church was built by the Royal Norwegian Navy as a garrison church for the Karljohansvern naval station (the town of Horten grew up around the naval base). The church was designed by Christian Heinrich Grosch in 1852. Construction began in 1853 and the completed church was consecrated on 22 August 1855. Present at the consecration were both King Oscar I, Crown Prince Karl (the future king), and his brother Oscar (another future king). It is a long church constructed out of brick. If the church had transepts in front of the choir, we would have called it a three-nave basilica. The church has a west tower with stairwells on both sides. The tower can be said to consist of two parts, of which the lower one is the strongest and is supported by buttresses. There is a large lancet window over the west door. The nave has stair gables with blind niches in several levels. Originally there were 950 seats, but this has since been reduced to around 750 due to modern fire codes. If standing places are used, however, probably a thousand people walk through the doors on special occasions.

== Media gallery ==
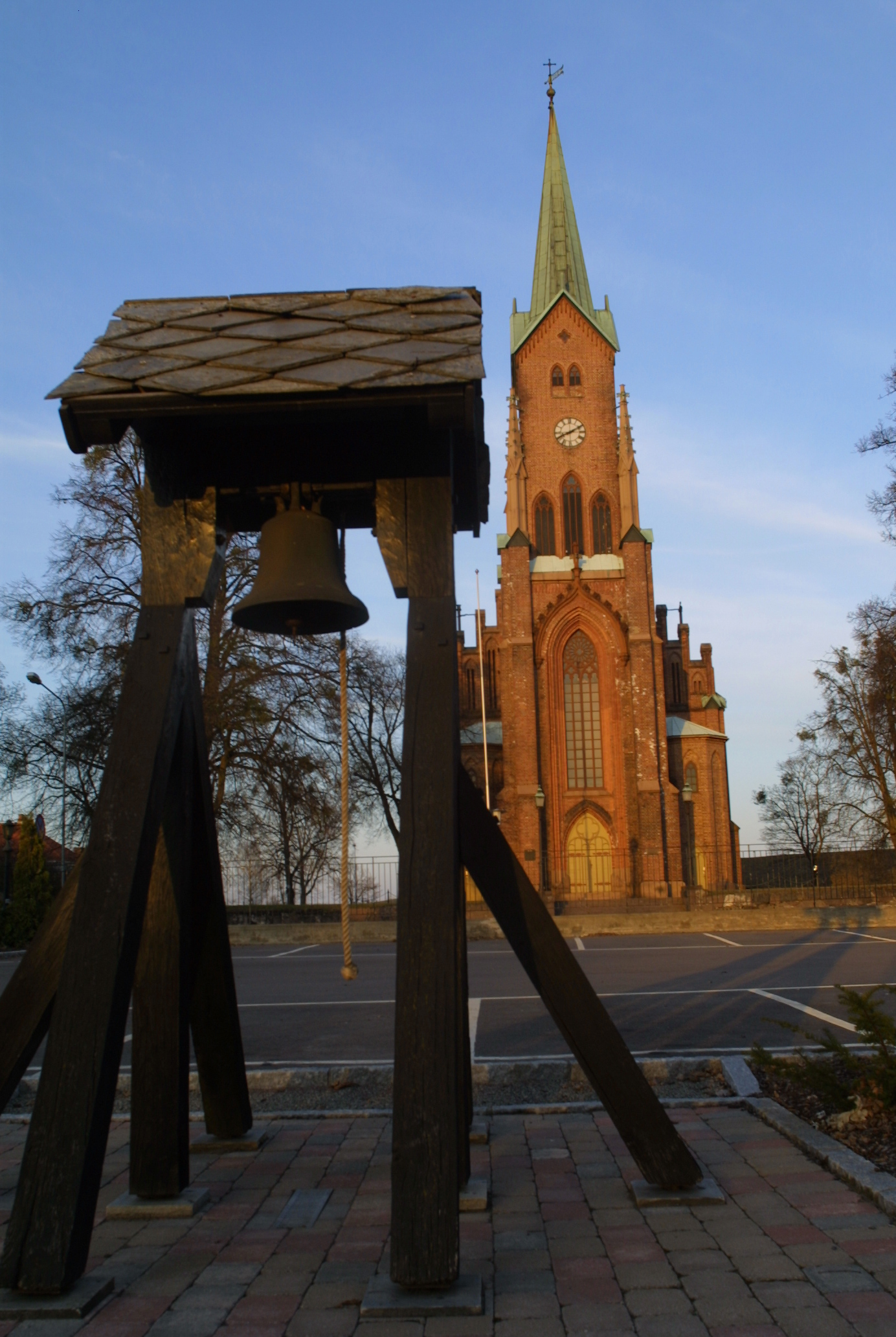

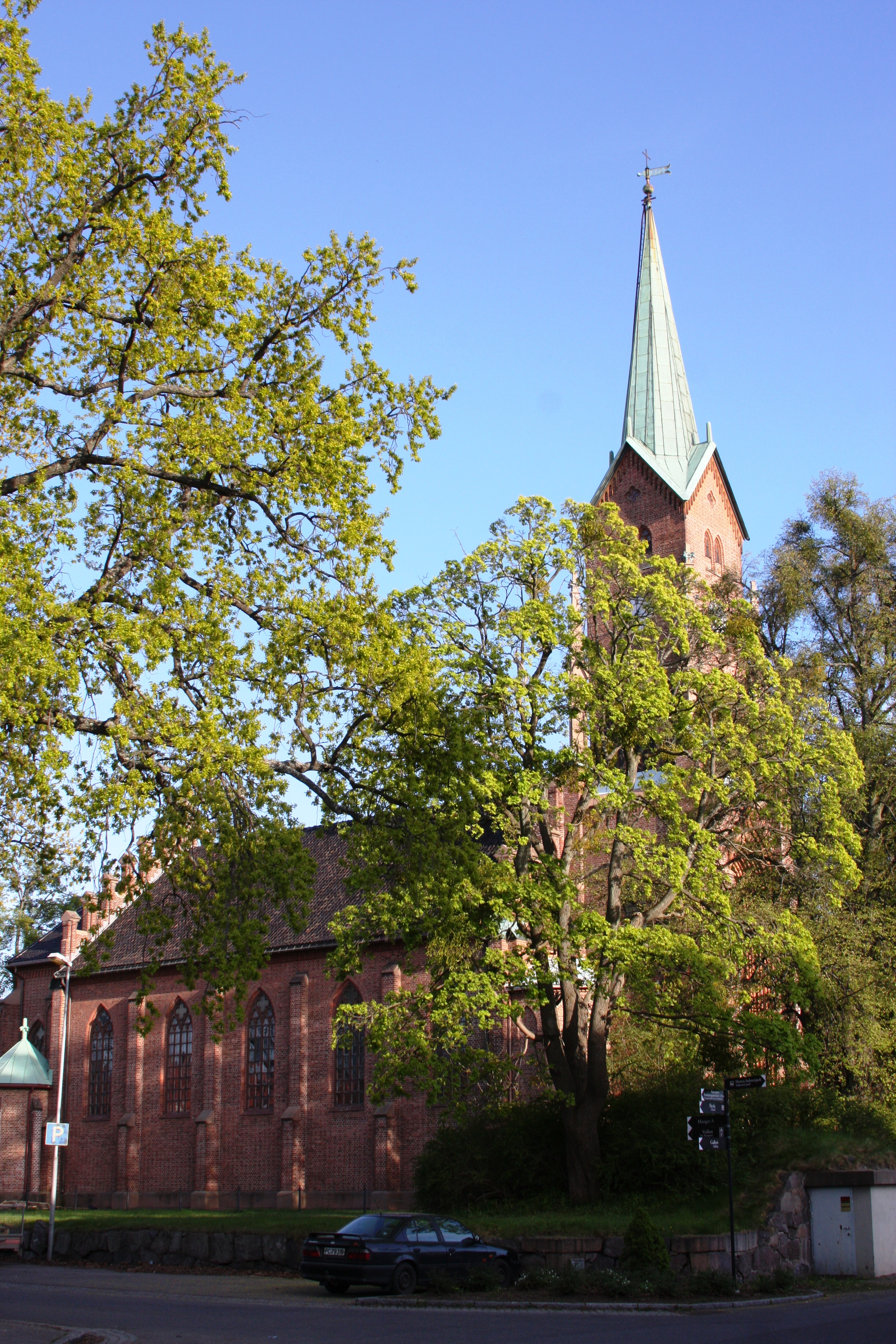

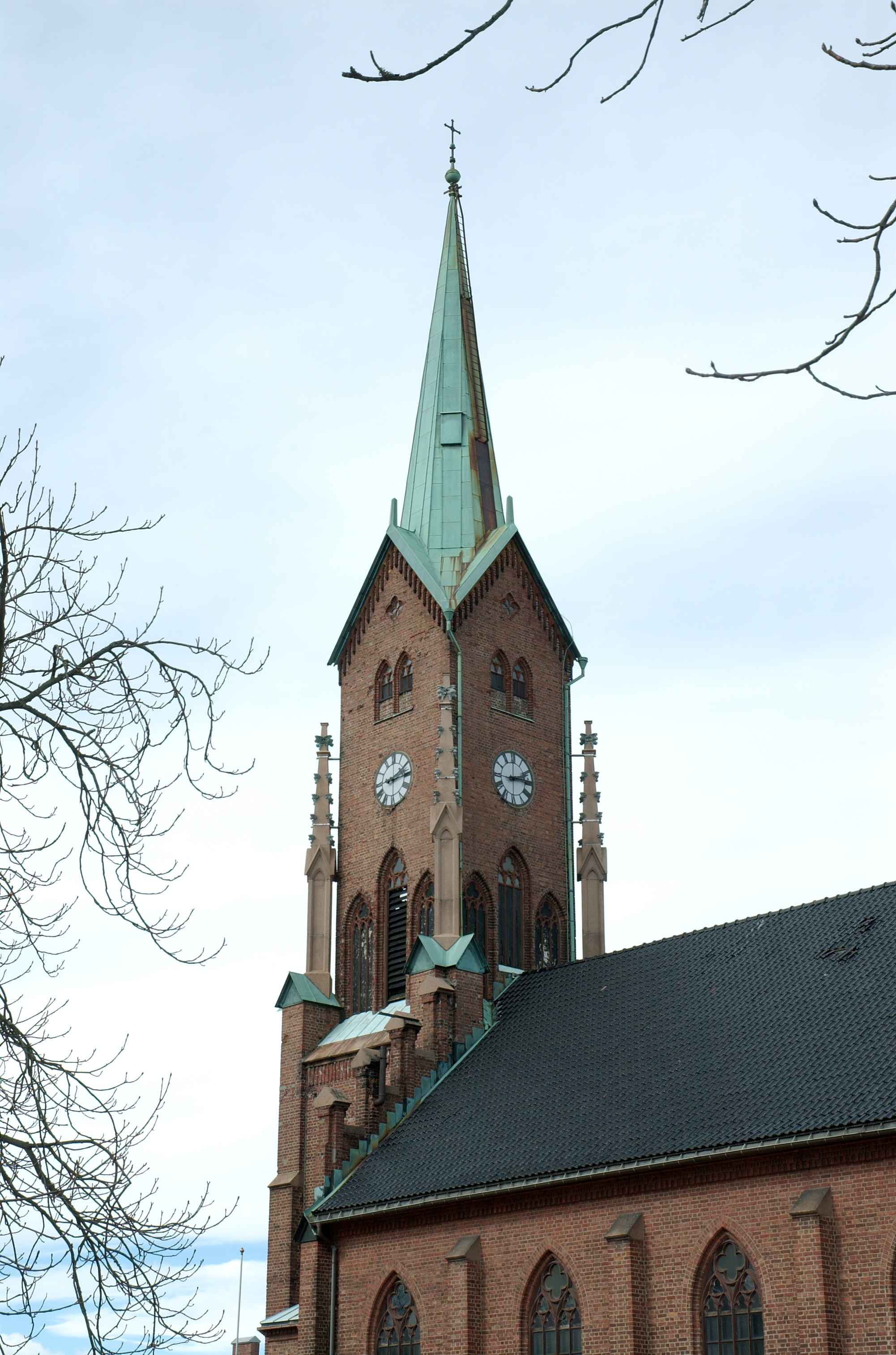

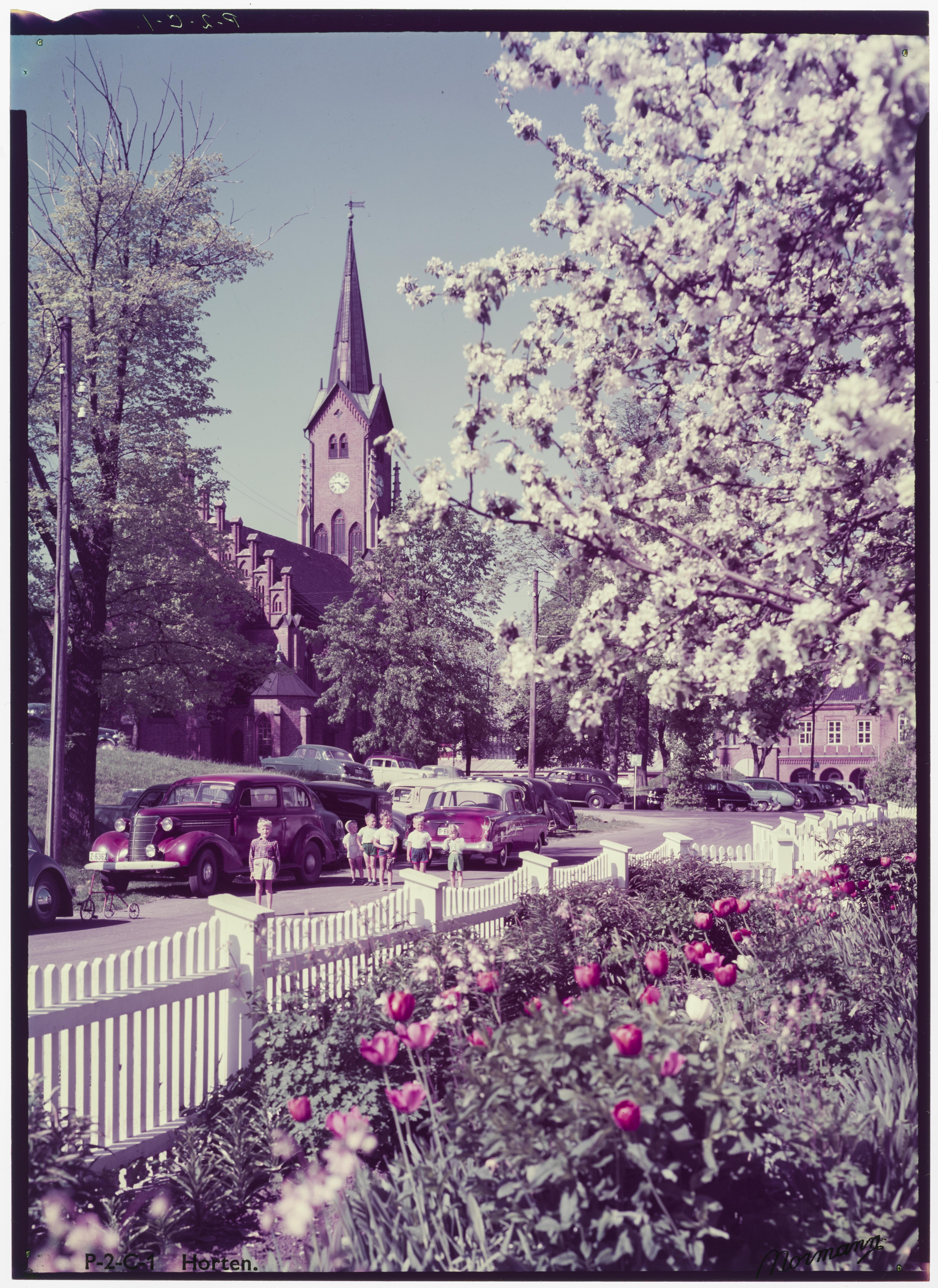

== See also ==
- List of churches in Tunsberg
