= Paul Lorck Eidem =

Norwegian writer and illustrator

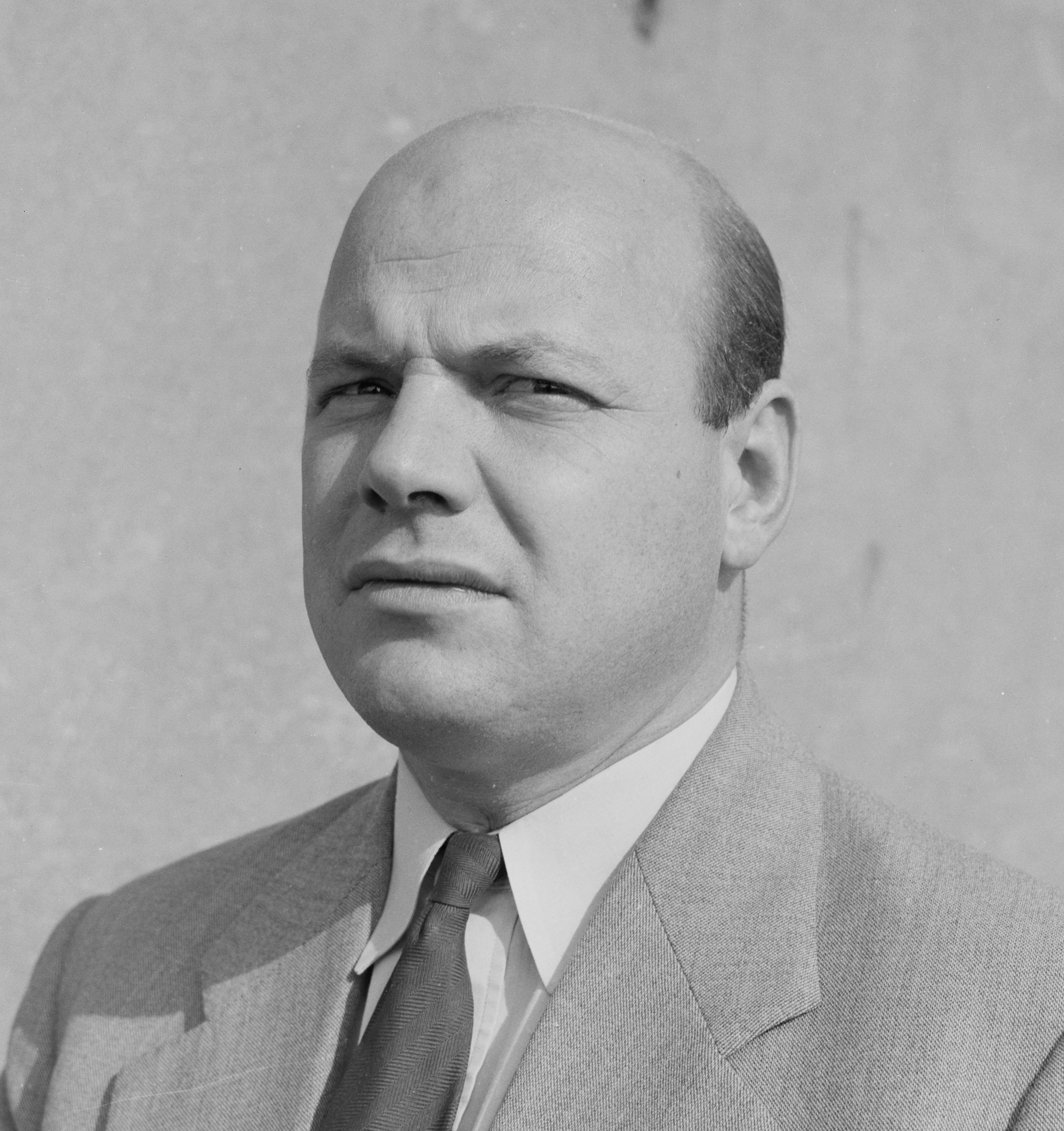
Paul Lorck Eidem

Paul Lorck Eidem (22 October 1909 – 24 September 1992) was a Norwegian writer and illustrator.

He was born in Horten, in Vestfold county, Norway. He grew up on the island Bastøy, where his stepfather was the warden of the special school for boys.

Eidem was known in his time for books such as En herre på byen (1941), En herre på nye veier (1942) and Eva – den store suksex (1958). He published the humorous book Juridisk billedbok together with Albert Wiesener, as well as children's books and non-fiction books about World War II. In addition to writing he was an illustrator and marketer by occupation.

He died in late 1992. In later years, his books have been used as sources on the cultural history of the day, especially slang.
