= Løvøy Chapel =

Church in Vestfold, Norway

- Løvøy kapell
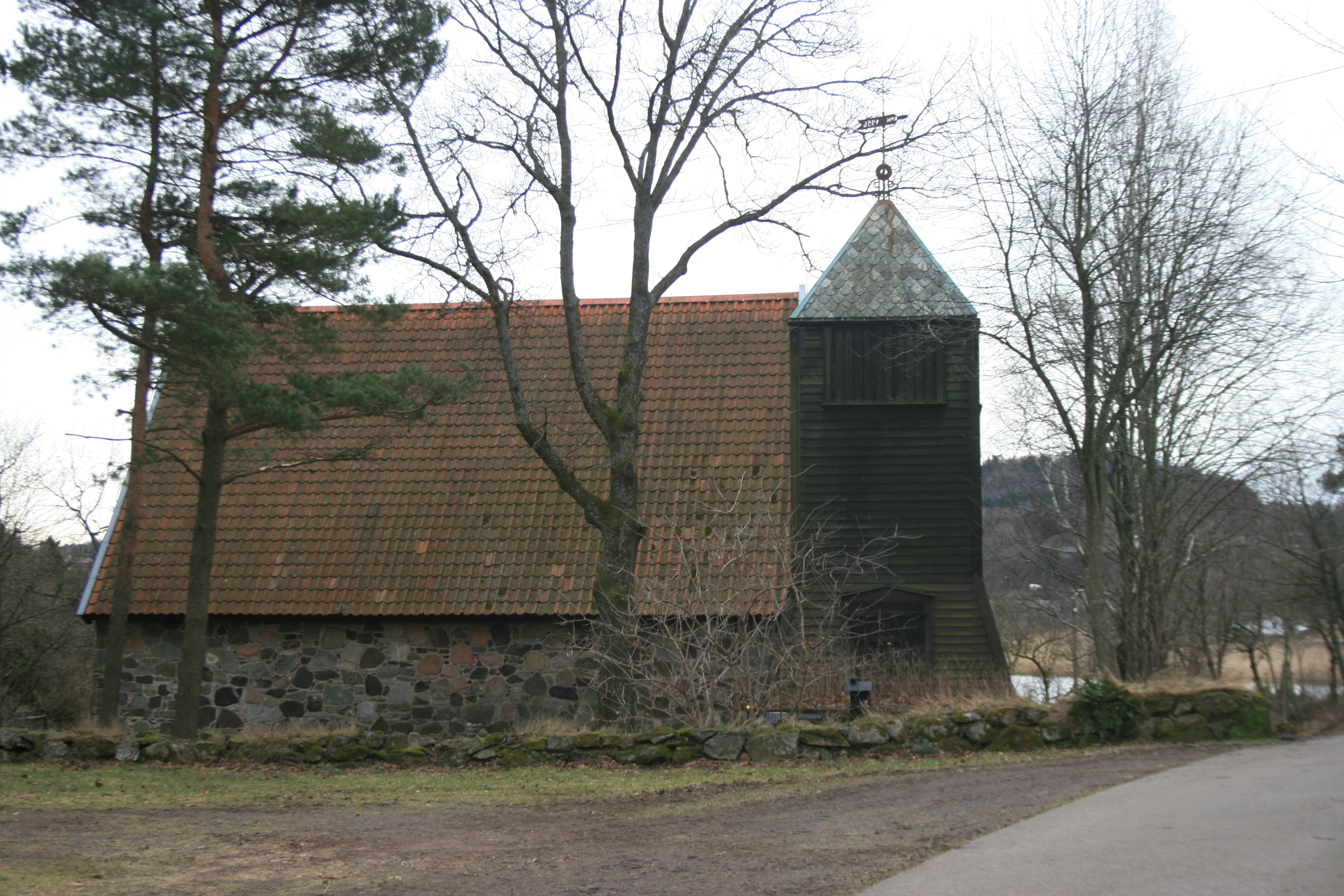
- View of the church
- Løvøy Chapel
- 59°26′54″N 10°26′16″E
- Location: Horten Municipality, Vestfold
- Country: Norway
- Denomination: Church of Norway
- Previous denomination: Catholic Church
- Churchmanship: Evangelical Lutheran

History
- Status: Parish church
- Founded: c. 1250
- Consecrated: c. 1250

Architecture
- Functional status: Active
- Architectural type: Rectangular
- Completed: c. 1250 (776 years ago)

Specifications
- Capacity: 100
- Materials: Stone

Administration
- Diocese: Tunsberg
- Deanery: Nord-Jarlsberg prosti
- Parish: Horten
- Norwegian Cultural Heritage Site
- Type: Church
- Status: Automatically protected
- ID: 84366

Løvøy Chapel (Norwegian: Løvøy kapell) is a restored parish church of the Church of Norway in Horten Municipality in Vestfold county, Norway. It is located on the peninsula of Løvøya on the north side of the town of Horten. It is one of the churches for the Horten parish which is part of the Nord-Jarlsberg prosti (deanery) in the Diocese of Tunsberg. It is only open in the summers. The gray, stone church was built in a rectangular design around the year 1200 using plans drawn up by an unknown architect. The church seats about 100 people.

== History ==
The earliest existing historical records of the church date back to the year 1398, but the church was not built that year. The stone church was likely built during the second half of the 13th century. The church was dedicated to St. Hallvard, and it was known as St. Hallvard's Church for most of its history. The church was built using local stone. It consisted of a nave with a choir in the same room with no dividing wall. The church was built next to a spring that was said to have healing powers, which led many people to make pilgrimages to the church.

The church fell into disrepair and was closed after the Reformation, but burials took place in the cemetery surrounding the church until the end of the 17th century. The Bishop of Christiania Jens Nilssøn wrote in his visit book from 1598: "There is a walled chapel on an island called Løvøen, and it is called St. Haldvor's chapel. It is now deserted, so that for many years services have not been held, but people on the island and around are attending Borre Church". Despite the fact that the church was in ruins, people continued to make pilgrimages to the chapel. In 1717, chief inspector Jørgen Olufsen Mandal wrote to Count Wedel that "common people of idle superstition tend at certain times in the summer to visit Løvø's dilapidated church in desperate numbers and give each a few shillings for its construction". In 1720, AP Styhr received permission to rebuild the old church, but he died in 1723 and the church was completed by that time. The church again fell into disrepair soon after once again. In the 19th century, only the walls were still standing and there was no roof left. In 1882, the ruins were protected, and four years later the Society for the Preservation of Ancient Norwegian Monuments took over ownership and responsibility for the ruins.

In 1928, a restoration project began under the leadership of Gerhard Fisher. The ruins at that time consisted of two gable walls with round window openings and partially collapsed side walls. His plan was basically to restore and secure the ruins. But in 1935, at the request of the antiquities association and local associations, and with the approval of the National Archives, Fisher came up with a detailed description of a complete restoration of the chapel. In 1950, the church was completed and re-consecrated on 27 August 1950. In 1962, the church name was formally changed to Løvøy Chapel (rather than the historic name: St. Hallvard Church).

== Media gallery ==
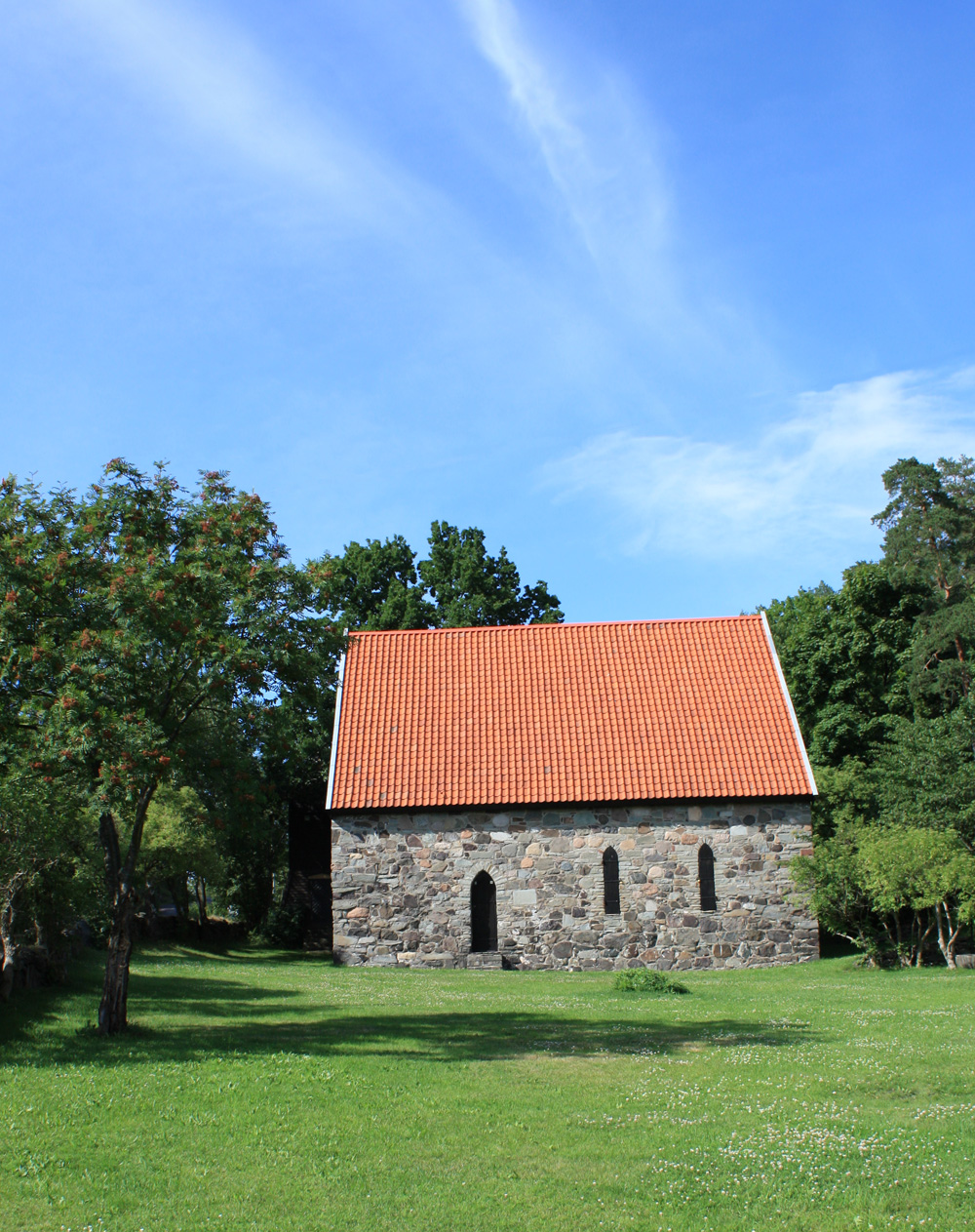

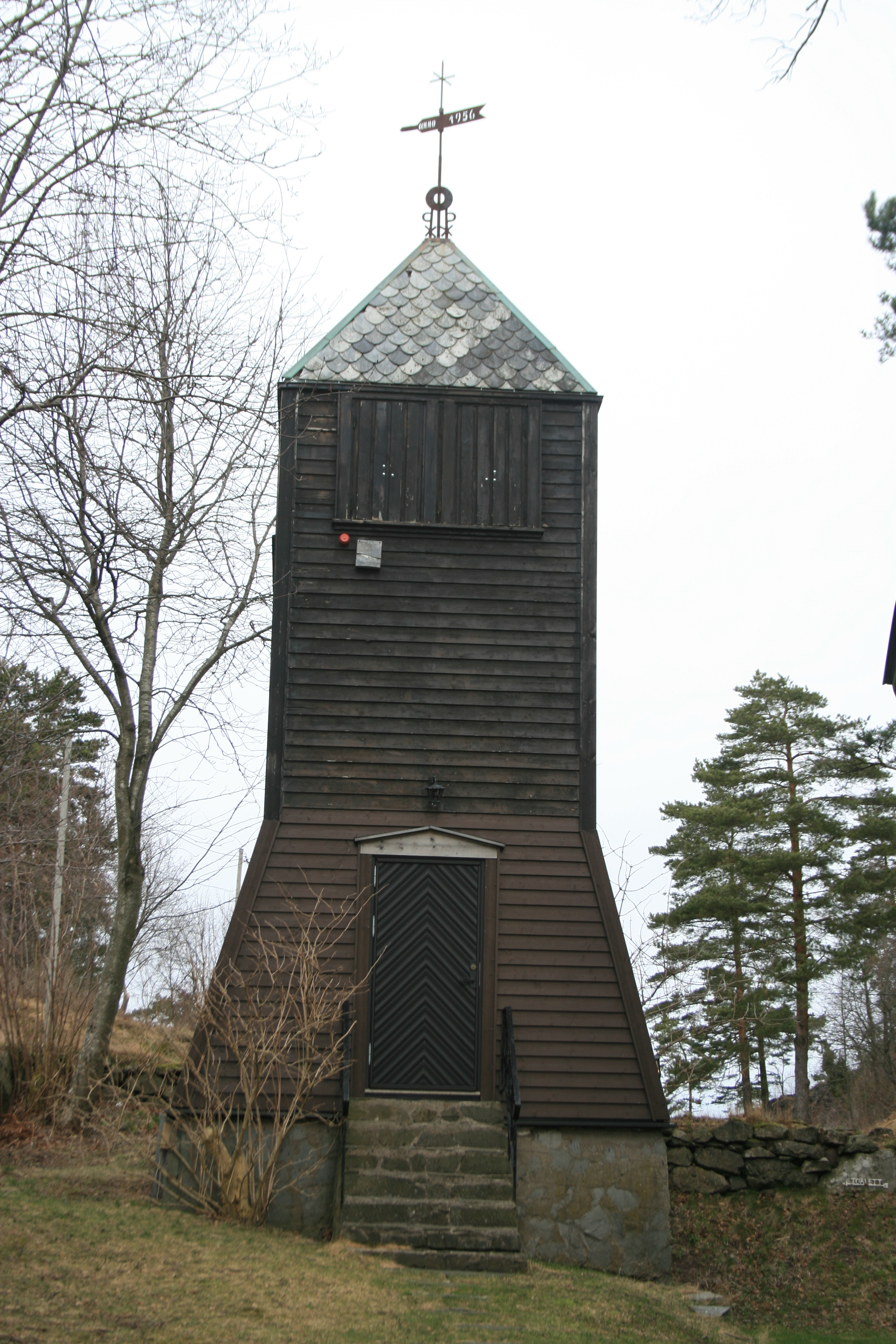

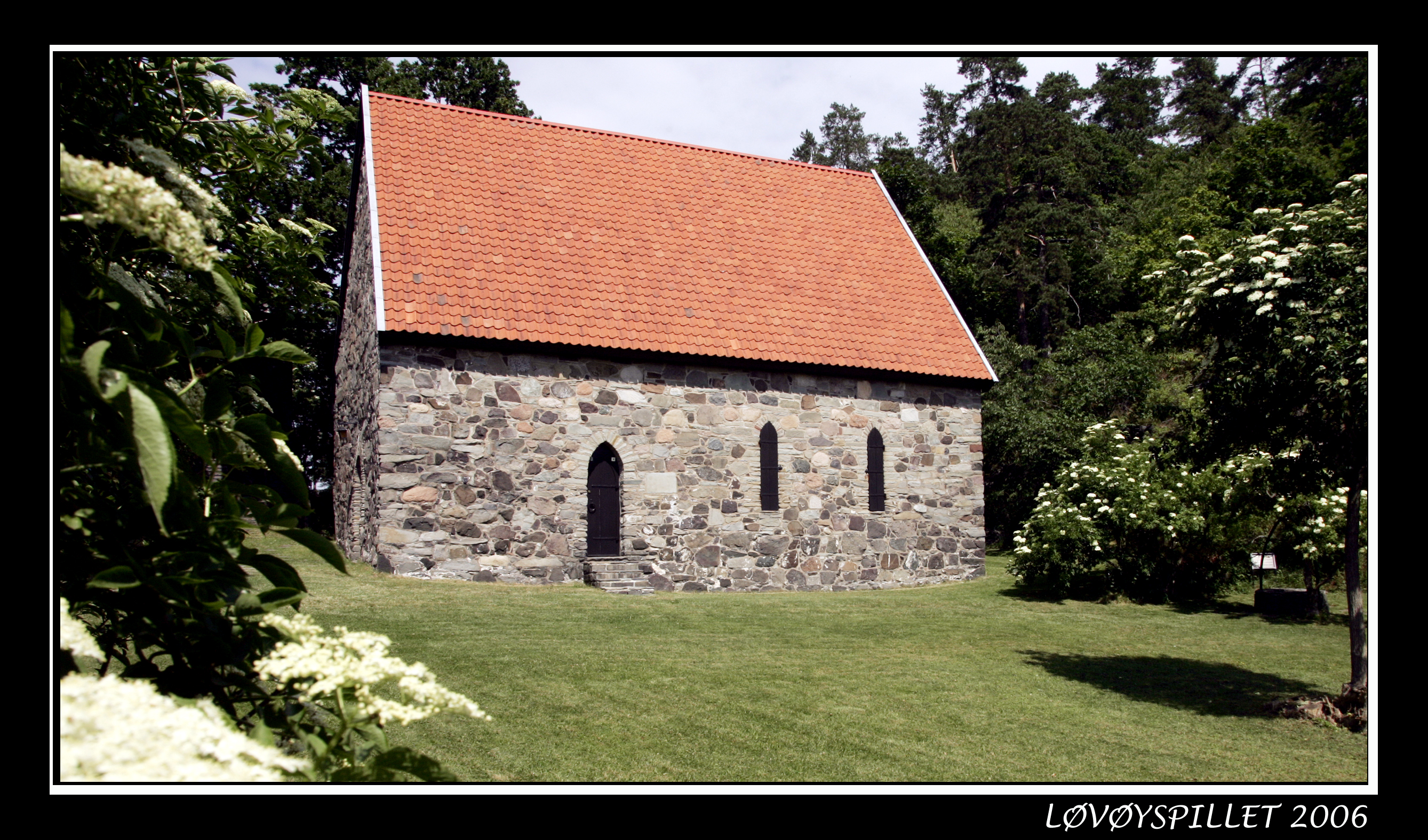

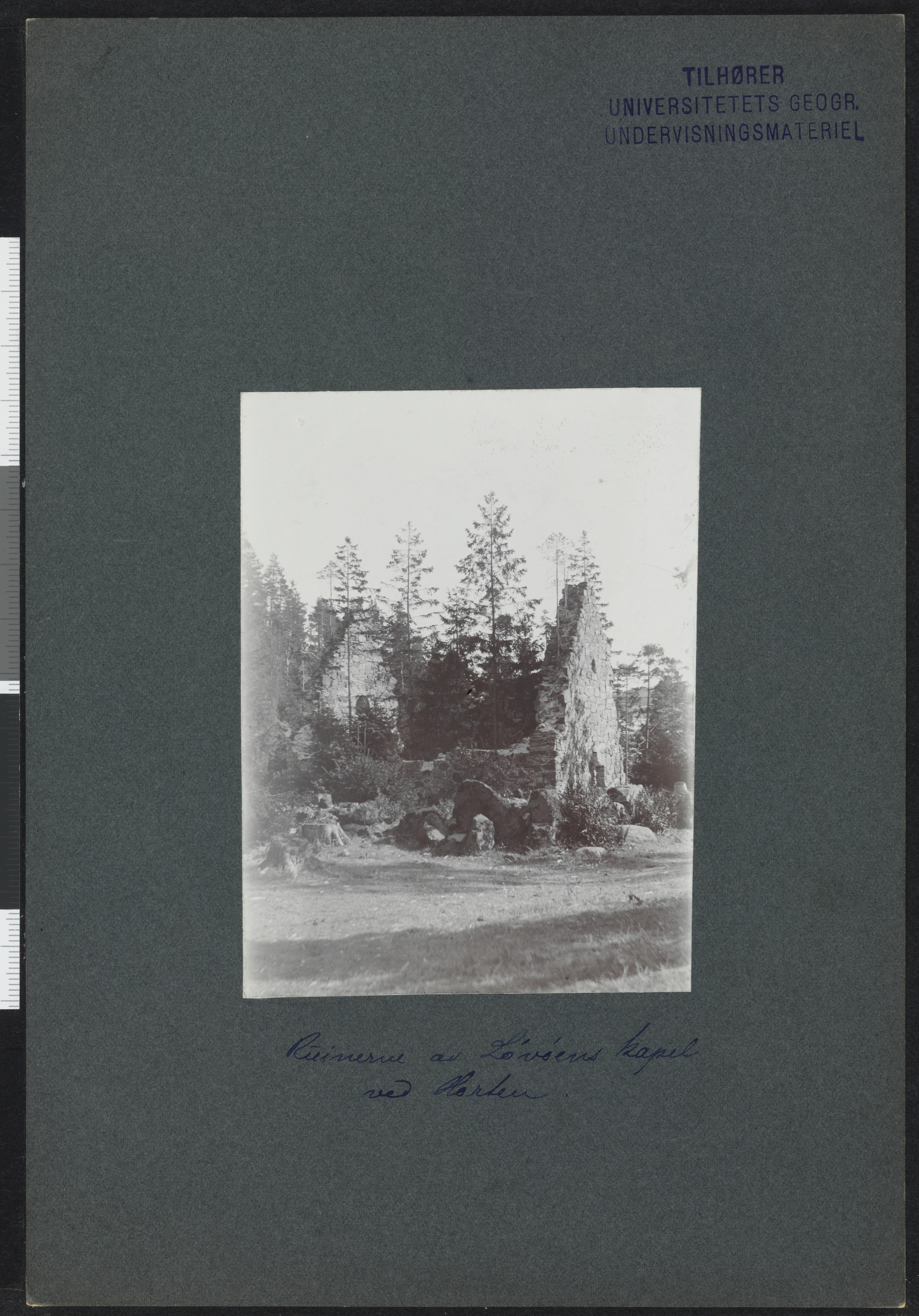

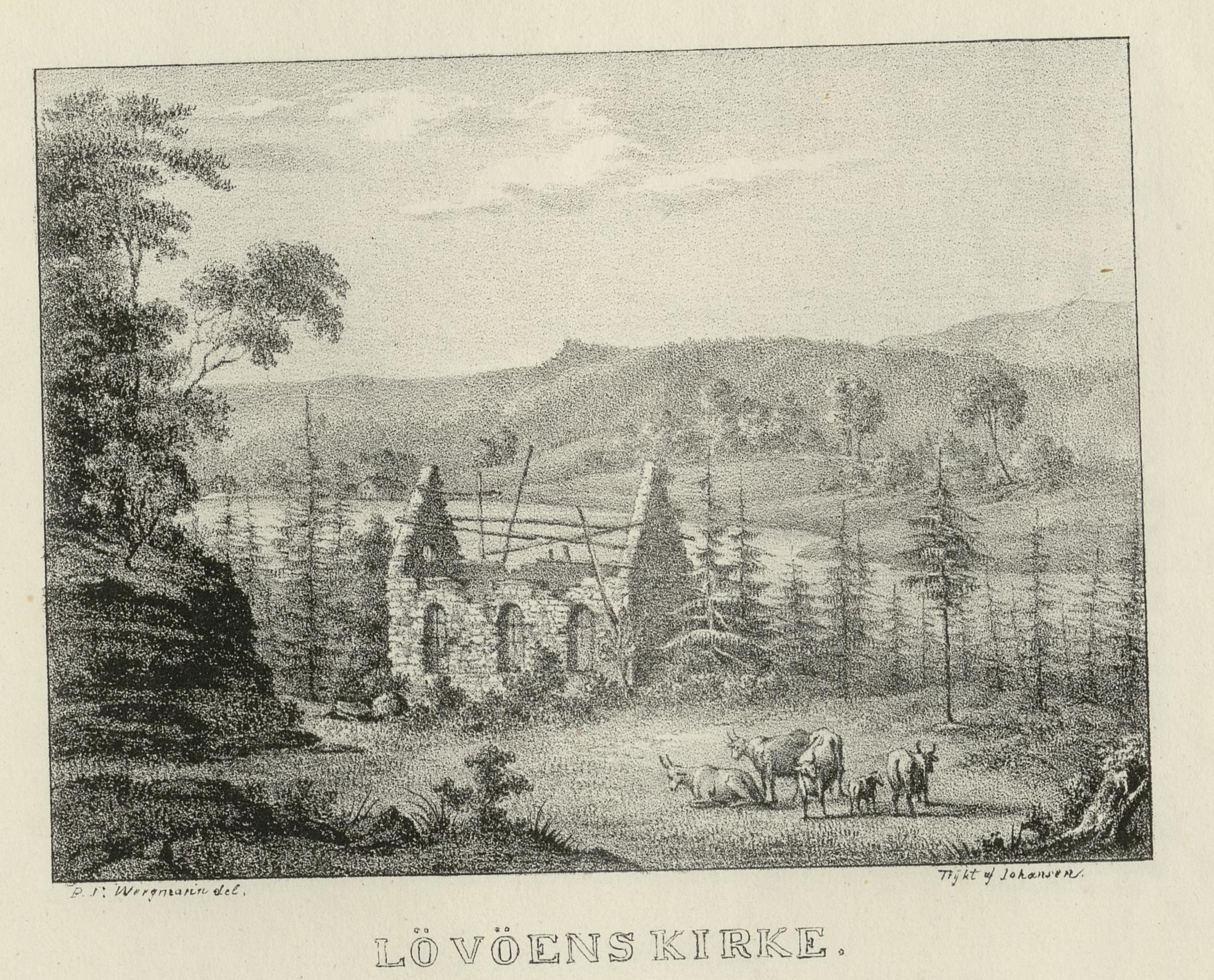

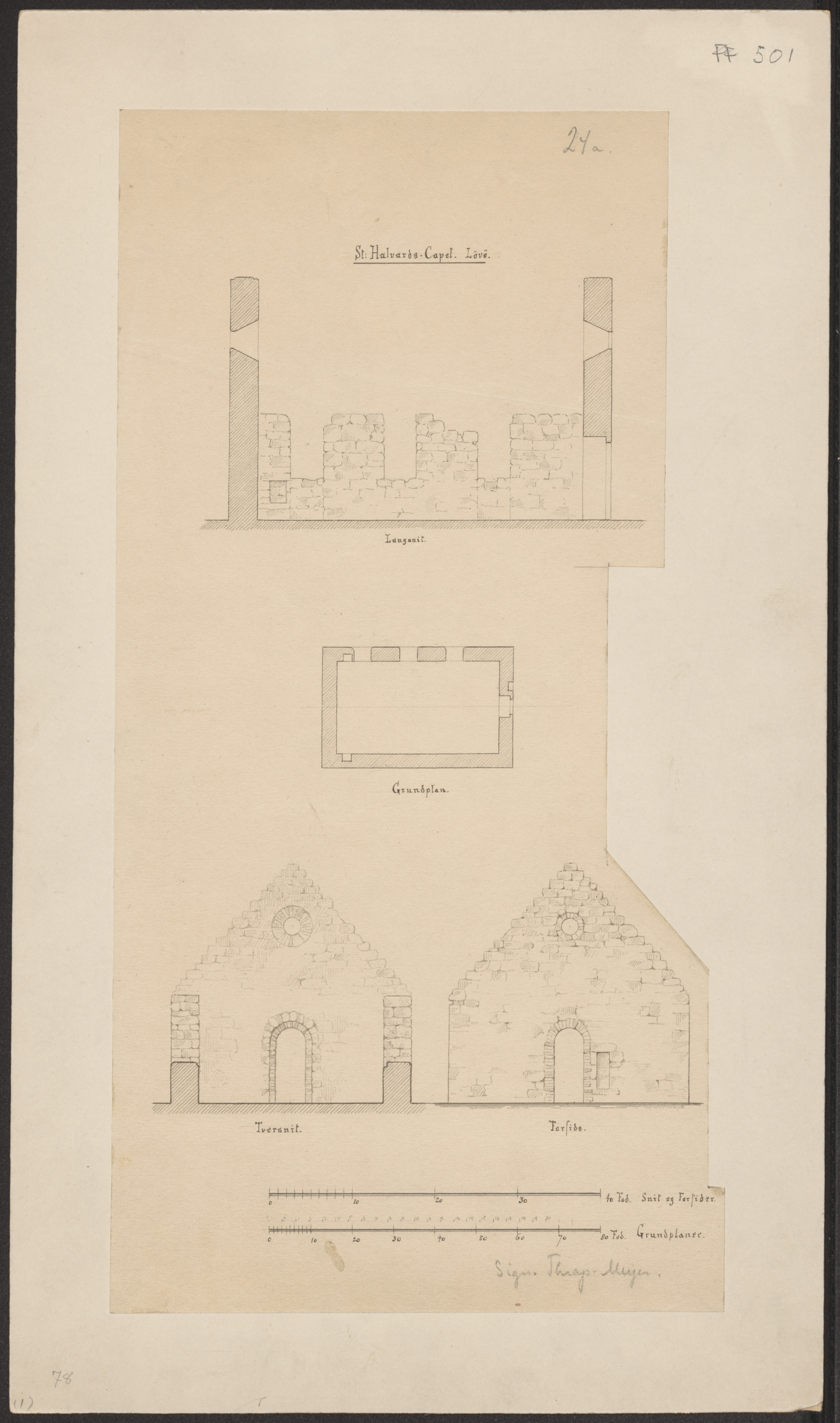

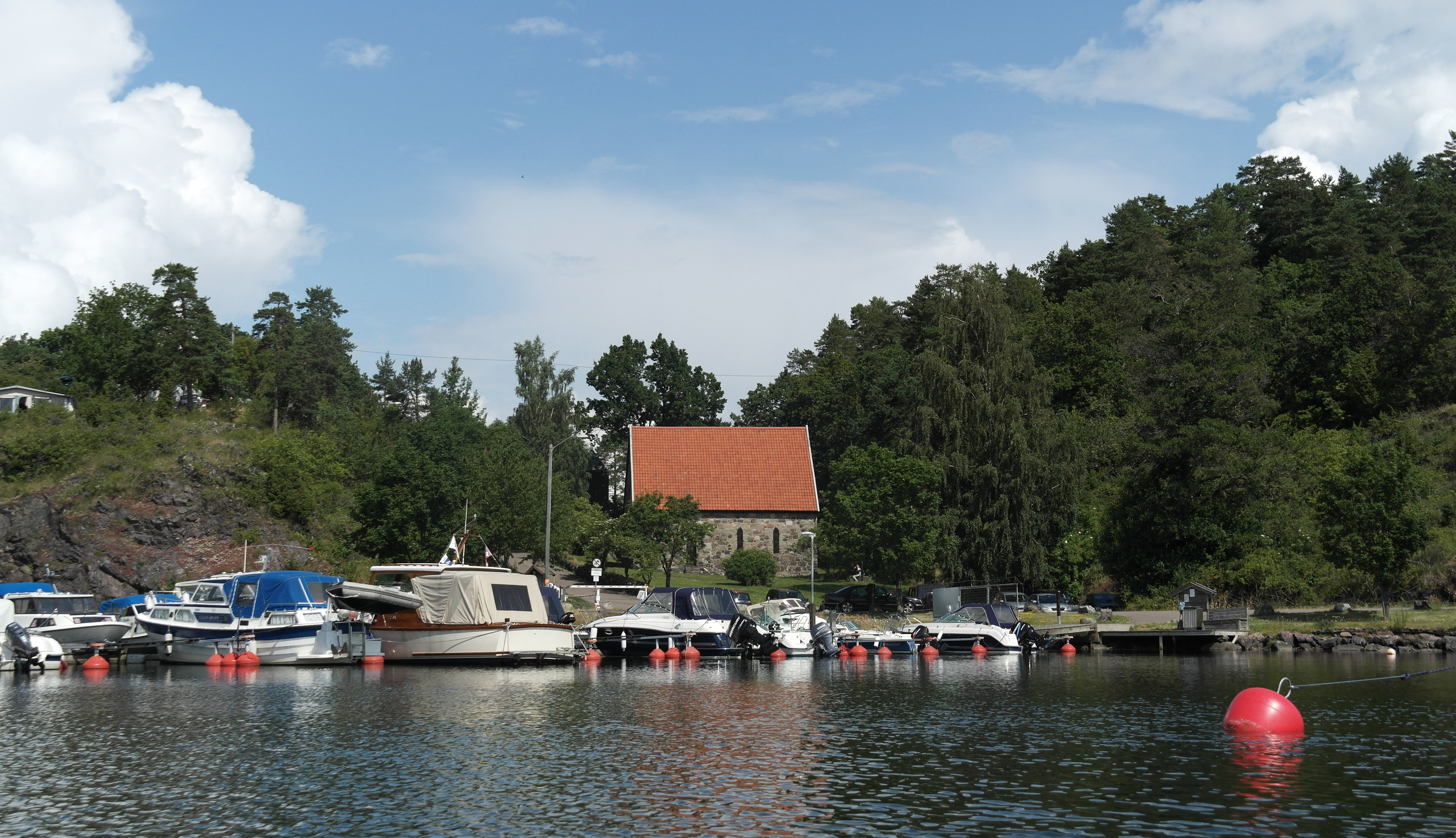

== See also ==
- List of churches in Tunsberg
