= Nils Henning Hontvedt =

Norwegian politician (born 1952)

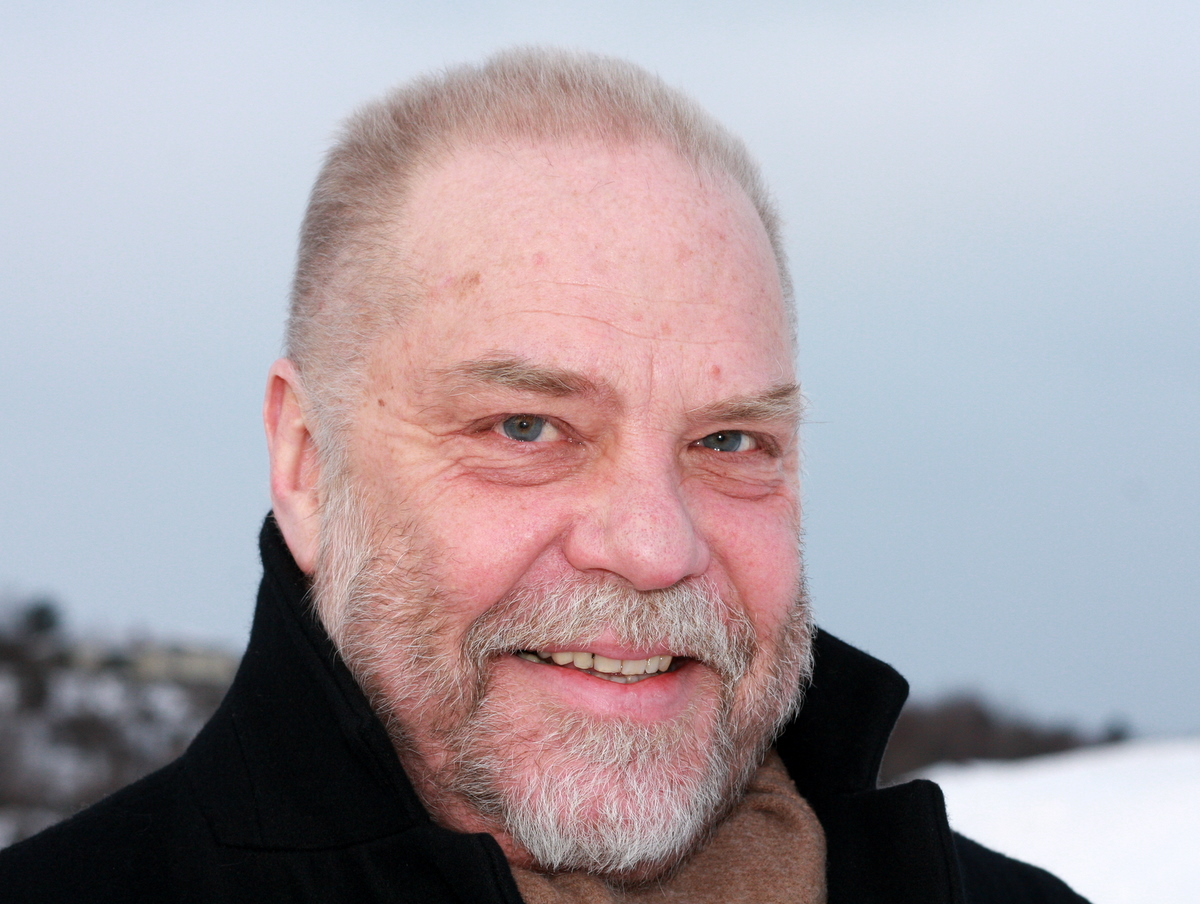
Nils Henning Hontvedt, November 2010

Nils Henning Hontvedt (born 27 August 1952) is a Norwegian politician for the Labour Party.

In 1997, during the cabinet Jagland, he was appointed political advisor in the Ministry of Justice and the Police.

He was mayor of Horten Municipality between 2001 and 2011.
