= Åsgårdstrand Church =

Church in Vestfold, Norway

- Åsgårdstrand kirke
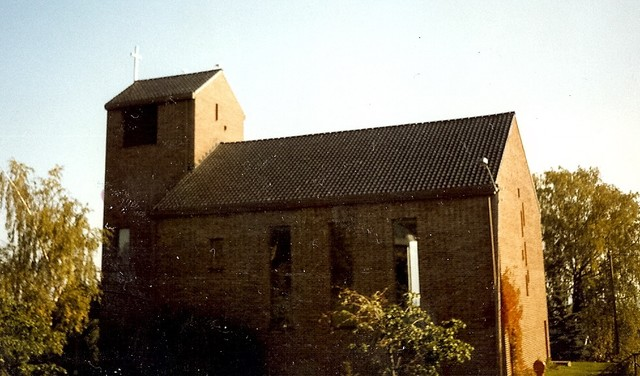
- View of the church
- Åsgårdstrand Church
- 59°20′52″N 10°28′05″E
- Location: Horten Municipality, Vestfold
- Country: Norway
- Denomination: Church of Norway
- Churchmanship: Evangelical Lutheran

History
- Status: Parish church
- Founded: 1969
- Consecrated: 26 May 1969

Architecture
- Functional status: Active
- Architect(s): Eva and Bernt Mejlænder
- Architectural type: Long church
- Completed: 1969 (57 years ago)

Specifications
- Capacity: 250
- Materials: Brick

Administration
- Diocese: Tunsberg
- Deanery: Nord-Jarlsberg prosti
- Parish: Åsgårdstrand
- Norwegian Cultural Heritage Site
- Type: Church
- Status: Not protected
- ID: 85996

Åsgårdstrand Church (Norwegian: Åsgårdstrand kirke) is a parish church of the Church of Norway in Horten Municipality in Vestfold county, Norway. It is located in the town of Åsgårdstrand. It is the church for the Åsgårdstrand parish which is part of the Nord-Jarlsberg prosti (deanery) in the Diocese of Tunsberg. The red brick church was built in a long church design in 1969 using plans drawn up by the architects Eva and Bernt Mejlænder. The church seats about 250 people.

== History ==
The idea of a church in Åsgårdstrand was first brought up during a bishop's visit in 1898 and again several times in the 1930s, but it was not until 1958 that a committee was set up to work on the matter. The church was designed by Eva and Bernt Mejlænder from Moss. The foundation stone was laid on 29 May 1968. The church was built over the next year with Brødrene Skjeggestad from Tønsberg as the main contractor. The new church was consecrated on 26 May 1969. The new church is a brick long church with a tower at the entrance in the north. During the 2010s, a 170-square-metre (1,800 sq ft) addition was built on the north end of the church.

== See also ==
- List of churches in Tunsberg
