= Henrik Leganger Frisak =

Norwegian politician

Henrik Leganger Frisak (18 July 1852 – 15 January 1939) was a Norwegian judge and politician for the Liberal Party.

He was born at Lund in Romedal Municipality as a son of infantry captain Erik Gløersen Frisak (1804–1877) and Henriette Cornelia Leganger (1822–1866). He finished his secondary education in Kristiania in 1867 and took the cand.jur. degree in 1874. After a year as stenographer in the Parliament of Norway, he was a law clerk for the district stipendiary magistrate of Romsdal District Court from 1875 to 1878 and an attorney based in Aalesund from 1878 to 1898. He was also acting district stipendiary magistrate of Romsdal for one and a half year. In 1898 he became district stipendiary magistrate of Nordre Søndmør District Court.

He was a member of the municipal council for Aalesund Municipality from 1890 to 1896 and again from 1898. He served as mayor from 1901 to 1904 and 1907 to 1909. He was elected to the Parliament of Norway in 1909, representing the urban constituency of Aalesund og Molde.

When Edvard Hagerup Bull became a parliamentarian, Frisak became an acting Supreme Court Assessor in 1913. He was also extraordinary Assessor.

He is a first cousin of Aasmund Frisak, and a brother of Kristiane Frisak. With Betty Laura Width Fyhn (1858–1944) he had the daughter Astri Frisak, and the daughter Unni Liv Frisak who married Hans Backer Fürst. He died in 1939.
