= Christian Wilhelm Wisbech =

Norwegian naval officer and politician

Christian Wilhelm Wisbech (7 October 1832 – 5 April 1897) was a Norwegian naval officer and politician for the Conservative Party.

== Early life ==
He was born in Bergen as the son of Christian Wisbech (1801–1869) and his wife Alida Georgine Brunchorst (1803–1860). He married Thora Heiberg.

== Career ==
Wisbech was a Captain in the Royal Norwegian Navy. He was also elected to the Norwegian Parliament in 1883 and 1889, representing the constituency of Jarlsberg og Larviks Amt.

== Death ==
He died in 1897 in Horten.
