= Bastøy =

Island in Horten, Norway

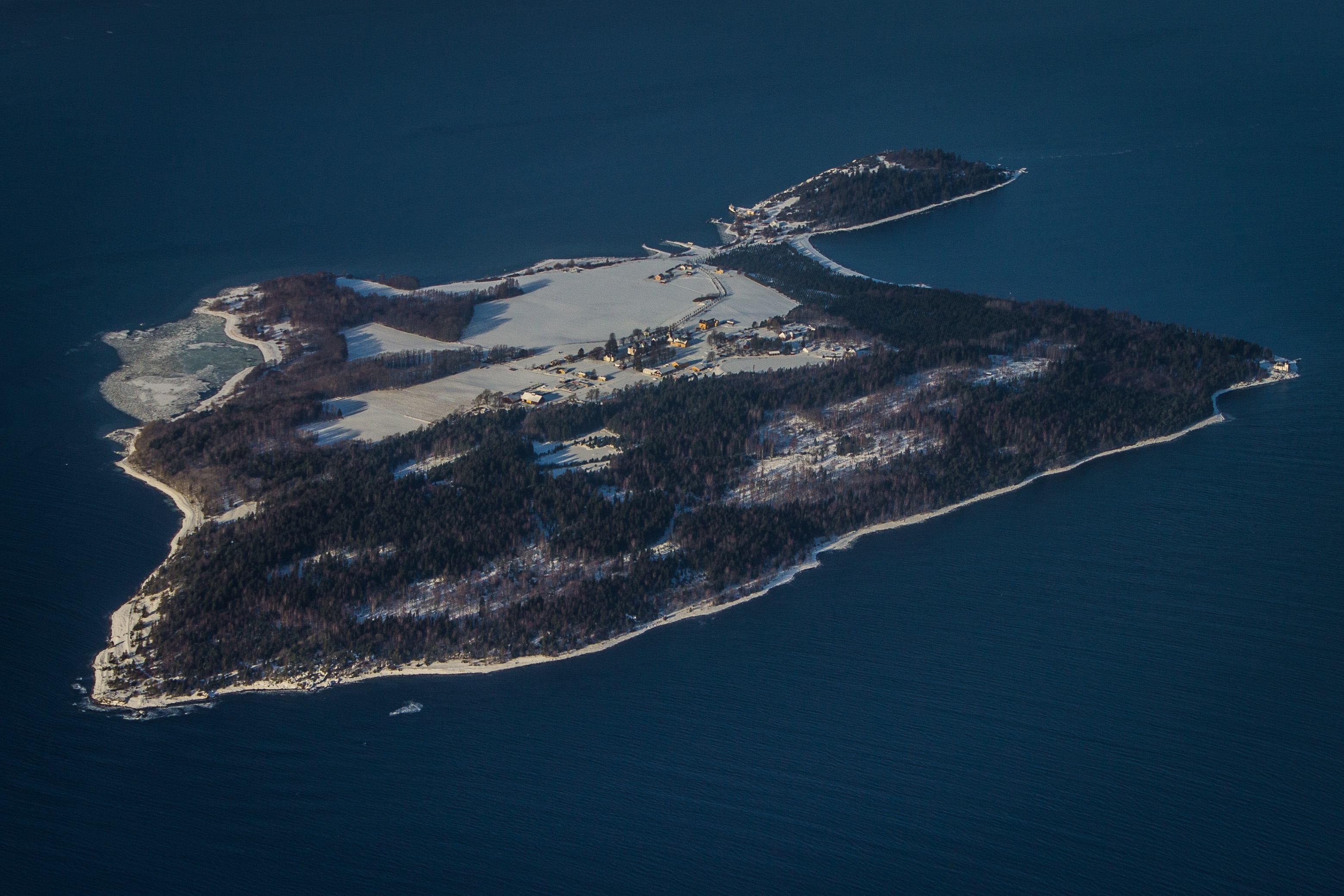
- Interactive map of the island

Geography
- Location: Vestfold, Norway
- Coordinates: 59°22′48.55″N 10°31′29.65″E
- Area: 2.23 km^{2} (0.86 sq mi)
- Length: 3 km (1.9 mi)
- Width: 1.5 km (0.93 mi)

Administration
- Norway
- County: Vestfold
- Municipality: Horten Municipality

Demographics
- Population: 0 (2024)

Bastøy is an island in Horten Municipality in Vestfold county, Norway. The 2.23-square-kilometre (550-acre) island is owned by the government and it has no permanent residents, however, Bastøy Prison, a minimum-security prison, is located on the island, so there are always temporary residents on the island. The Bastøy Lighthouse was established on the island in 1840.

== History ==
The island was purchased by the government of Norway in 1898 and it was used for a "special school home for neglected boys". Later, Bastøy was used as a shelter for alcoholics starting in 1971. Since 1998, the island has been used as a national minimum-security prison. The prison is fairly open and large parts of the island are used by the prisoners for farming. Bastøy bay and Bastøykalven in the north of the island are public open spaces and can be used for swimming and boating.

== Nature ==
All animal and plant life is protected in the Bastøy landscape conservation area. In reality, it applies to the whole island, but the main nature reserve covers the Buvika/Rødskjær wetland area. In total, 315 different plant species have been registered on the island, including Pulsatilla pratensis, spring onion, and dragon's head.

== See also ==
- List of islands of Norway
