= Gjengangeren =

Local newspaper of Horten, Norway

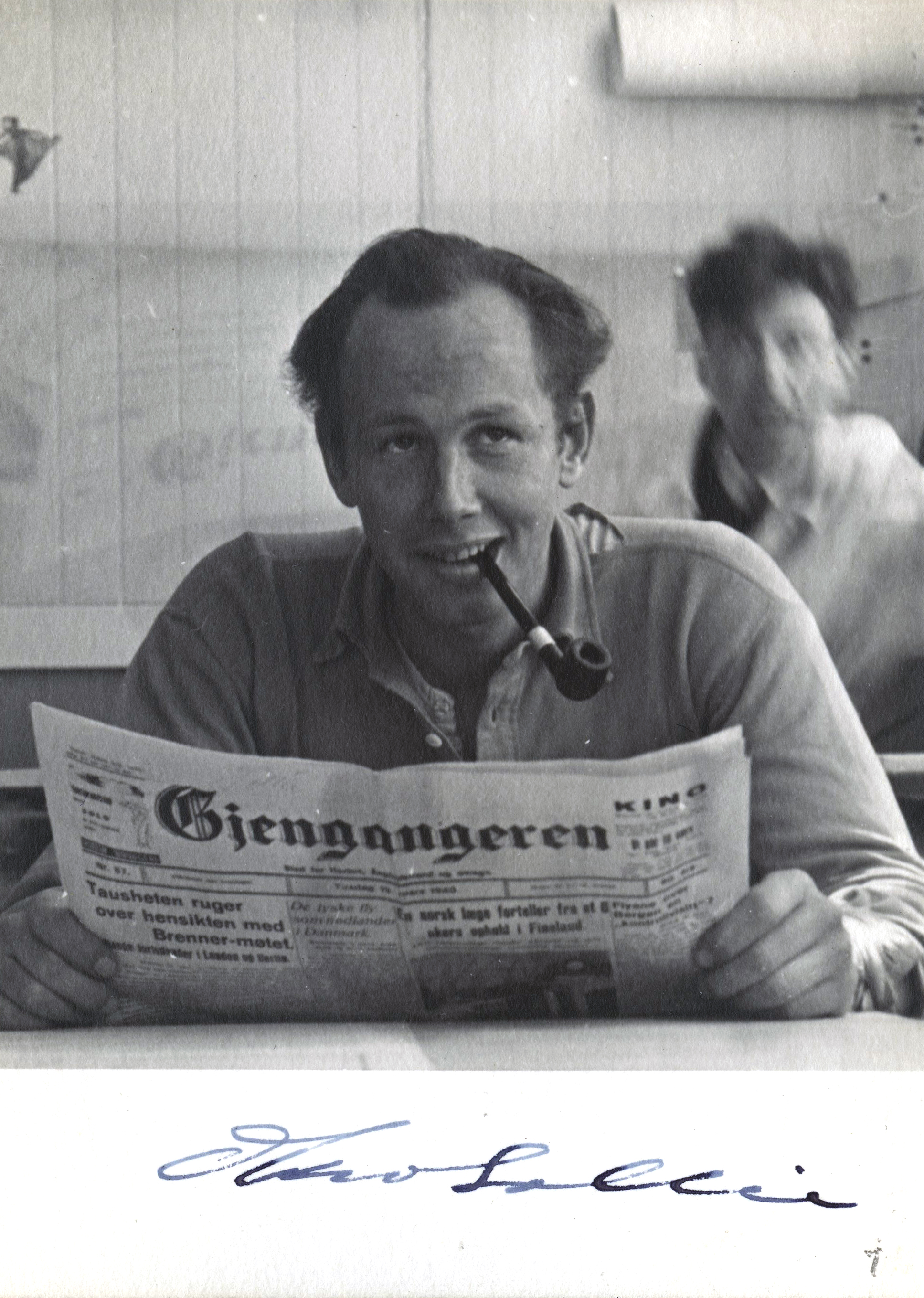
- Olav Sollie holding Gjengangeren newspaper in 1940
- Type: Daily newspaper
- Format: Tabloid
- Owner: Edda Media
- Editor: Jan Erik Hvidsten
- Founded: 1851
- Headquarters: Storgaten 38, Horten
- Circulation: 5867
- Website: www.gjengangeren.no

Gjengangeren is a local newspaper published in Horten Municipality, Norway. It was established in 1851.

It has a circulation of 5867, of whom 5732 are subscribers.
