= Aasmund Frisak =

Norwegian politician (1852-1935)

- Born: March 20, 1852; Grimstad
- Died: 1935 (aged 82–83)
- Burial place: Vestre gravlund
- Relatives: Hans Frisak and Sophie Augusta Berntsen
- Military career
- Allegiance: Norway
- Branch: Navy
- Rank: Commander
- Other work: Politician

Aasmund Frisak (20 March 1852 – 1935) was a Norwegian naval officer and politician for the Conservative Party.

He was born in Grimstad as a son of district physician Hans Frisak and Sophie Augusta Berntsen. He was a first cousin of Henrik Leganger Frisak, and of Kristiane Frisak.

He graduated from the Norwegian Naval Academy in 1872. After running the sailors' school in Fredrikshald from 1878 to 1887 he returned to Horten as teacher at the Norwegian Naval Academy from 1891 to 1897. In 1897 he was hired at the Karljohansvern shipyard. He held the ranks of Captain from 1894 and Commander from 1899. He was also a local bank director. From 1901 to 1904 he served as mayor of Horten municipality, and he was elected to the Parliament of Norway in 1903, representing the rural constituency of Jarlsberg og Larviks Amt.

From 1911 he worked in Trondhjem. After his death he was buried at Vestre gravlund in 1935.
