= Jarlsberg Tunnel =

Runs through Frodeåsen in Tønsberg, Norway

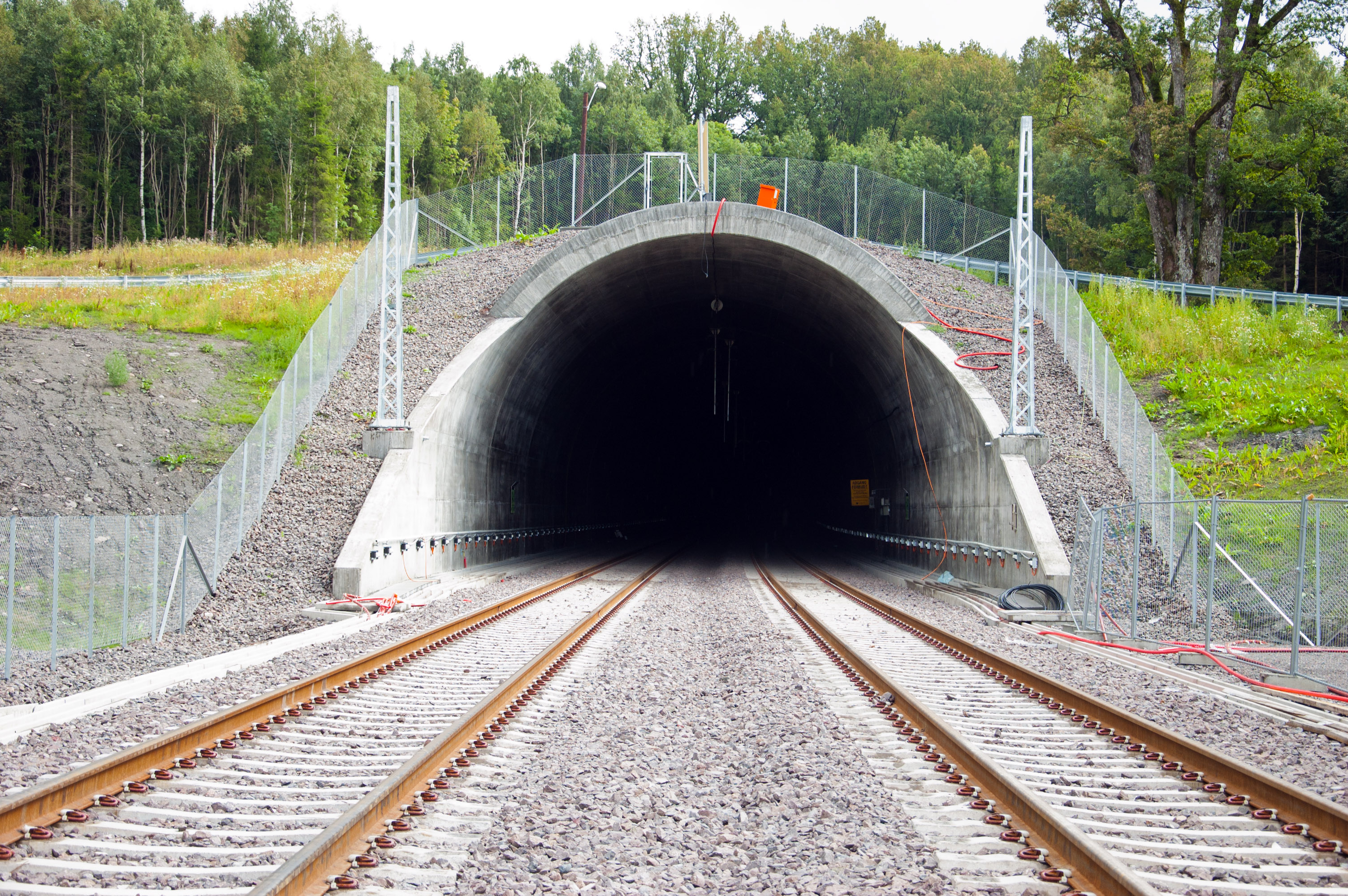
- The northern entrance during the late phase of construction, before overhead wire was installed
- Interactive map of Jarlsberg Tunnel

Overview
- Line: Vestfold Line
- Location: Frodeåsen, Tønsberg, Norway
- Coordinates: 59.2841°N 10.4061°E
- Start: Tomsbakken
- End: Frodegata

Operation
- Opened: 7 November 2011
- Owner: Norwegian National Rail Administration

Technical
- Line length: 1,750 m (1.09 mi)
- No. of tracks: Double
- Track gauge: 1,435 mm (4 ft 8 1/2 in)
- Electrified: 15 kV 16.7 Hz AC
- Operating speed: 200 km/h (120 mph)

The Jarlsberg Tunnel (Norwegian: Jarlsbergtunnelen) is a 1,750-meter (1.09 mi) long double track railway tunnel which runs through Frodeåsen in the city of Tønsberg in Tønsberg Municipality, Vestfold county, Norway. Located on the Vestfold Line, the tunnel was built as part of the 7.8-kilometer (4.8 mi) double-track high-speed segment from Barkåker to Tønsberg. It is located just north of Tønsberg Station and runs between Frodegata and Tomsbakken. Most of the tunnel is blasted, although 223 meters (732 ft) is in a concrete culvert. Planning of the tunnel started in the late 1990s. Several railway interest groups advised against building the isolated segment of upgraded track without a complete plan for upgrading the entire line. Construction started in April 2009 and the new section and the tunnel opened on 7 November 2011. It was the fourth segment of the Vestfold Line to be upgraded.

== Specifications ==
Map of the Barkåker–Tønsberg segment, including the tunnel

The Jarlsberg Tunnel runs roughly north–south through Frodeåsen, a hill just north of the town center of Tønsberg. The northern entrance is located at Tomsbakken, beside County Road 35 and the southern entrance is located at Frodegata in the town center. Just south of the tunnel lies Tønsberg Station. The tunnel is 1,750 meters (5,740 ft) long, of which 1,560 meters (5,120 ft) is blasted through bedrock and 223 meters (732 ft) is concrete culvert. The portal on the Tønsberg side is 73 meters (240 ft) long.

The Jarlsberg Tunnel constitutes the southernmost part of the 7.8-kilometer-long (4.8 mi) double-track segment of the Vestfold Line between Barkåker and Tønsberg. It is electrified at 15 kV 16.7 Hz AC, has an NSI-63 signaling system and is dimensioned for 200 kilometers per hour (120 mph). The crosscut serves as an emergency exit. The railway tunnel crosses 2.5 to 3.0 meters (8 ft 2 in to 9 ft 10 in) above the Frodeåsen Tunnel, a twin-tube tunnel of County Road 300. The tunnel's single crosscut serves as an emergency exit. The line is owned and maintained by the Norwegian National Rail Administration.

== History ==
The Vestfold Line opened in 1881 as a narrow-gauge railway. Although later converted to standard gauge and electrified, the line retains poor capacity and many curves. The only previous tunnel north of Larvik is the 288-meter-long (945 ft) Smørstein Tunnel, which was completed in 1921. In the early 1990s, work started on increasing speed, capacity and reliability by building shorter sections of double-track with higher permitted speeds. During this period, there was very little investment funding for railways; thus the Vestfold Line was split into a series of small segments, each which was planned individually. Between 1995 and 2003, three sections with a combined length of 23 kilometers (14 mi) were opened. The segment between Barkåker and Tønsberg was the fourth section of the line to be upgraded. When later projects are completed, it will allow travel time from Tønsberg to Oslo to be reduced from 90 to 60 minutes.

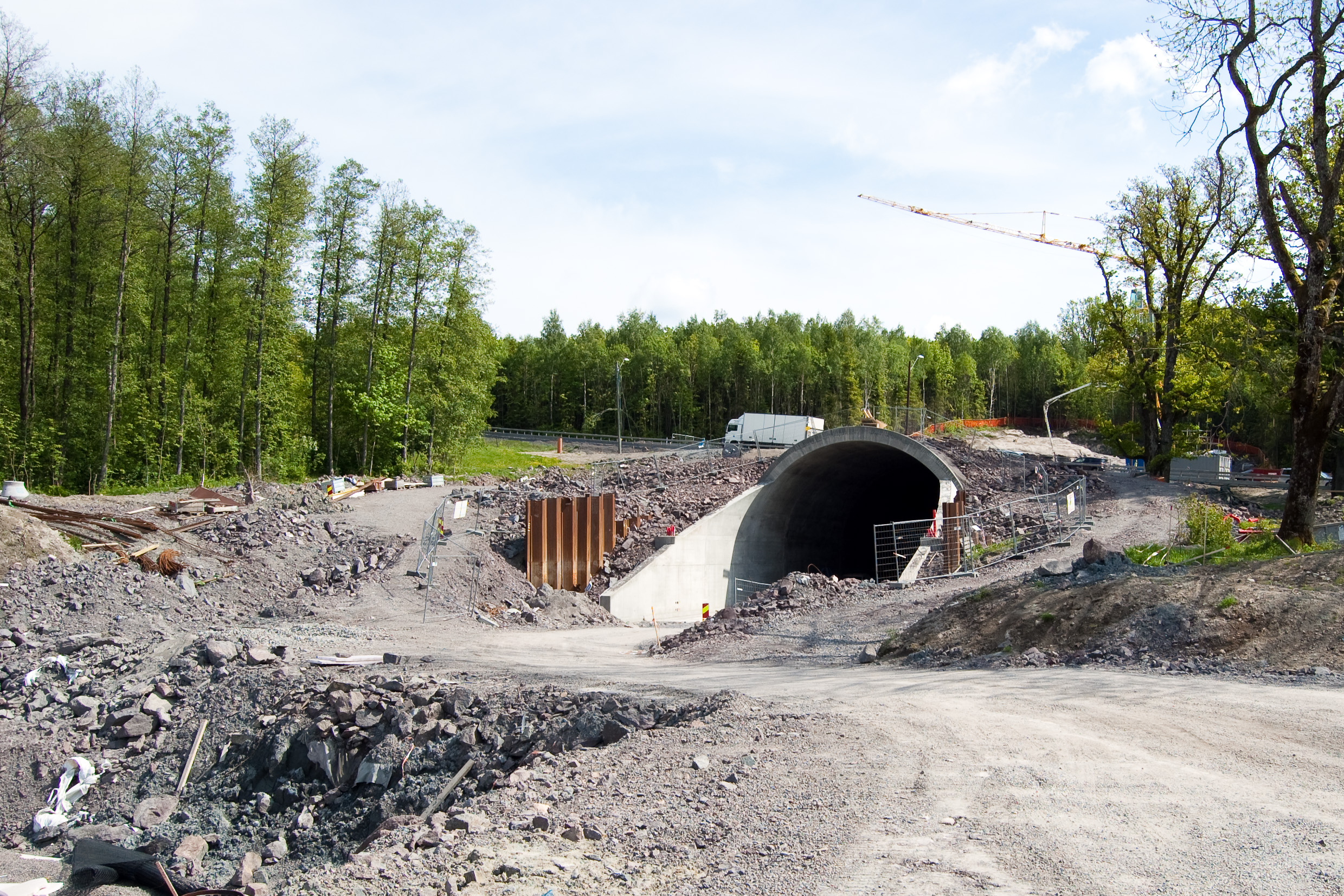
Construction at the northern entrance during May 2010

Initial planning of the segment between Barkåker and Tønsberg considered 13 different initial route proposals. However, no analysis for possible rights-of-way south of Tønsberg or north of Barkåker were considered. In September 1999, the government presented their proposal for National Transport Plan 2002–11, which included three segments on the Vestfold Line: Holm–Nykirke, Barkåker–Tønsberg and Farriseidet–Porsgrunn. When Parliament passed the plan in February 2001, the Barkåker–Tønsberg segment was prioritized second on the Vestfold Line, after a new passing loop at Nykirke. National Transport Plan 2002–11 proposed that construction start in 2005, but by November 2002, the National Rail Administration delayed the plans, following investment cuts by Bondevik's Second Cabinet. In response, Minister of Transport Torild Skogsholm stated that she was considering financing the project as a public–private partnership paid through a surcharge on tickets fares.

The route will give a time saving of between three and four minutes for trains heading north of Tønsberg, but two minutes of these will be saved by changing the direction the trains run through the loop through town. Thus, passengers traveling southwards from Tønsberg experience a two-minute increase in travel time. The plan to make an isolated investment in the Barkåker–Tønsberg section was criticized by several pro-railway interest organizations, including Norsk Bane, For Jernbane, the Norwegian Society for the Conservation of Nature as well as the Norwegian State Railways (NSB)—who operates the train service. All recommended that the National Rail Administration place the investments on hold until more of the Vestfold Line was planned. NSB's Tom Ingulstad called the plans "troublesome" and stated that the trains would have nearly no time or reliability-gains from the investment. If the authority instead had built more double track in connection with the existing segment at Sande, trains could more efficiently catch up any delays before reaching Drammen.

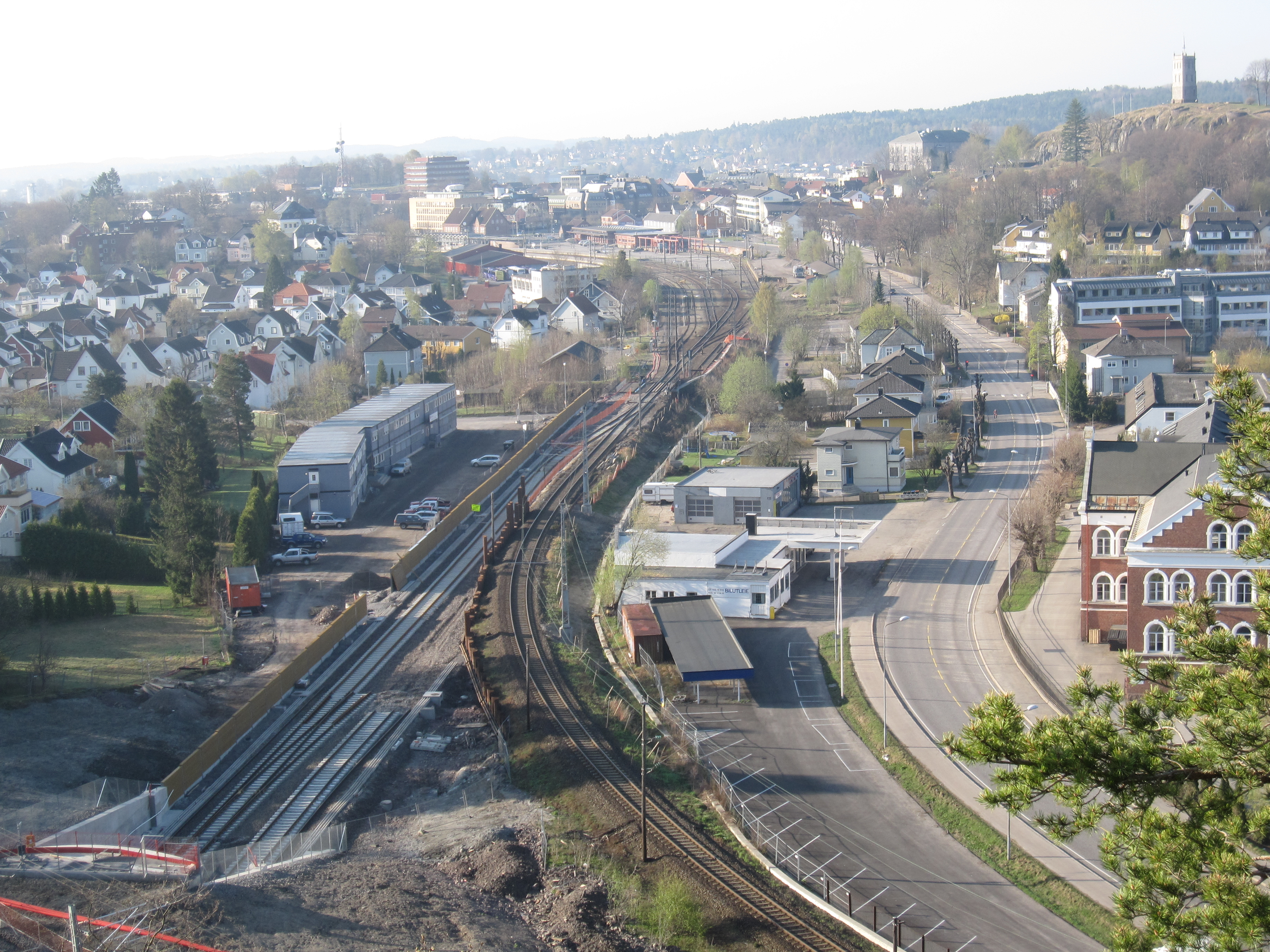
The southern entrance to the Jarlsberg Tunnel down to the left looking towards Tønsberg Station

Long-term plans for the line imply that the line will need to allow a through speed of at least 250 kilometers per hour (160 mph) and be built so trains do not need to stop or slow down at all stations. The National Rail Administration had at the time of construction not made any plans for a route south of Tønsberg; estimates from Norsk Bane show that Tønsberg will not be able to allow high through speeds and that a new through line would have to be built with a different right-of-way, entirely avoiding the Jarlsberg Tunnel. Alternatively, the route would have to feature slow speeds or large encroachments on the local environment. By binding the Vestfold Line to run via Barkåker, it is not possible to build a high-speed line with stations serving population centers such as Horten, Åsgårdstrand and Eik. For Jernbane advised against building the Barkåker–Tønsberg segment and instead recommended that the authorities wait until the entire Vestfold Line was planned.

Following the appointment of Stoltenberg's Second Cabinet in 2005, the government started working with longer projects and increased funding. The go-ahead for the project was given by Minister of Transport Liv Signe Navarsete on 31 March 2008, with the entire project from Barkåker to Tønsberg estimated to cost 1.37 billion Norwegian krone (NOK). The main civil engineering advisor for the project was Norconsult. Six bids were issued to building the main segment, which included the tunnel and 2.6 kilometers (1.6 mi) from Tomsbakken to Barkåker Industrial Park. The bidders were a joint venture between Reinertsen and Leonard Nilsen, Veidekke, Skanska, Hæhre Entreprenør, NCC and Mika. The contract was awarded on 5 March 2009 to Reinertsen/Leonard Nilsen, who had the lowest bid, NOK 377.9 million, NOK 158 million less than the most expensive, from Mika. The joint venture was structured so Leonard Nilsen built the tunnel and Reinertsen the above-ground section.

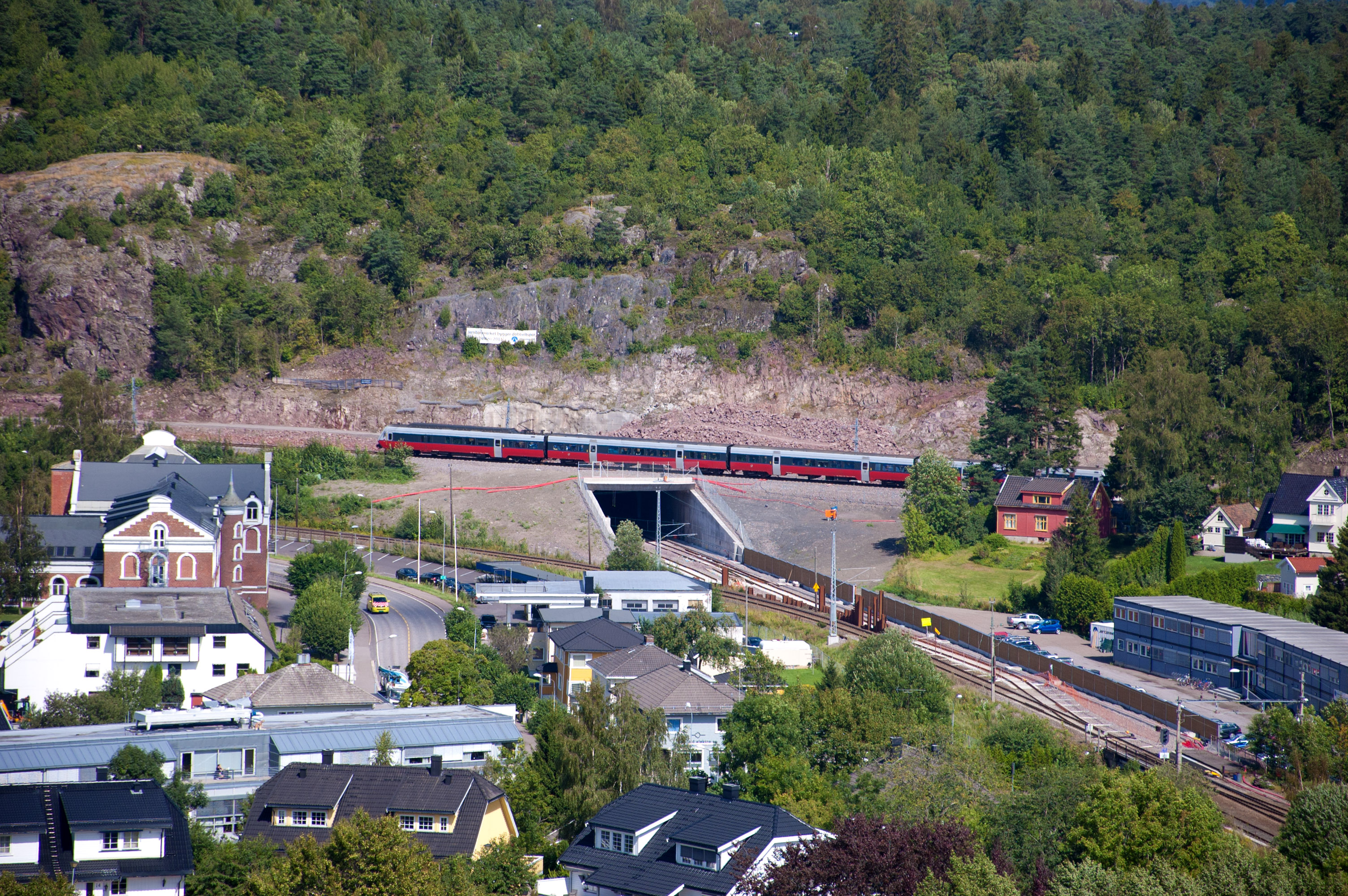
The southern entrance in August 2011, with a Class 70 train running along the old section of the Vestfold Line

Construction of the project started on 16 March 2009; work on the tunnel started in April and the first blasting began on 11 May. Construction ran from a crosscut in the center of the tunnel and outwards; average speed was 35 to 40 meters (115 to 131 ft) per week. Work on casting the concrete portals started on 18 September. For four weeks, starting in January 2010, blasting was performed above the Frodeåsen Tunnel, and on each occasion that the 100 or so blasts were executed, the road was closed for safety reasons. Following a public naming competition, the National Rail Administration announced on 5 February 2010 that the tunnel be known as the Jarlsberg Tunnel. The first breakthrough of the tunnel was achieved on 30 June 2010. The second and final breakthrough took place on 1 September. Construction proceeded without any injuries and nearly without any complications. The tunneling resulted in 235,000 tonnes (231,000 long tons; 259,000 short tons) of earthwork, which was used to build the above-ground section north of the tunnel. The last concrete casting was laid on 20 January 2011.

Laying of the track was performed by Wiebe, signaling was installed by Norsk Jernbanedrift, Structon Rail installed the overhead wire, and YIT installed the power supply and telecommunications systems. The tunnel has the NSI-63 relay-based signaling system, although it was scheduled to be replaced by European Rail Traffic Management System shortly after 2015. The last six weeks before opening, the Vestfold Line was closed to allow the new and old sections to be connected. This was the most hectic part of construction, as it saw the tracks south of the tunnel be rearranged to allow trains to operate the opposite direction through the loop in Tønsberg. The work was performed by Reinertsen and took 100,000 man-hours.

The tunnel and the segment Barkåker–Tønsberg opened on schedule on 7 November 2011. The segment cost NOK 1.5 billion, which was within budget. However, at the time of the opening, double track was still not laid from the tunnel to Tønsberg Station. Previously, trains crossed each other at the passing loop at the closed Barkåker Station, with one train having to wait for the other. With the competition of the new segment, trains could pass at any point between Tønsberg and Barkåker, allowing increased reliability. However, the signaling system was not installed at the time of opening, so the tunnel remained only operated with single track, although a temporary signaling system allowed it to be used as a passing loop. If used as such, speed was limited to 70 kilometers per hour (43 mph).
