= Achicourt station =

Closed French train station

Acichourt
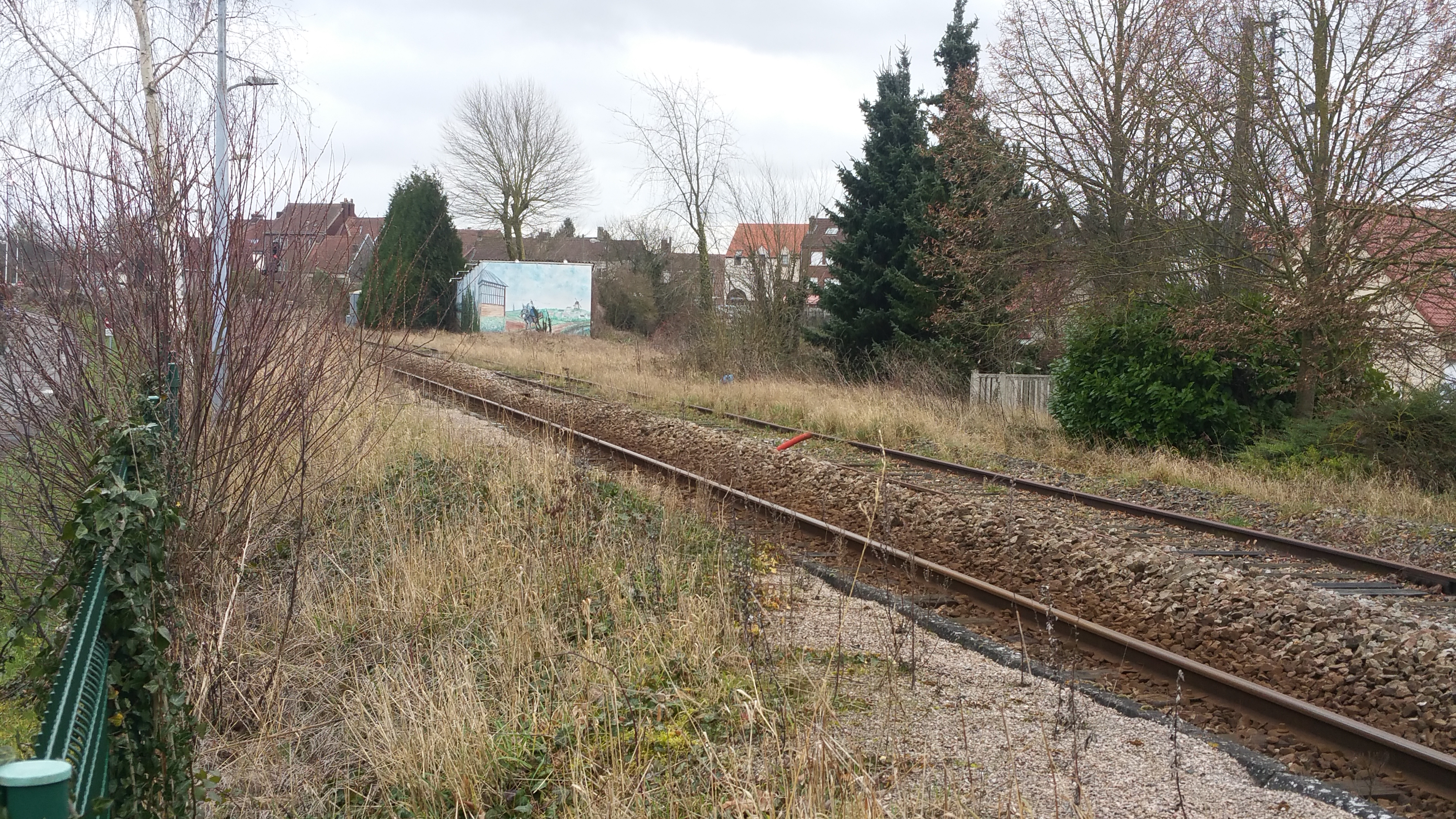
- Old quay, partially covered by weeds.

General information
- Location: Achicourt commune, Pas-de-Calais; France
- Coordinates: 50°16′41″N 2°45′43″E
- Elevation: 70 m (230 ft)
- Lines: From Doullens to Arras station From Arras to Saint-Pol-sur-Ternoise station
- Platforms: 1
- Tracks: 2

Other information
- Station code: 87342154

History
- Opened: 1910
- Closed: 2011
Location
- Location within Pas-de-Calais

The Achicourt station is a closed French train station on the Arras to Saint-Pol-sur-Ternoise line, located in the commune of Achicourt, in the Pas-de-Calais department, in the Hauts-de-France administrative region.

A simple bifurcation station put into service in 1876 by the Compagnie des chemins de fer du Nord, when the Doullens to Arras line was opened, it was completed by a passenger station in 1910; the latter was destroyed during the First and Second World Wars. Until its closure in 2011, it was a stopover of the Société nationale des chemins de fer français (SNCF), served by TER Nord-Pas-de-Calais trains.

== Railway location ==
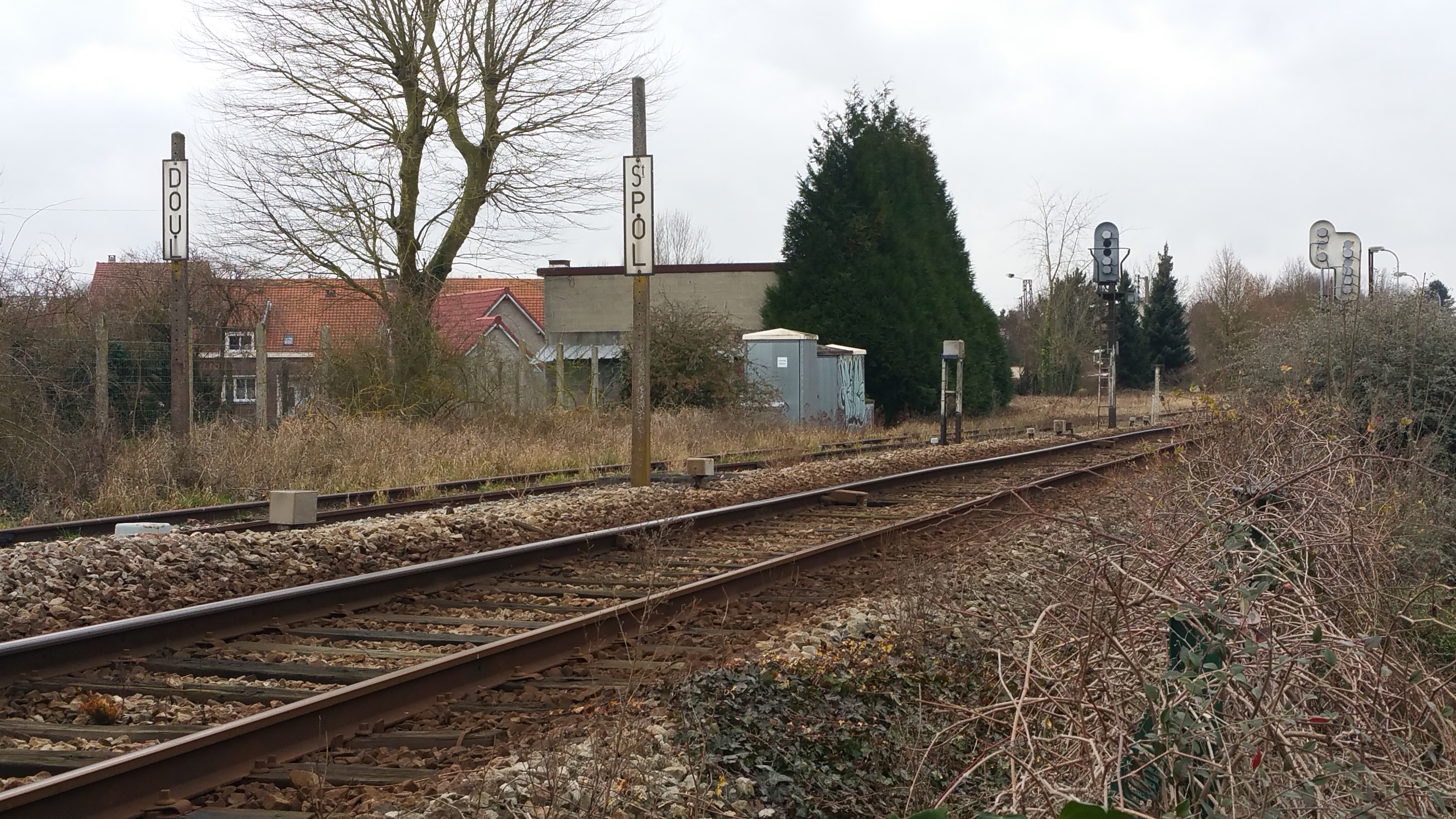
Single tracks for both lines (with signs for Saint-Pol and Doullens), shortly ahead of the station.

Established at an altitude of 70 meters, Achicourt station is located at kilometric point (KP) 192.740 of the Arras to Saint-Pol-sur-Ternoise line, between the open stations of Arras and Marœuil.

It is also located at KP 78.005 - between the closed Wailly station and the open Arras station - on the Doullens to Arras line, twinned with the first line between the Arras station and a point 2.24 km west-southwest of the Achicourt station.

== History ==
The Achicourt bifurcation, on the line from Arras to Saint-Pol-sur-Ternoise, went into service on May 15, 1876, when the Compagnie des chemins de fer du Nord (Nord) opened its line from Doullens to Arras.

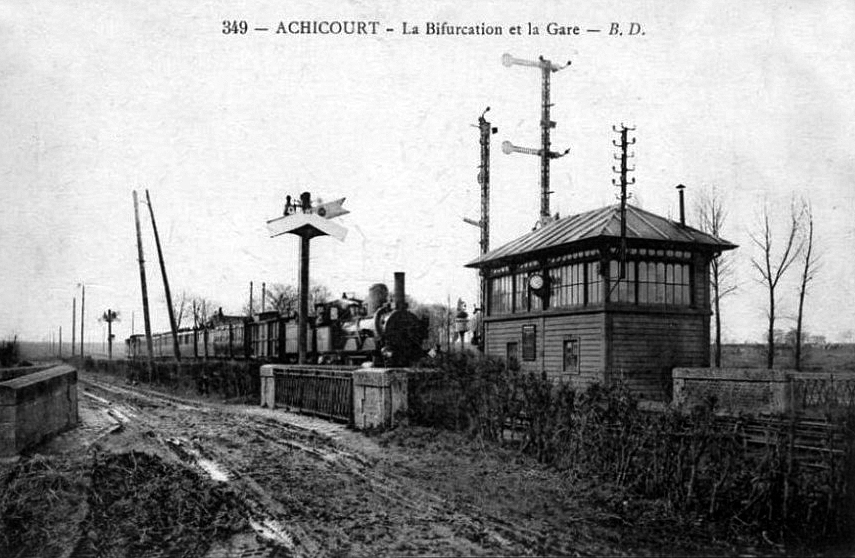
The Achicourt fork and halt at the beginning of the twentieth century, before World War I.

At its meeting on August 18, 1909, the Departmental Council of Pas-de-Calais passed a motion, forwarded to the administration, for the establishment of a halt at Achicourt, at the junction of the Arras to Saint-Pol and Doullens to Arras lines. The councillors argued that trains already stopped for service at the bifurcation. What's more, the industrial revolution was transforming the commune of Achicourt: the proportion of peasants was falling, and railway workers were settling in the commune following the opening of the Paris-Lille line and Arras station in 1846. In a dispatch dated November 21, 1909, the Minister of Public Works informed the Prefect that he was awaiting the outcome of negotiations between the municipality and the Compagnie du Nord before submitting the creation of a stopping point in Achicourt for consideration.

The municipality of Achicourt and the Compagnie du Nord reached an agreement that included the municipality taking over the financing of the project, which voted a subsidy of 4,120 Francs on March 10, 1910. The company set up the stop near the bifurcation station, with two platforms, each 100 meters long.

At its meeting on May 18, 1914, the departmental assembly once again took an interest in this stopover, following a proposal by general councillor Jean Paris. Noting that all trains on the Arras - Doullens and Arras - Saint-Pol routes stopped at the junction for service purposes, but that a large number did not serve the stop, he asked that a new timetable be studied so that all these passenger trains could be made available to travelers likely to use the stop. The General Council adopted a resolution to forward this proposal to the Administration for study.

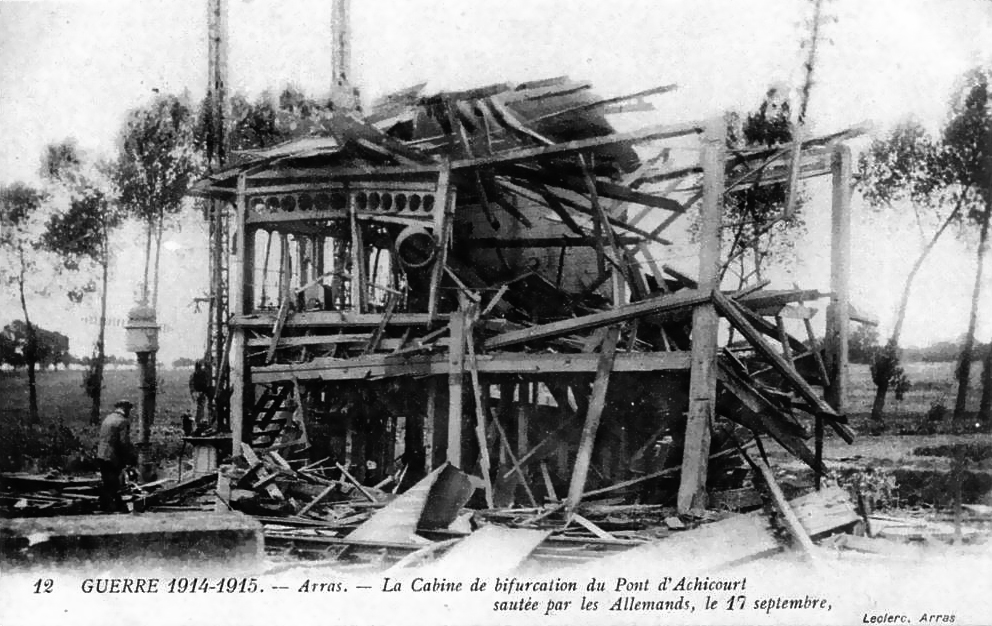
The bifurcation post destroyed by the explosion of September 17, 1914.

At the outbreak of World War I, the bifurcation station and rest stop were destroyed when the nearby bridge over the Crinchon was blown up by the Germans on the night of September 16-17, 1914. After the war, the commune twice asked for the station to be reopened, first in 1919 and then in 1925, because of the size of its population (4,000) and its proximity to Arras. Reconstruction of the railway installations led to the construction of several railway housing estates between 1921 and 1925 (on the initiative of Raoul Dautry) to accommodate the workforce, including the Pierre Semard housing estate near the stop.

In 1927, the Compagnie du Nord rejected this request, arguing that before the war, the stop coincided with the railway junction. However, the latter, destroyed in 1914, was rebuilt in a new location that no longer corresponded to that of the halt. The company therefore considered that imposing two stops would be impossible to manage the traffic service, which required very strict timetables for crossing trains. The company confirmed its repeated refusal of this request.

Nevertheless, the municipality succeeded in convincing, as a preliminary project for the reconstruction of the station was presented, and on January 29, 1930, a decree authorized the levying of surcharges to finance the work, which was completed that same year. During the reconstruction, the platforms at the stop were fifty meters longer than before 1914 - to take account of the greater length of trains - and the local authority installed incandescent lighting. Service was resumed, and in May 1936, the Achicourt "stop" was served by five round trips on the Arras - Doullens route, between Arras and the Wailly stop.

It became part of the SNCF network in 1938, when the latter was created. The line to Doullens was closed to passengers the same year, with a brief reopening during World War II (from September 1, 1940 to May 5, 1941). The station was again destroyed during the war, before being put back into service. With only one of the two single-track lines running through it, one of the side platforms was removed.

From October to November 2000, a mural was painted by artists from a local association. Inaugurated on December 16 of the same year, in the presence of delegates from the municipality and the SNCF, the mural depicted the former station, as well as the Arras - Saint-Pol - Boulogne rail link of 1876.

Served by TER Nord-Pas-de-Calais trains, it was closed in 2011, when new timetables were introduced.

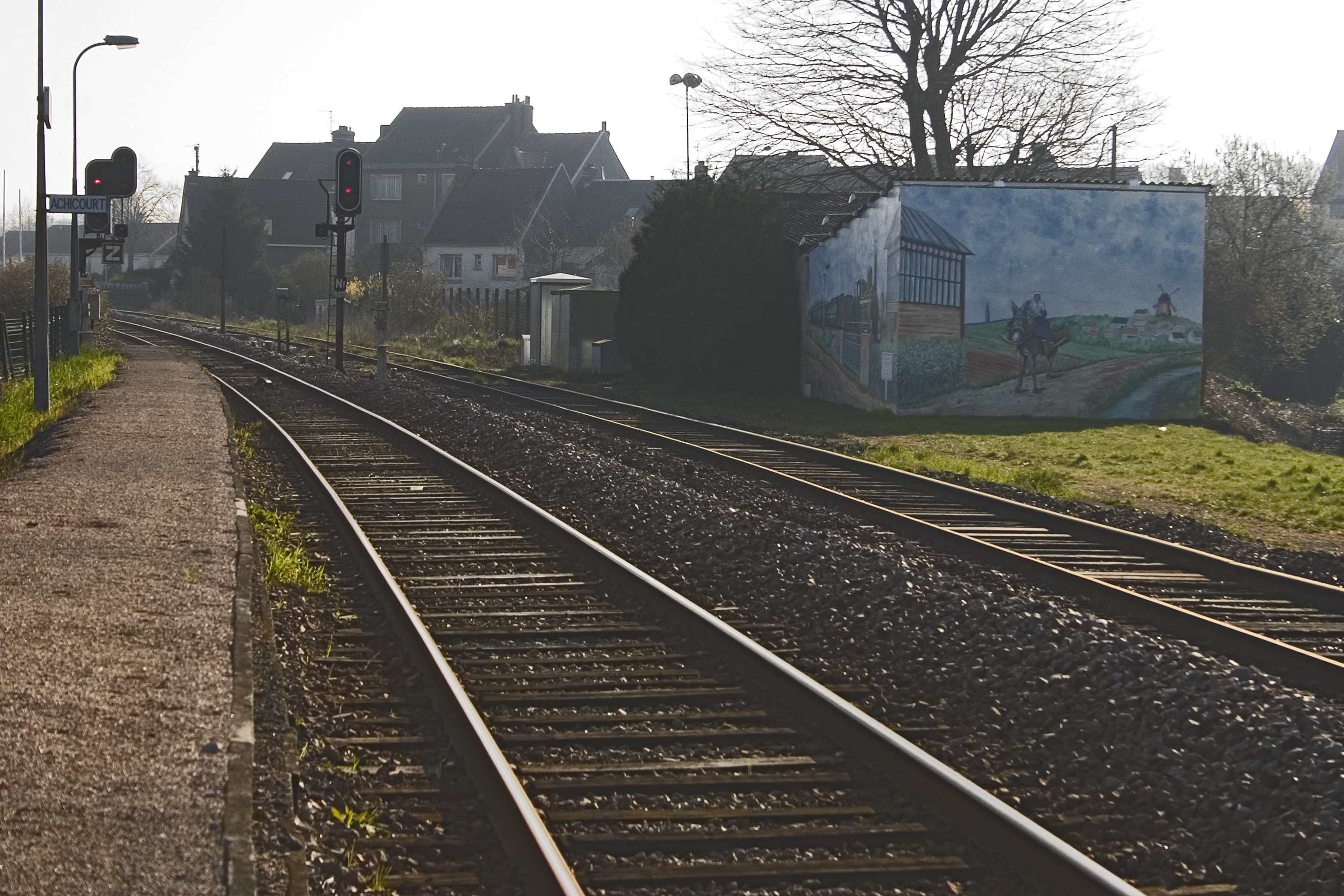
The halt viewed in 2008, when it was still in service.

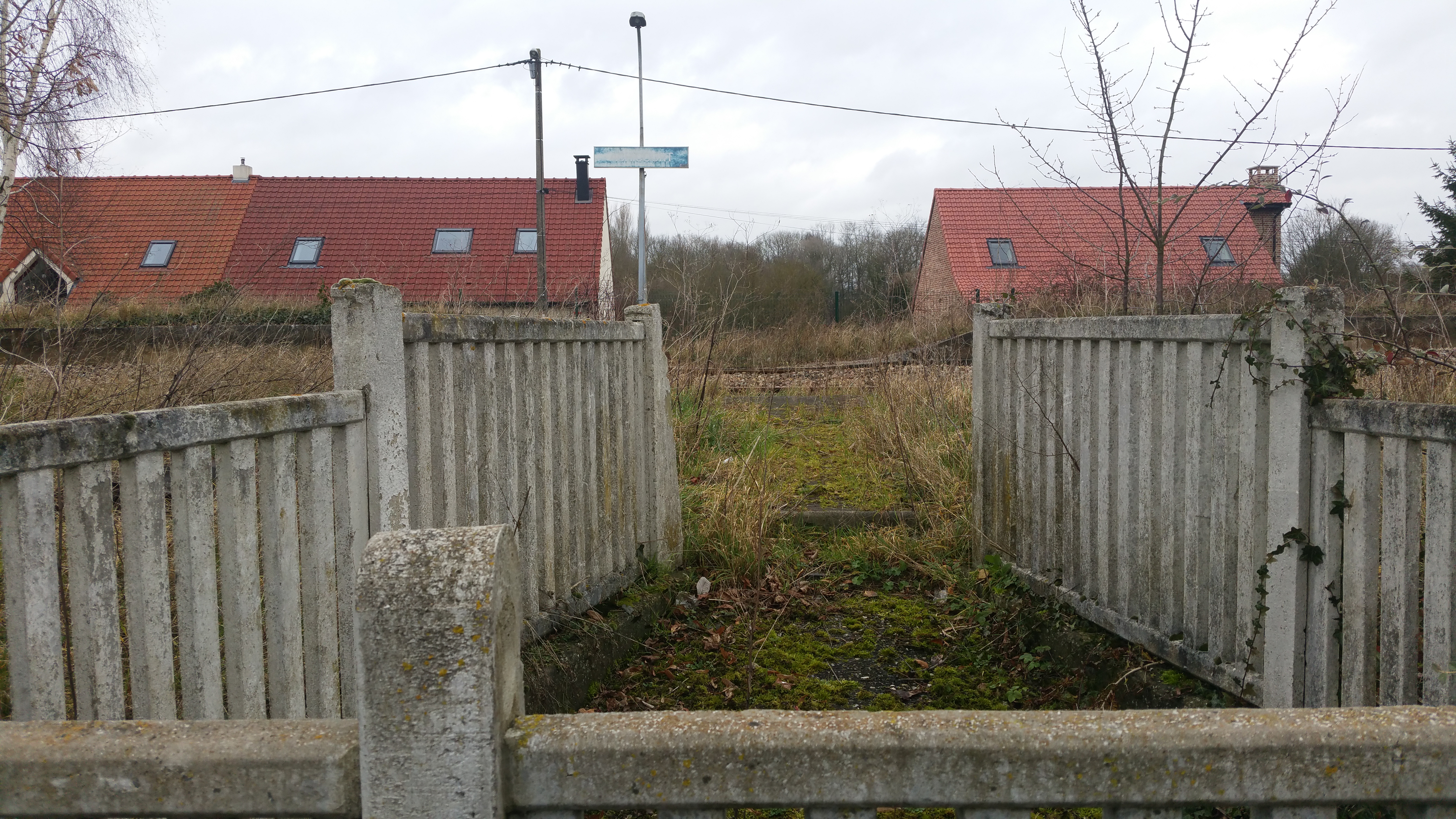
The old platform access, as it was in February 2016. As the latter is located on the other side of the tracks, it was necessary to cross them by means of a Public Track Crossing (no longer in use).

== See also ==
- List of SNCF stations
- List of SNCF stations in Hauts-de-France
- Template:Paris-Lille railway diagram

== Bibliography ==
- Banaudo, J. (1982). "Doullens - Achicourt (Arras)". l'État - le Nord - les Ceintures. Trains oubliés (in French). Vol. 4. Menton: Éditions du Cabri. pp. 160–162. ISBN 2-903310-24-6.
