= Frodeåsen =

Hill in Tønsberg, Norway

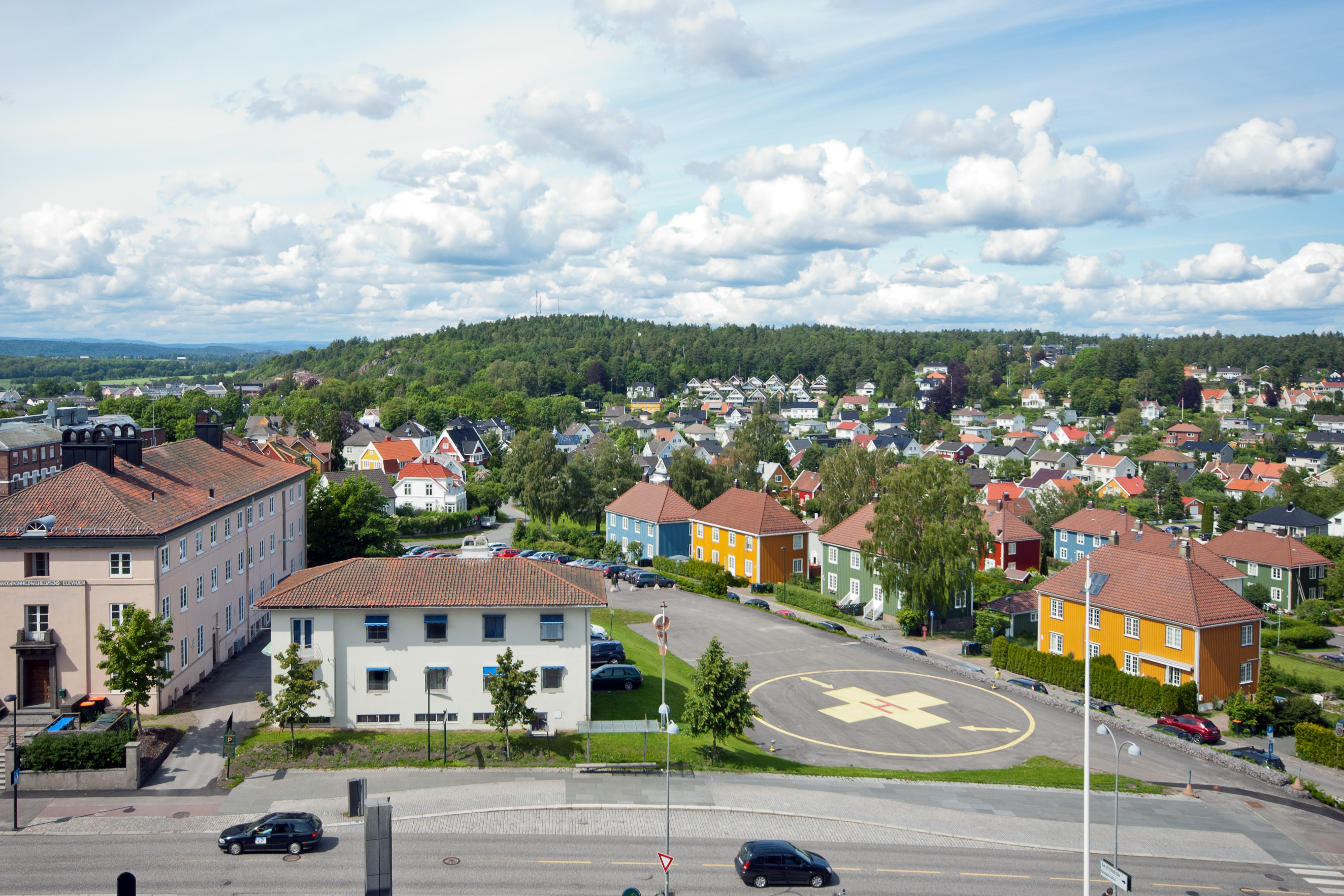
- Frodeåsen in the background as seen from Tønsberg Hospital

Highest point
- Elevation: 75 m (246 ft)
- Coordinates: 59°16′58″N 10°24′23″E

Geography
- Location within Vestfold Location within Norway
- Location: Vestfold, Norway

Frodeåsen is a hill on the northwestern edge town of Tønsberg in Tønsberg Municipality in Vestfold county, Norway. Reaching 75 meters (246 ft) above mean sea level, it serves largely as a recreational area for the local residents.

Two tunnels run through the hill: the 1.75-kilometer (1.09 mi) long Jarlsberg Tunnel of the Vestfold Line railway and the Frodeåsen Tunnel on County Road 300.
