= Achicourt =

Achicourt Kortaken
- Commune
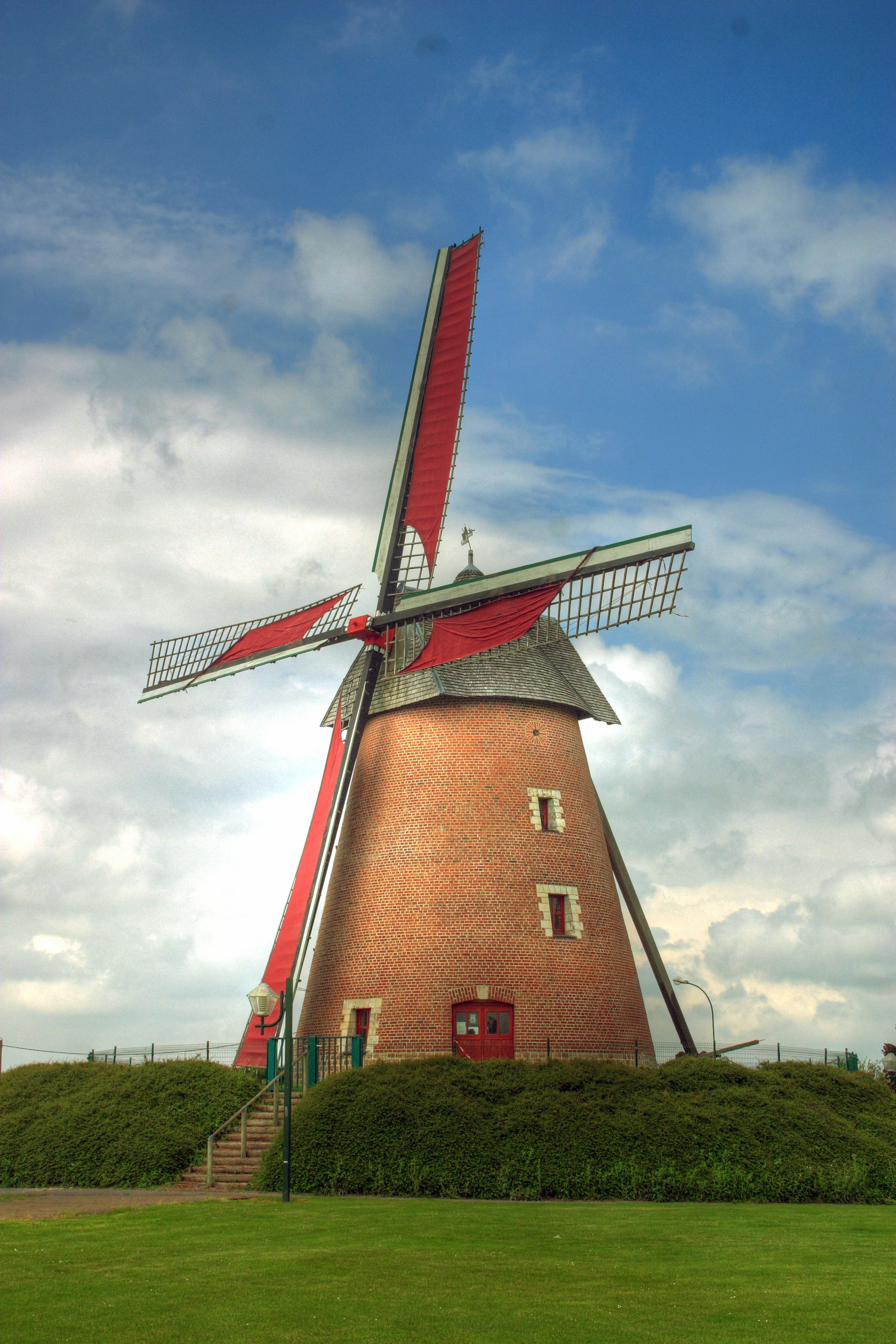
- The windmill of Achicourt

- Coat of arms
- Location of Achicourt
- Location within France Location within Hauts-de-France
- Coordinates: 50°16′27″N 2°45′37″E
- Country: France
- Region: Hauts-de-France
- Department: Pas-de-Calais
- Arrondissement: Arras
- Canton: Arras-3
- Intercommunality: Arras

Government
  - Mayor (2023–2026): Patrick Lemaire
- Area^{1}: 5.94 km^{2} (2.29 sq mi)
- Elevation: 72 m (236 ft)
- Highest elevation: 101 m (331 ft)
- Lowest elevation: 60 m (200 ft)
- Population (2023): 7,873
  - Density: 1,330/km^{2} (3,430/sq mi)
- Time zone: UTC+01:00 (CET)
  - Summer (DST): UTC+02:00 (CEST)
- INSEE/Postal code: 62004 /62217
- ^{1} French Land Register data, which excludes lakes, ponds, glaciers > 1 km^{2} (0.386 sq mi or 247 acres) and river estuaries.

Achicourt (French pronunciation: [aʃikuʁ]; West Flemish: Kortaken; Picard: Hachicourt) is a commune in the Pas-de-Calais department in northern France.

== Geography ==
A light industrial suburb of Arras located 2 miles (3 km) southwest of Arras, at the D3 and D5 road junction. The river Crinchon flows through the town. Achicourt station was closed in 2011.

== Population ==
Historical population
Year	Pop.	±% p.a.
1968	5,188	—
1975	7,433	+5.27%
1982	7,795	+0.68%
1990	7,959	+0.26%
1999	7,695	−0.37%
2007	7,625	−0.11%
2012	7,954	+0.85%
2017	7,799	−0.39%
2023	7,873	+0.16%
Source: INSEE

== Sights ==
- The old windmill, rebuilt in 1994.
- The church of St.Vaast, dating from the twentieth century.
- The church of St.Christophe, dating from the twentieth century.
- Traces of a rectangular castle motte from the thirteenth century.
- The British war cemetery, where 131 English and Canadian soldiers are buried.

== See also ==
- Communes of the Pas-de-Calais department
