= Winters Brothers (disambiguation) =

Winters Brothers is an American company.

Winters Brothers may also refer to:

- Mike and Bernie Winters, British comedians
- Robert and Thomas Wintour, Gunpowder plotters
- The Winters Brothers Band, American Southern Rock band
- Johnny Winter and Edgar Winter, American musicians and brothers

== See also ==
- Winter Brothers, 2017 Danish-Icelandic drama film
