= 1910 in rail transport =

This article lists events related to rail transport that occurred in 1910.

== Events ==
=== January events ===
- January 1 – American railroad companies in the South, by agreement with the Brotherhood of Railway Trainmen, implement a quota against hiring of African Americans in a larger percentage than are employed on this date.
- January 3 – Tired of its cars being routed to the Boston and Maine Railroad by mistake, the Brookville and Mahoning Railroad of Pennsylvania changes its name to the Pittsburg and Shawmut Railroad.
- January 21 – Spanish River derailment: Canadian Pacific Railway's westbound Soo Express passenger train derails as it crosses the bridge over the Spanish River in Northern Ontario, Canada, killing 44 people.
- January 22 – Rebuilt Flinders Street railway station in Melbourne, Australia, officially opened.

=== February events ===
- February 24 – The Cleveland Short Line Railway, a subsidiary of the Lake Shore and Michigan Southern Railway, opens its first 9.73-mile (15.66 km) section of track from Rockport to Marcy, Ohio, and a junction with the Lake Erie and Pittsburg Railway.

=== March events ===
- March 1 – The Wellington, Washington avalanche sweeps away two Great Northern Railway passenger trains in the Cascade Mountains, killing 96, making it the worst snowslide accident in United States history.
- March 4 – Rogers Pass avalanche kills 62 Canadian Pacific Railway workers clearing the line near the summit of Rogers Pass, making it the worst snowslide accident in Canadian history.
- March 10 – The Minoh Arima Electric Railway line, Umeda Station of Osaka to Takarazuka Station route, is officially completed in Japan. (as predecessor of the Hankyu Takarazuka Line).

=== April events ===
- April 2 – Butzbach-Licher Eisenbahn in Germany opens the section from Bad Nauheim to Rockenberg.
- April 5 – Opening of the Argentine Transandino Railway, a metre gauge mountain railway partly using the Abt rack system, from Los Andes, Chile, to Mendoza, Argentina, a distance of 251 km (156 mi), rising to a height of about 3,200 m (10,500 ft) at the summit tunnel and utilising Kitson Meyer locomotives.

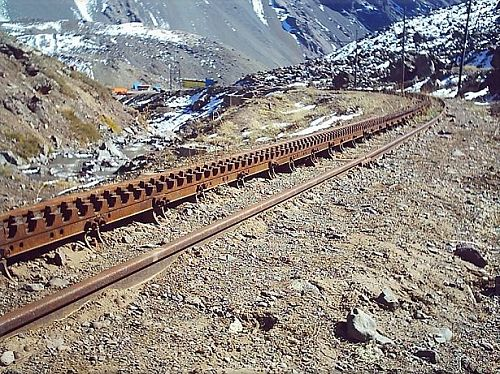
Argentine Transandino Railway

=== May events ===
- May 31 – The Union of South Africa is established and with it the Colonial Government railways, the Cape Government Railways, the Natal Government Railways and the Central South African Railways are merged to form South African Railways.

=== June events ===
- June 6 – The US Railroad Safety Appliance Act of 1893 is further extended to mandate that no less than 85% of all railroad cars in an operating train must be equipped with air brakes.

=== July events ===
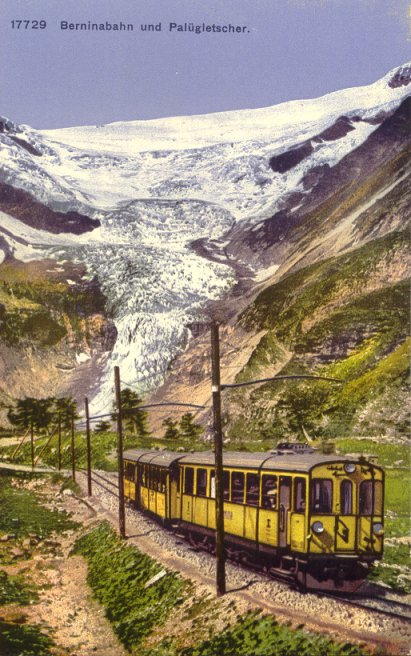
Bernina Railway

- July 5 – Opening of Bernina Railway (metre gauge, electrified) from St. Moritz, Switzerland, to Tirano, Italy, crossing the Alps at the highest altitude of a through railway in Europe, 2,257 m (7,405 ft).
- July 11 – Construction begins on the Sheridan Railway in Sheridan, Wyoming.
- July 18 – A passenger train traveling through dense fog hits a stationary locomotive in Richmond, Victoria, Australia, killing nine people on the moving train.
- July 26 – The London and South Western Railway introduces a new Continental service, Southampton-Havre.

=== August events ===
- August 10 – The Mill Mountain Incline funicular in Roanoke, Virginia, opens for service.
- August 22 – The first Western Pacific Railroad passenger train to operate over the railroad's entire route from Salt Lake City, Utah, arrives in San Francisco, California.

=== September events ===
- September 21 – A Fort Wayne and Wabash Valley Traction interurban car overruns a meeting point at Kingsland, Indiana, and smashes head on into a northbound interurban. Forty-one people are killed in the worst accident of the interurban era.

=== October events ===
- October 1 – The Great Western Railway of England, abolishes second-class rail fares (first- and third-class remain).
- October 10 – The Kowloon-Canton Railway (British Section) opens in Hong Kong.

=== November events ===
- November 27 – The Pennsylvania Railroad opens Pennsylvania Station in New York City together with Manhattan Transfer station and the New Jersey side of the railroad's Hudson River tunnels (built by the Pennsylvania Tunnel and Terminal Railroad).

=== December events ===
- December 24 – The Hawes Junction train disaster in Cumbria, England, occurs when a busy signalman forgets about a pair of bank engines which have been waiting at his starting signal and allows an express train into the same block section. Twelve people are killed in the resulting collision and fire.

=== Unknown date events ===
- The city of Cleveland, Ohio, approves a bond measure to pay for the Nickel Plate Road's grade separation project through the densest part of the city.
- Finnish Railways opens Lanskaya Station in Saint Peterburg, Russia after restructuring by the architect Bruno Granholm.
- The Yunnan metre gauge railway in China is completed from Laokay to Yunnan-fu by French interests.
- First section of Moçâmedes Railway opens in Portuguese Angola.
- Carillon and Grenville Railway closes, the last broad (5' 6") gauge line in Canada.

== Births ==
=== February births ===
- February 27 – Francesco di Majo, designer of the Pendolino (died 2011).

=== May births ===
- May 21 – Robert W. Richardson, American railroad historian (died 2007).

== Deaths ==
=== March deaths ===
- March 7 – George Whale, Chief Mechanical Engineer of London and North Western Railway 1903–1909 (born 1842).
- March 24 – Gaston du Bousquet, French steam locomotive designer (born 1839).

=== July deaths ===
- July 20 – Ira G. Rawn, vice president of Illinois Central Railroad until 1909, president of Monon Railroad 1909-1910, dies from an allegedly self-inflicted gunshot wound (born 1855).

=== August deaths ===
- August 2 – Inoue Masaru, Japanese bureaucrat, first Director of Railways, dies on visit to London (born 1843).
