= Smørstein Tunnel =

Tunnel at Smørstein in Holmestrand, Norway

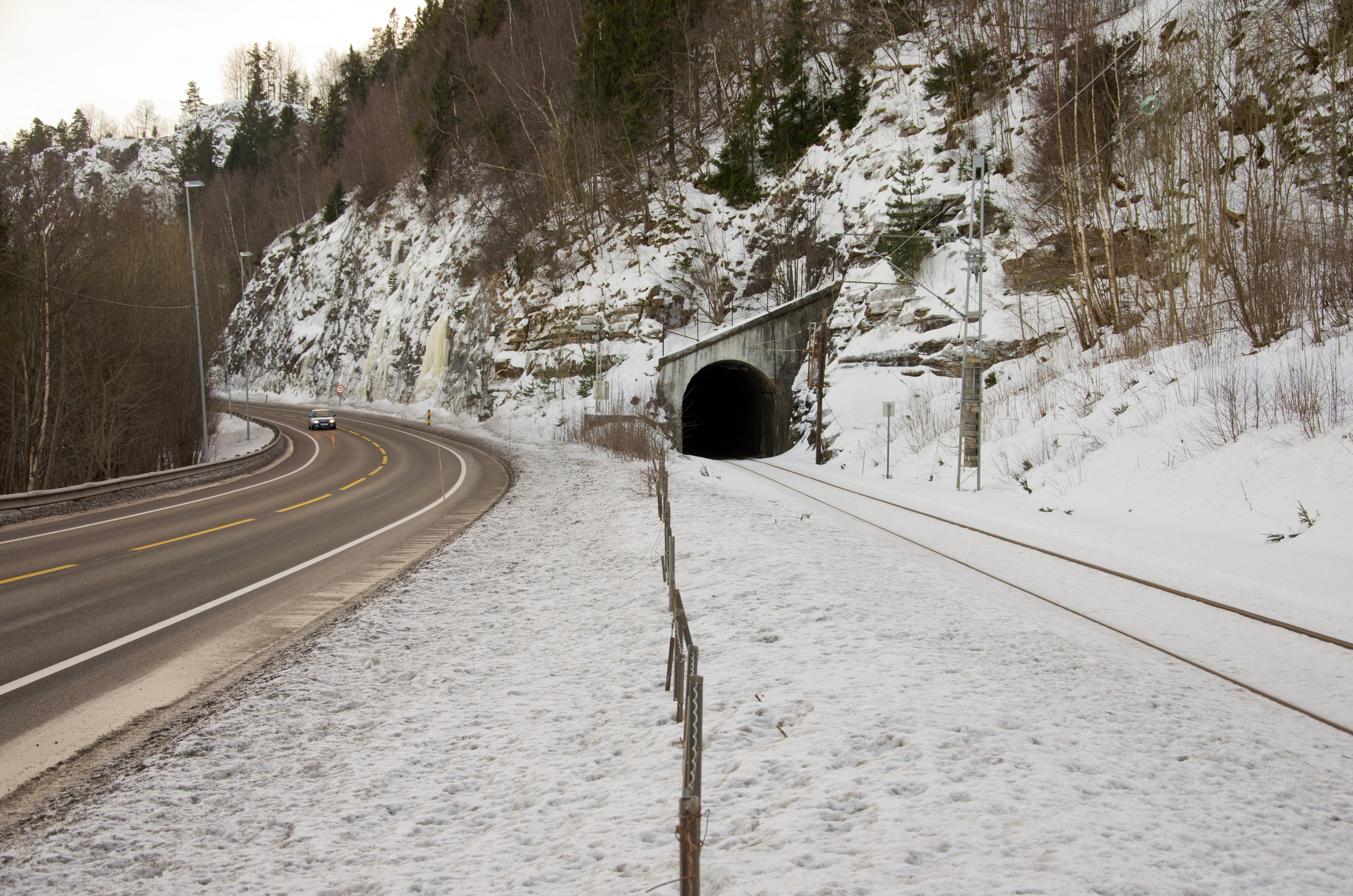
- The northern entrance, County Road 313 to the left
- Interactive map of Smørstein Tunnel

Overview
- Line: Vestfold Line
- Location: Smørstein, Holmestrand Municipality, Norway
- Coordinates: 59.5254°N 10.2803°E
- Status: converted to bike path

Operation
- Opened: 25 May 1921
- Closed: 28 November 2016
- Owner: Norwegian National Rail Administration

Technical
- Line length: 288 m (945 ft)
- No. of tracks: Single
- Track gauge: 1,435 mm (4 ft 8 1/2 in)
- Electrified: 15 kV 16.7 Hz AC
- Operating speed: 200 km/h (120 mph)

The Smørstein Tunnel is a 288-meter (945 ft) tunnel located at Smørstein in Holmestrand Municipality, Norway. The tunnel carried a single, electrified track of the Vestfold Line. The need for a tunnel arose after a 19 August 1918 landslide washed away the railway past Smørstein. A temporary track was in place from 28 October, but the Norwegian State Railways (NSB) determined that the geology was too unstable and thus decided to build a tunnel to avoid the poor geological conditions. The tunnel opened on 25 May 1921 and was until 2010 the only tunnel on the Vestfold Line between Drammen Station and Larvik Station. The tunnel was closed in 2016 with the opening of the Holmestrandsporten tunnel, and converted to a bicycle tunnel along with the rest of the old railway line.

== Specifications ==
The Smørstein Tunnel runs through the hill of Smørstein in Holmestrand, Norway. The 288-meter (945 ft) tunnel is single track and electrified at 15 kV 16.7 Hz AC. The tunnel is located next to County Road 313. It constitutes part of the Vestfold Line, owned by the Norwegian National Rail Administration. The northern entrance of the tunnel is located at a milestone distance of 81.97 kilometers (50.93 mi) from Oslo, 1.86 kilometers (1.16 mi) from the closed station of Smørstein, which was in use from 1921 to 1978.

== History ==
The original railway line past Smørstein opened on 13 October 1881, following a route which ran closer to the fjord. During construction in 1880 the area had experienced a landslide which had nearly taken with it the permanent way.

In August 1918 the Norwegian State Railways (NSB) was working on building a level crossing at Smørstein as part of a realignment of a road. The earthwork from the construction was piled up close to the fjord. Its weight caused a landslide on 17 August, in which the masses slid into the fjord. This caused a series of successive smaller slides, each wave originating closer and closer to the railway tracks. All available maintenance of way crew were prescribed from the district. NSB originally operated trains past the section, but eventually chose to evacuate the trains while they ran past the site.

By the afternoon of the 18 August 4,000 cubic meters (140,000 cu ft) of earthwork had slid out. The slide area was 50 meters (160 ft) wide and larger and larger cracks were forming in the road. Small slides occurred at roughly fifteen-minute intervals. In the evening the head engineer on the site stopped all train traffic and operations were changed so there were trains operating at both sides of the slide. The smaller slides continued and in the morning of 19 August the land under the tracks had slid away, leaving the rails hanging in mid-air over a distance of 70 meters (230 ft). The guard house was evacuated and it was taken by the slide the following day. In all 12,000 to 15,000 cubic meters (420,000 to 530,000 cu ft) of earthwork had been carried away by then. When the slides finally had concluded after a month, nearly 30,000 cubic meters (1,100,000 cu ft) of earth had slid into the fjord. It was at the time the most extensive landslide to hit one of NSB's lines.

The slide caused problems for NSB to conduct operations on the line. At first the passengers walked past the site along an old animal path and onwards along an old carriage path. The shipping company Westergaard & Co was hired and they operated Færder, capable of 200 passengers, which ran between Framnæs and Bogen. Elderly and sick passengers were recommended to instead travel via the Moss–Horten Ferry. The run was later moved to Holmestrand, a distance of 4.7 kilometers (2.9 mi). Later the ferry SS Bastø 1 was hired, allowing an entire train load to be carried in one sailing.

Four hundred men, of which one hundred were soldiers, were brought in to rebuild the line. A summer home, Trollstua, was rented and used as head offices. A temporary station was erected north of the slide and temporary canteens and material sheds were built for the crew. Work ran through the evening. The geological surveys were led by Professor Brøgger, who concluded that the slide was caused by faults in the fjord. At first the work focused on constructing a new temporary line past the site. This allowed trains to pass the site from 28 October.

Construction then continued with the building of a tunnel, as the ground was considered too unstable to support railways. The Smørstein Tunnel opened on 25 May 1921, and was at the time the only tunnel on the Vestfold Line between Drammen Station and Larvik Station. The tunnel was electrified on 1 December 1957. It remained the only tunnel on the line north of Larvik until 2010, when the Jarlsberg Tunnel opened.

== Future ==
The National Rail Administration is in the process of upgrading the Vestfold Line to double track and high speed, which is scheduled to eventually see the replacement of all single-track sections of the line. Construction of the 14.1-kilometer (8.8 mi) Holm–Nykirke section, which is dominated by the 12.3-kilometer (7.6 mi) Holmestrandsporten tunnel, started on 16 August 2010 and is scheduled for completion in 2015. The new segment will replace the Vestfold Line on the section past Smørstein and the line and tunnel will be closed.
