= 2011 in rail transport =

This article lists events related to rail transport that occurred in 2011.

== Events ==
=== By month ===
==== January events ====
- 10 January – Regular through passenger service from Wuhan to Wanzhou over the complete new Yiwan Railway in China starts. The line features 288 km (179 mi) of bridges on a total length of 377 km (234 mi).

==== February events ====
- (United Kingdom) 19 February – First public passenger train operates throughout between Caernarfon and Porthmadog Harbour over the restored Welsh Highland Railway.
- (India) 23 February – Opening of the Airport Express Line in Delhi.
- (United States) (United Kingdom) 28 February – Wabtec announces that it has acquired Brush Traction, the English-based locomotive builder and maintainer, for US$31 million.

==== March events ====
- (Japan) 12 March – Kyushu Shinkansen opens between Hakata of Fukuoka and Shin-Yatsushiro, with Osaka and Kagoshima direct bullet train starting.
- (Japan) 27 March – The Sakuradori Line serving Nagoya is extended 4.2 km (2.6 mi) from Nonami to Tokushige.
- (South Korea) 30 March – In Busan, Line 4 of the Busan Metro opens for service connecting Minam and Anpyeong (10.8 km (6.7 mi)).

==== April events ====
- (China) (Germany) March–April – Eurasian Land Bridge test run from Chongqing to Duisburg (DB) via Alashankou crossing, Kazakhstan, Russia, Belarus, and Poland, covering 10,300 km (6,400 mi) in 16 days.
- (United States) April 17 – A BNSF Railway coal train rear-ends a maintenance-of-way train near Red Oak, Iowa, both crew members of the coal train were killed. The cause was the crew being half asleep.
- (Spain) 19 April – Zaragoza tram starts its commercial operation.

==== May events ====
- 1 May – Veendam railway station opens in the Netherlands.
- (United States) 1 May – Tide Light Rail begins service in Norfolk, Virginia.
- (United States) May 24 – a CSX Transportation intermodal train rear-ended a Union Pacific Railroad manifest train near Mineral Springs, North Carolina killing both CSX crew members. The cause was the crew of the CSX train passing a dark signal

==== June events ====
- (Germany) 6 June – Munich–Augsburg railway is upgraded to four-track.
- 16 June – An NSB Class 73 burns up after catching fire in a burning show shed at Hallingskeid Station on Norway's Bergen Line.
- (United States) 20 June – A-Train commuter rail service begins in northern Texas.
- (China) 22 June – Shenzhen Metro's Line 5 opens.
- (China) 28 June – Phase 2 of Shenzhen Metro Line 2 connecting Window of the World Station to Xinxiu Station opens for trial runs.
- (Azerbaijan) 29 June – The Green Line of the Baku Metro is extended from Azadliq prospekti to Darnagul.
- 30 June – Beijing-Shanghai High-Speed Railway opens in China.

==== July events ====
- 23 July – Wenzhou train collision: At least 39 people are killed when a China Railway High-speed train collides in rear with a preceding stationary train halted by a lightning strike, throwing two coaches off a viaduct close to Wenzhou in Zhejiang province.

==== August events ====
- (United States) 7 August – West Valley and Mid-Jordan extensions of TRAX open in the Salt Lake City, Utah, area.
- 15 August – The Gevingåsen Tunnel on Norway's Nordland Line opens.
- (Israel) 19 August – The first line of the Jerusalem Light Rail opens to passengers.
- 26 August – The Bærum Tunnel and section of track between Lysaker and Sandvika on Norway's Asker Line is taken into use.
- (United Kingdom) 31 August – Opening of Docklands Light Railway extension from Canning Town to the new Stratford International station, taking over the North London Line infrastructure (which closed on 9 December 2006) and linking the Docklands area with domestic and international high-speed services on High Speed 1 and with the 2012 Olympic Games site.

==== September events ====
- 9 September
  - (South Korea) – in Busan, the Busan–Gimhae Light Rail Transit Line opens for service.
  - (United Arab Emirates) – In Dubai, the Green Line opens for service.
- (United States) 27 September – Brookhaven Rail Terminal opened on Long Island, New York, a 28-acre facility for bulk commodities

==== October events ====
- 8 October
  - (Singapore) – The Circle MRT line becomes fully operational.
  - (France) – Paris Métro Line 8 is extended from Créteil–Préfecture to Pointe du Lac.
- (Japan) 15 October – JR East phases out 113 series.
- – Banihal-Qazigund railway tunnel (Pir Panjal Railway Tunnel) a part of its Udhampur – Srinagar – Baramulla rail link project, opened in October 2011, India's longest and Asia's second longest railway tunnel and reduced the distance between Quazigund and Banihal to only 11 km. The 10.96 km long railway tunnel, passes through the Pir Panjal Range of middle Himalayas in Jammu and Kashmir.

==== November events ====
- (Norway) 7 November – A new 7.8-kilometer (4.8 mi) segment of the Vestfold Line with double track between Barkåker and Tønsberg, including the Jarlsberg Tunnel, is taken into use.
- (United States) 8 November - The new 5000-Series rail cars (5001-5706), built by Bombardier Transportation of Plattsburgh, New York are placed in revenue service on the Chicago Transit Authority elevated-subway rail system.

==== December events ====
- (France) 11 December – SNCF opens LGV Rhin-Rhône.
- 11 December – Sassenheim railway station opens in the Netherlands.
- 28 December – Hangzhou Metro opens in China.

=== Unknown date events ===
- – China high-speed Rail faces with crisis after train crash. Several executions happen in governments, train speeds are reduced from 350 km/h to 300 km/h and from 250 km/h to 200 km/h. Expansion of high-speed corridors became uncertain, but will see the second boom in next few years.

== Industry awards ==
=== Japan ===
Awards presented by the Japan Railfan Club

- 2011 Blue Ribbon Award: Keisei Electric Railway AE series Skyliner EMU
- 2011 Laurel Prize: Tokyo Metro 16000 series EMU

=== North America ===
2011 E. H. Harriman Awards

Group	Gold medal	Silver medal	Bronze medal
A			
B			
C			
S&T			

Awards presented by Railway Age magazine

- 2011 Railroader of the Year: Wick Moorman (NS)
- 2011 Regional Railroad of the Year:
- 2011 Short Line Railroad of the Year:

=== United Kingdom ===
Train Operator of the Year

- 2011: South West Trains

== Deaths ==
- 15 January – Francesco di Majo, designer of the Pendolino (born 1910).
- 4 May – Richard Steinheimer, American railroad photographer, dies (b. 1929).
- 10 July – William D. Middleton, well-known American rail-transport writer (b. 1928).
- 29 July – Richard Marsh, Baron Marsh, chairman of British Rail 1971–1976, dies (b. 1928).
- 20 October – Roger Tallon, designer of the TGV (born 1929).
