= Winters Brothers =

American waste disposal company

Winters Bros.
- Type: Private Company
- Industry: Waste management
- Founded: 1950; 76 years ago
- Headquarters: West Babylon, NY
- Number of locations: 18
- Products: Dumpster rental, Recycling, Waste systems
- Number of employees: 500
- Subsidiaries: Oak Ridge
- Website: www.wintersbros.com

Winters Bros. is a privately held waste disposal business in the Northeast United States. Its headquarters are in West Babylon, New York; it currently serves the market of New York, but previously also served Connecticut, Florida and Vermont. It sells its recovered products worldwide. It is the largest waste management firm in Long Island. The firm has six recycling centers and twelve transfer stations.

== Acquisitions ==
Originally based in Long Island, in 2011, it purchased the 25 waste disposal companies formerly owned by James Galante to expand into the Connecticut market. In 2015, the firm acquired all the Connecticut and New York operations from Waste Management operations, and continues to service these regions under contract with WM. At various times, it purchased smaller waste management companies, the largest of which in the New York region being Progressive Waste Solutions, which Winters Bros. acquired in 2015.

== Facilities ==
Winters Bros. has its largest facility located in West Babylon, NY which handles recycling, transfers, and hauling. Other transfer stations and yards in New York are in Glen Cove, NY, Medford, NY, Old Bethpage, NY, Holtsville, NY and Yaphank, NY. Its two facilities in Connecticut are in Danbury and Shelton.

== Transportation ==
In New York, Winters Bros. utilizes the Bushwick Branch rail line under contract with the New York and Atlantic Railway via the Waste Management company's Varick Transfer Station. In Connecticut, it utilizes the Housatonic Railroad's Maybrook Line.

Winters Brothers affiliate Shamrock Rail acquired Brookhaven Rail LLC, the company responsible for rail operations at Brookhaven Rail Terminal in Yaphank, NY, in 2020. The terminal itself remains a separate entity. Winters Brothers plans to build a waste-to-rail transfer facility on an adjacent property.

== Equipment ==
Winters Bros. has a collection of over 200 vehicles, which include trucks for residential, commercial, industrial and construction pickups. Its normal trucks are equipped with robotic arms to collect trash bins and dumpsters without the need for workers to exit the vehicles. Flatbed trucks are used for special pickups that are too large for normal trucks, and hauling away construction waste.
