= Frodeåsen Tunnel =

Road tunnel in Tønsberg, Norway

Frodeåsen Tunnel Frodeåstunnelen
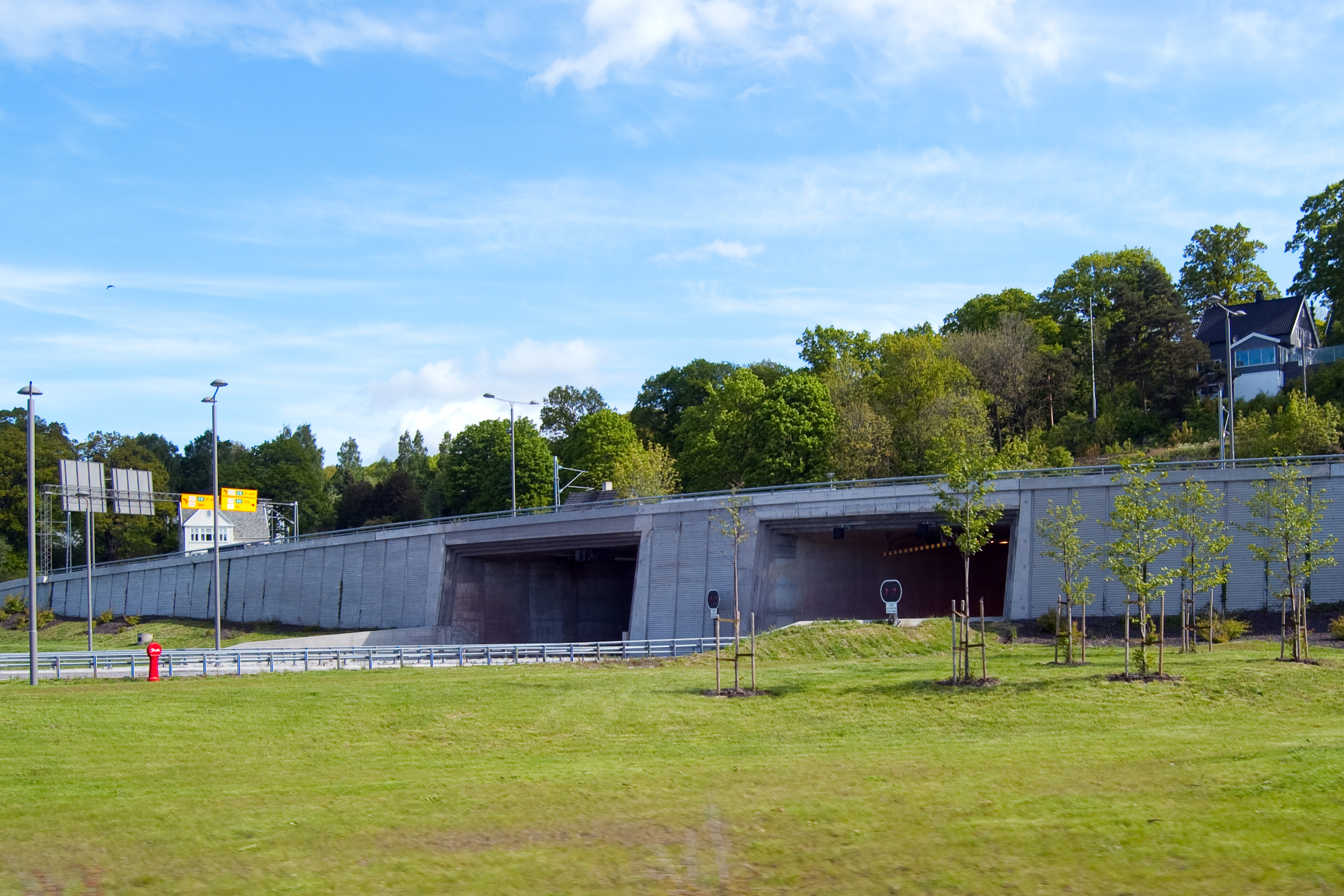
- Interactive map of Frodeåsen Tunnel; Frodeåstunnelen

Overview
- Location: Frodeåsen, Tønsberg, Norway
- Coordinates: 59°16′56″N 010°25′29″E
- Route: County Road 300
- Start: Kjelle
- End: Velle

Operation
- Opened: 13 March 2008
- Owner: Norwegian Public Roads Administration

Technical
- Length: 1,910 m (6,270 ft)

The Frodeåsen Tunnel (Norwegian: Frodeåstunnelen) is a 1,910-meter (6,270 ft) long twin-tube, four lane road tunnel in the town of Tønsberg in Tønsberg Municipality in Vestfold county, Norway. The tunnel is part of County Road 300, and it runs through the large hill Frodeåsen between Kjelle and Velle north of the city center. Built as part of the "Tønsberg Package", construction started on 28 October 2004 and the breakthrough was made on 9 March 2006. The tunnel and the new County Road 300 opened on 13 March 2008, creating a bypass road north of the town of Tønsberg.
