= Brookhaven Rail Terminal =

Truck-train trans-load facility on Long Island, New York

Coordinates: 40.82283°N 72.939895°W

Overview
- Reporting mark: USRNY
- Locale: Long Island
- Dates of operation: 2011–Present

Technical
- Track gauge: 4 ft 8 1/2 in (1,435 mm) standard gauge

Other
- Website: www.brookhavenrailterminal.com

The Brookhaven Rail Terminal (BRT) is a truck-train trans-load facility in Yaphank in Brookhaven on Long Island, New York. The 28-acre (11 ha) initial site was built with $40 million in private funds and opened on September 27, 2011. It was projected to take 40,000 long haul trucks off Long Island roads and handle 1 million tons of freight a year by 2016. It includes 13,000 feet (4 km) of new track, with three tracks for construction material, such as asphalt and concrete, and six tracks for merchandise, such as flour and biodiesel. As of 2021, it handles 300,000 tons of products per year.

== Operations ==
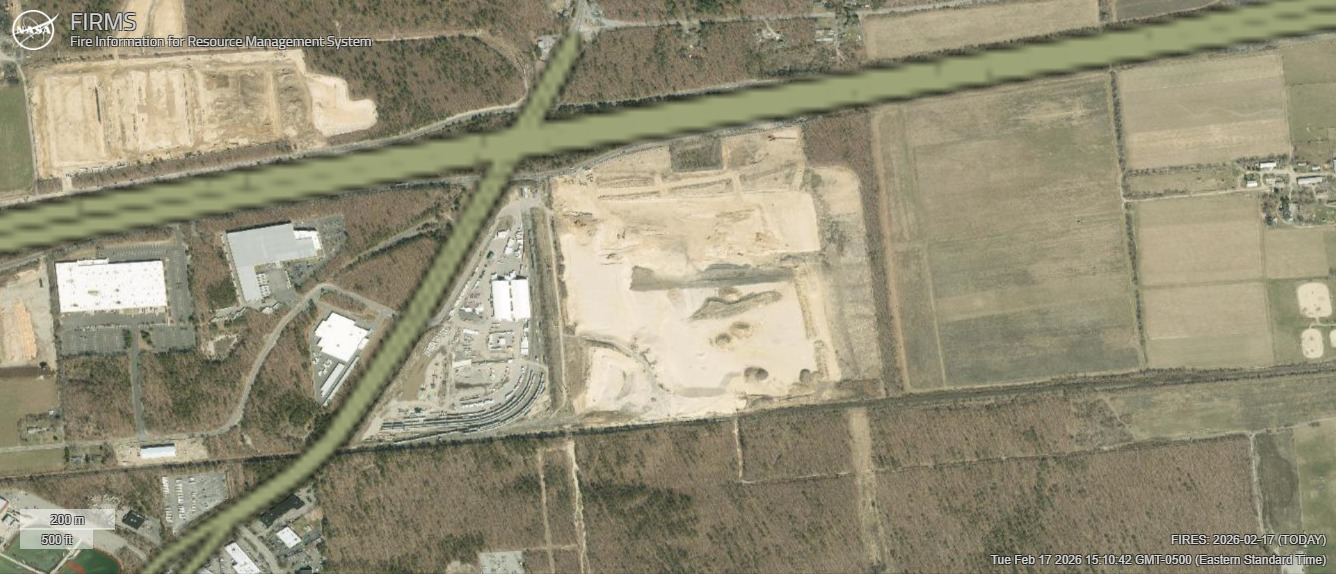
Satellite view of the Terminal, the triangular-shaped object in the center of the image.

Train operations on the site are handled by U.S. Rail of New York, LLC (reporting mark USNY), a Class III shortline railroad formed to operate the facility. Two EMD GP38 locomotives are used for on-site switching, while rail cars are delivered and picked up by the New York and Atlantic Railway which operates over the Long Island Rail Road Main Line. The site was chosen to minimize residential and traffic impacts: it is close to exit 66 on the Long Island Expressway and 1/4 mile (400 m) from the nearest home. (A proposal for a similar facility at the former Pilgrim State Hospital, 18 miles (29 km) to the west, was stymied by local opposition.) Adjacent tracts totaling an additional 93 acres (38 ha) are available for further expansion, including possible facilities for intermodal containers and refrigerated storage. The facility expected to handle over 10,000 railcars in its first full operating year.

The Town of Brookhaven originally tried to stop the project claiming in 2007 that BRT had not received proper approvals from the town nor environmental impact review. However, in 2010 the town settled with the developers after being advised that the federal Surface Transportation Board likely had jurisdiction over the project. The settlement included mitigation measures, such as dust controls, storm water retention, a visual landscape barrier, replanting 30% of the property, and $1 million in payments to the town. Under the agreement, the site is not to be used for loading or processing solid waste.

As of mid-2012, the facility is handling three commodities, construction aggregate, flour and biodiesel. The last is a result of a New York City Council requirement that heating oil sold in the city contain at least 2 percent biodiesel. In March 2013, BRT signed a 3-year agreement with Home Depot to accept rail shipments of lumber for Home Depot stores on Long Island. A warehouse and new siding will be built to handle the estimated 1820 rail-cars a year in additional traffic.

The terminal and its New York and Atlantic connection can accept railcar sizes up to Plate F loading gauge with a gross weight for four-axle cars up to 263,000 pounds (119,300 kg).

== Expansion ==
In late 2011, the company acquired two adjacent properties, increasing the site to 121 acres (49 ha), anticipating future traffic growth. BRT intends to build track on its additional property in the form of a stub-end loop, with trainload and terminal facilities along three sides of the loop. In March 2014, the Town of Brookhaven filed a lawsuit attempting to stop work on BRT's planned expansion. BRT, in response, asked the Surface Transportation Board for a declaratory order that the new rail track under construction is a spur track, and therefore is under the STB's exclusive jurisdiction and is not subject to licensing requirements or environmental review under the National Environmental Policy Act. According to BRT's filing, the facility has experienced strong traffic growth and its original 28-acre (11 ha) parcel is close to capacity, with all tracks in use.

In 2014, BRT averaged 130 rail cars per month and has 11 major customers. Commodities include lumber and building supplies for Home Depot and other companies, flour for several commercial bakeries, and biodiesel. Two tracks are used for arrival and departure trains, with a third "runner track" which allows the NY&A locomotives to return to the inbound end after delivering a train. Four 1100-foot (335 m) stub tracks and a track to the Home Depot facility are used for freight unloading. A short stub track that was originally intended for locomotive storage is also used to unload lumber. In 2017, BRT accepted 3,215 rail cars.

In June 2014, the town obtained a temporary restraining order barring "sand mining" operations on the site. The company says sand excavation is needed to lower the yard elevation below that of the LIRR main line for safety reasons. In November 2015, the town and the terminal reached a tentative agreement that would allow for the terminal's expansion. A final agreement was signed on March 16, 2016, that requires BRT to submit its expansion plans for town review under the New York State Environmental Quality Review Act (SEQRA), pay the town $500,000 and keep 62 acres (25 ha) of property as undeveloped green space. Previously, BRT had maintained federal railroad regulation preempted local review.

Winters Brothers affiliate Shamrock Rail acquired Brookhaven Rail LLC, the company responsible for rail operations at BRT, in 2020. The terminal itself remains a separate entity. Winters Brothers plans to build a waste-to-rail transfer facility on an adjacent property.

== See also ==
- Rail freight transportation in New York City and Long Island
