= Hauts-de-France =

Administrative region of France

Hauts-de-France Heuts-d'Franche (Picard) Upper France
- Region
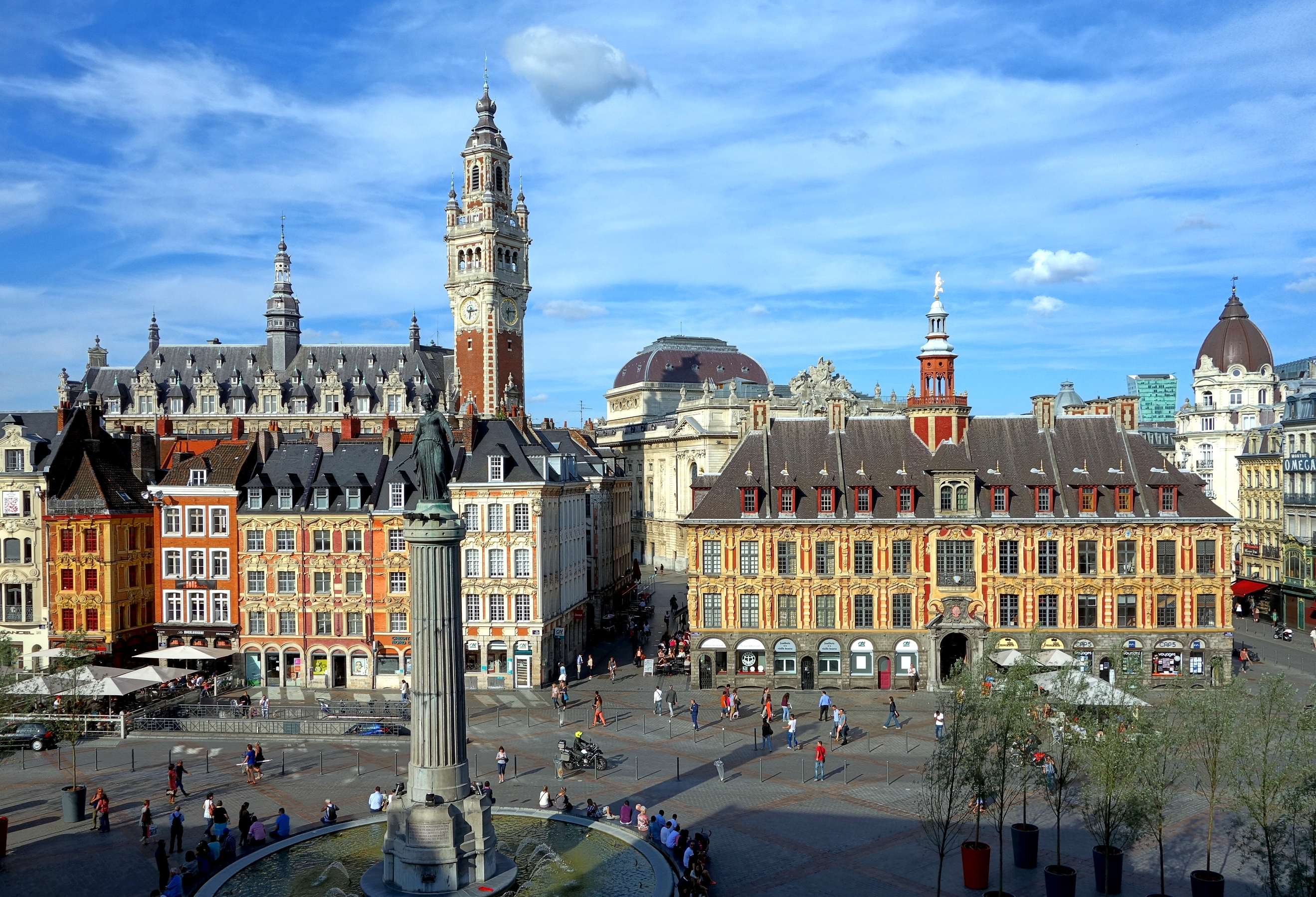
- Grand Place in Lille

- Brandmark

- Coordinates: 49.9206°N 2.7030°E
- Country: France
- Prefecture: Lille
- Departments: 5: Aisne (02); Nord (59); Oise (60); Pas-de-Calais (62); Somme (80)

Government
  - President of the Regional Council: Xavier Bertrand (LR)

Area
  - Total: 31,813 km^{2} (12,283 sq mi)
  - Rank: 9th
- Elevation: 295 m (968 ft)

Population (2023)
  - Total: 5,992,194
  - Rank: 3rd
  - Density: 188.36/km^{2} (487.84/sq mi)
- Demonym(s): Nordistes; Picards

GDP
  - Total: €185.472 billion (2022)
  - Per capita: €30,900 (2022)
- Time zone: UTC+01:00 (CET)
  - Summer (DST): UTC+02:00 (CEST)
- ISO 3166 code: FR-HDF
- NUTS Region: FRE
- Website: www.hautsdefrance.fr

Hauts-de-France (French: [o d(ə) fʁɑ̃s]; Picard: Heuts d'Franche; lit. 'Heights of France'), also referred to in English as Upper France, is the northernmost region of France, created by the territorial reform of French regions in 2014, from a merger of Nord-Pas-de-Calais and Picardy. Its prefecture is Lille. The new region came into existence on 1 January 2016, after regional elections in December 2015. The Conseil d'État approved Hauts-de-France as the name of the region on 28 September 2016, effective the following 30 September.

With 6,004,947 inhabitants as of 1 January 2022 and a population density of 189 inhabitants per km^{2}, it is the fourth most populous region in France and the second most densely populated in metropolitan France after its southern neighbour Île-de-France. It is bordered by Belgium to the north and by the United Kingdom to the northwest through the Channel Tunnel, a railway tunnel crossing the English Channel. The region is a blend mixture of French and (southern-) Dutch cultures.

== Toponymy ==
The region's interim name Nord-Pas-de-Calais-Picardie was a hyphenated placename, created by hyphenating the merged regions' names—Nord-Pas-de-Calais and Picardie—in alphabetical order.

On 14 March 2016, well ahead of the 1 July deadline, the regional council decided on Hauts-de-France as the region's permanent name. The provisional name of the region was retired on 30 September 2016, when the new name of the region, Hauts-de-France, took effect.

== Geography ==
The region covers an area of more than 31,813 km^{2} (12,283 sq mi). It borders Belgium (Flanders and Wallonia) to the northeast, the North Sea to the north, the English Channel to the west, as well as the French regions of Grand Est to the east-southeast, Île-de-France to the south, and Normandy to the west-southwest. It is connected to the United Kingdom (England) via the Channel Tunnel.

Map of the new region with its five départements, coloured according to the historical provinces as they existed until 1790. Picardy Île-de-France Artois French Flanders French Hainaut Cambrésis Champagne Normandy

=== Departments ===
Hauts-de-France comprises five departments: Aisne, Nord, Oise, Pas-de-Calais, and Somme.

=== Major communities ===
1. Lille (227,560; region prefecture; surrounding area is home to over 1.5 million inhabitants)
2. Amiens (133,448)
3. Roubaix (94,713)
4. Tourcoing (91,923)
5. Dunkirk (90,995)
6. Calais (72,589)
7. Villeneuve-d'Ascq (62,308)
8. Saint-Quentin (55,978)
9. Beauvais (54,289)
10. Valenciennes (42,691)

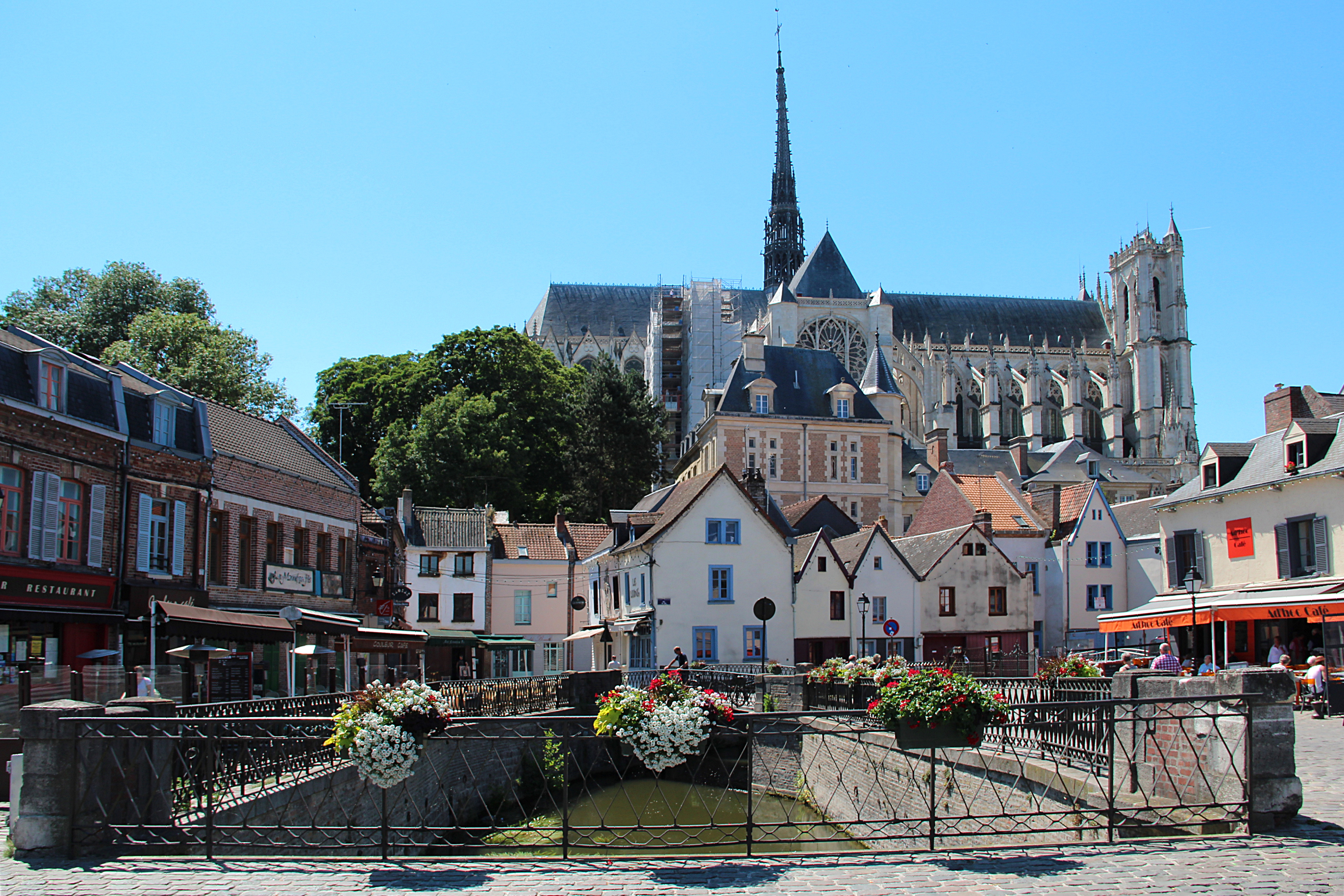
Amiens

View of the White Cliffs of Dover, England, from Wissant, France

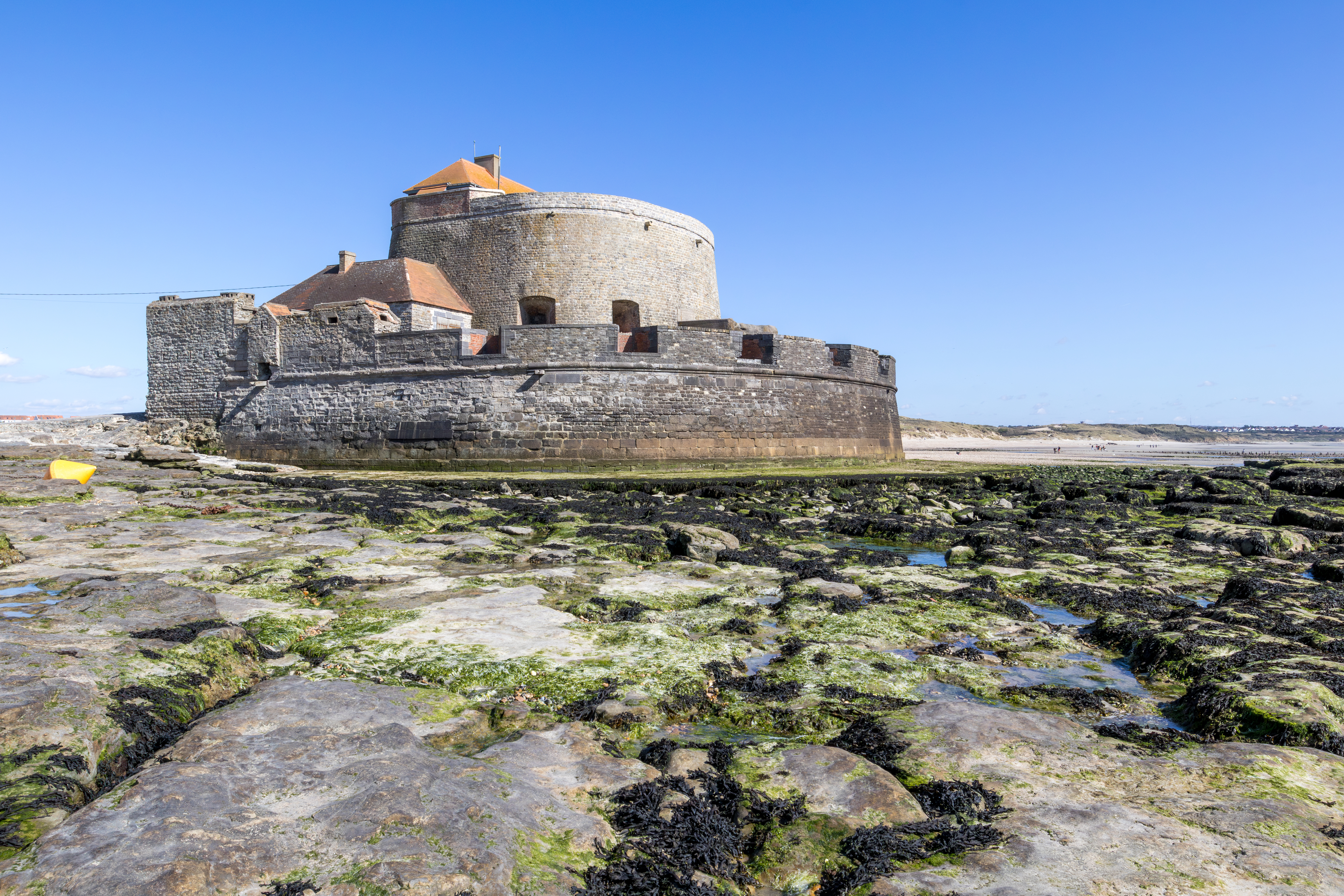
Fort Mahon, or Fort Vauban, in Ambleteuse

Château d'Hardelot seen from the gardens

Notre-Dame-de-Lorette National Cemetery

The Louvre-Lens

The Belfry of Béthune

Saint-Valery-sur-Somme

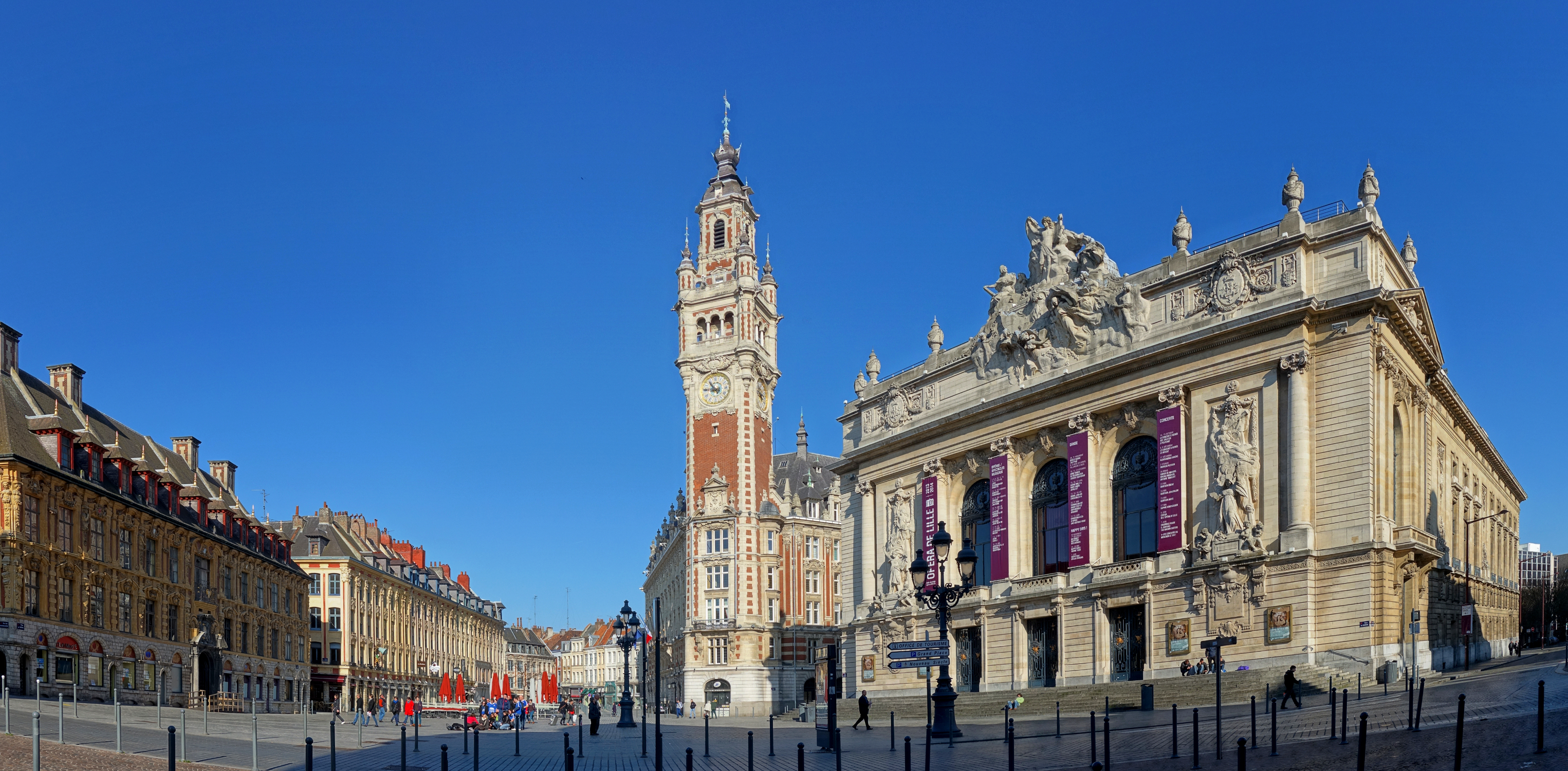
Lille

== Economy ==
The gross domestic product (GDP) of the region was 161.7 billion euros in 2018, accounting for 6.9% of French economic output. GDP per capita adjusted for purchasing power was 24,200 euros or 80% of the EU27 average in the same year. The GDP per employee was 101% of the EU average.

== Transport ==
=== Air ===
There are only 2 operating airports in the region which are Lille Airport and Paris–Beauvais Airport. Residents in the region normally use other major airports such as Brussels Airport and Paris's Charles de Gaulle Airport which both can easily be reached by train and car.

=== Rail ===
The region is an important transport corridor between France, Belgium and the United Kingdom. Lille-Europe station is served by TGV and continental Eurostar high-speed rail services linking the region with Paris, Brussels and Amsterdam. There are further connections to London via the Channel Tunnel.

=== Sea ===
The ports of Calais and Dunkirk provide passenger and freight ferry services across the English Channel, while LeShuttle provides a car-train service between Coquelles and Folkestone through the Channel Tunnel.

== See also ==
- Battle of Vimy Ridge
- Canadian National Vimy Memorial
- Regional Council of the Hauts-de-France
- Achicourt station
