= New York and Atlantic Railway =

Short line railroad in New York, US

- Map of NY&A System

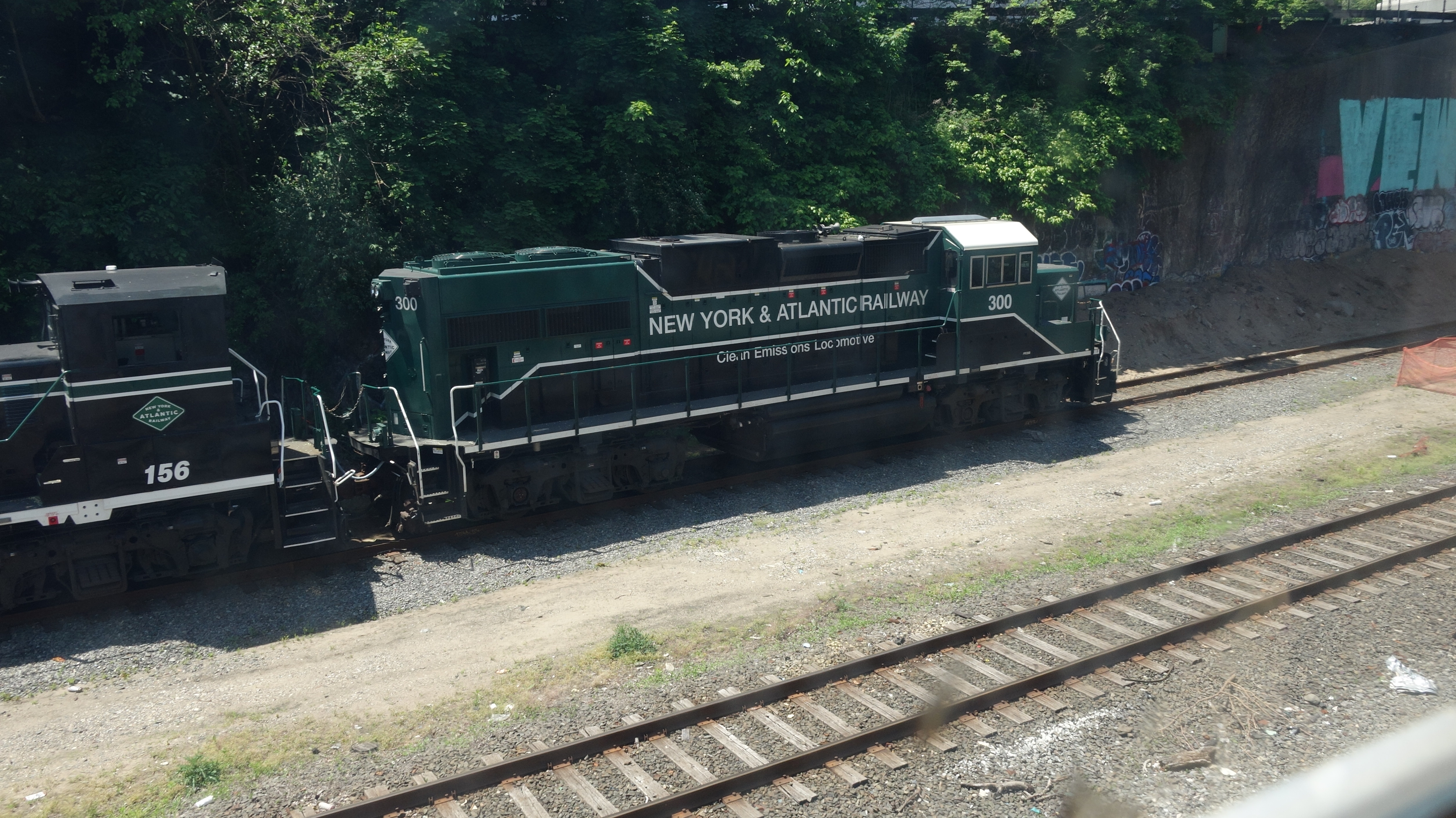
- New York and Atlantic Railroad #300 at 7th Avenue in Brooklyn

Overview
- Headquarters: Glendale, Queens
- Reporting mark: NYA
- Locale: Long Island, New York
- Dates of operation: 1997–present

Technical
- Track gauge: 4 ft 8 1/2 in (1,435 mm)

Other
- Website: www.anacostia.com/railroads/nya

The New York and Atlantic Railway (NY&A) (reporting mark NYA) is a short line railroad on Long Island, within the southeastern portion of the U.S. state of New York. It was formed in 1997 to provide freight service over the tracks of the Long Island Rail Road, a public commuter rail agency which had decided to privatize its freight operations. A subsidiary of the Anacostia Rail Holdings Company, NY&A operates exclusively on Long Island and is connected to the U.S. mainland via CSX's Fremont Secondary over the Hell Gate Bridge. It also interchanges with New York New Jersey Rail's car float at the 65th Street Yard and US Rail of New York in Yaphank, New York. Its primary freight yard is Fresh Pond Junction in Queens. It has another yard, Pine Aire Yard, in northern Bay Shore, New York. The NY&A officially took over Long Island Rail Road's freight operations on May 11, 1997, with an initial franchise for 20 years.

== Operations ==
The New York & Atlantic serves about 80 customers. Lumber, building products, scrap metal, construction & demolition debris, bio-diesel fuel, food, beer, gravel, propane, chemicals, structural steel, plastics and recyclable cardboard/paper are the NYA's main traffic. Occasionally, NYA will transport utility poles and electrical transformers to the Long Island Power Authority facility in Hicksville, which has its own spurs. NYA also moves municipal solid waste in sealed containers on container trains. NYA serves Belmont Park, delivering boxcars, usually from BNSF, full of feed for the race track's horses. For occasions such as the Super Bowl or St. Patrick's Day, the NYA transports 30 rail cars of beer per week, with each car holding 3,500 cases.

Some NYA customers are located off-line, and will make use of NYA's team tracks to receive or ship products. Team tracks are located in Bay Ridge, Hicksville, Huntington, Greenlawn, St. James, Islip, Richmond Hill, Maspeth, Speonk, Medford, Southold, and elsewhere on the Long Island Rail Road (LIRR) lines that NYA serves. Most of NYA's customers have their own spurs, making the use of team tracks unnecessary. A new 28-acre, privately funded transload facility in Yaphank, Brookhaven Rail Terminal, opened in 2011.

In 2014, work was underway to build a transload facility for vegetable oil, food products and construction material at NYA's Wheel Spur Yard along Newtown Creek near Long Island City. NYA expects the facility to support construction of the replacement Kosciuszko Bridge. The yard reopened in 2015.

Other products shipped to Long Island via the NYA include bentonite and rock salt. NYA carries nearly 1 million tons of gravel a year from Connecticut quarries, delivered to the NYA by the Providence and Worcester Railroad. The Long Island Rail Road and the New York City Transit Authority occasionally receive new rail cars, and ship out old, retired equipment for scrapping by way of the Bay Ridge Branch.

=== Traffic ===
New York & Atlantic moved 30,000 carloads in 2018, up from approximately 9,200 when it began operating in May 1997. The majority of its deliveries take place during the night, when fewer commuter trains are running.

About 15 percent of freight cars transported by the NYA are floated across New York Harbor from Jersey City to NYNJ Rails's railyard in Bay Ridge on the Brooklyn waterfront. The daily barge operation is managed by the Port Authority of New York and New Jersey, but the number of cars transferred to NYA by that method had been restricted by the use of only one aging barge that has a 14-car capacity. In 2017 and 2018, the Port Authority added two new barges, each with a capacity of 18 cars. The proposed Cross-Harbor Rail Tunnel, if built, is projected to transport 25,000 cars annually, up from 5,000 per year circa 2018.

== Crewing ==
As of 2019, NYA has about 60 employees, including eight train crews. The railroad has substantially different crewing agreements than the Long Island Rail Road, allowing it more flexibility to match the needs of freight customers. NYA has two crewbases, one in Glendale, Queens and another near the former LIRR station Pine Aire on the main line, between Deer Park and Brentwood. On a typical weekday, NYA operates six crews.

== Incidents ==
July 8, 2015 – An NYA freight train smashed into a tractor trailer after the crossing gates went down slowly in Maspeth, Queens; the truck driver escaped with minor injuries.

June 17, 2021 – NYA Train RS41, consisting of Locomotives 300 and 271, was rear ended by Long Island Rail Road Inspection Car TC82 east of the Cold Spring Harbor station. Minor injuries were reported by crew members of both trains.

== Gallery ==
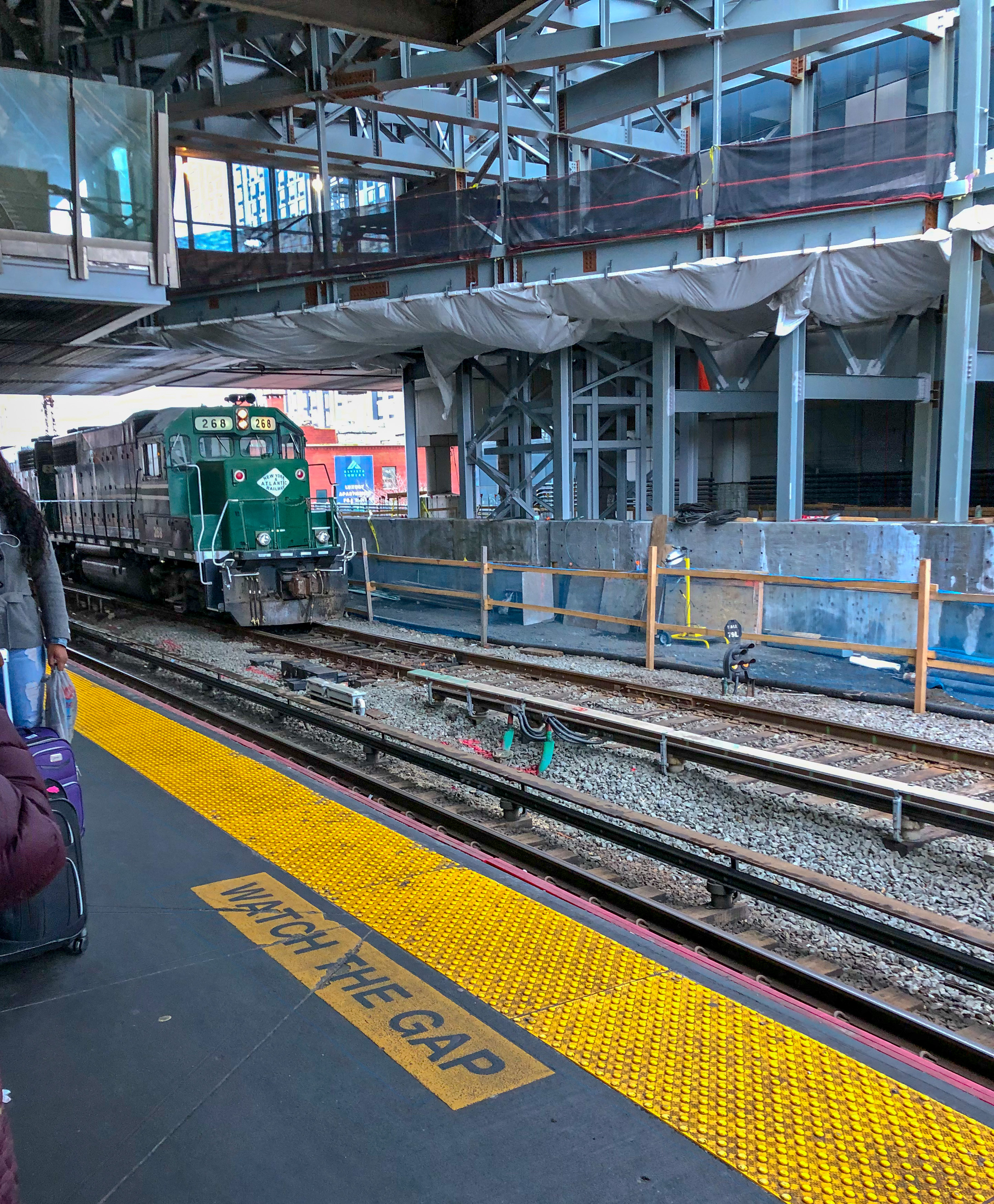
268 passing through Jamaica Station in 2019

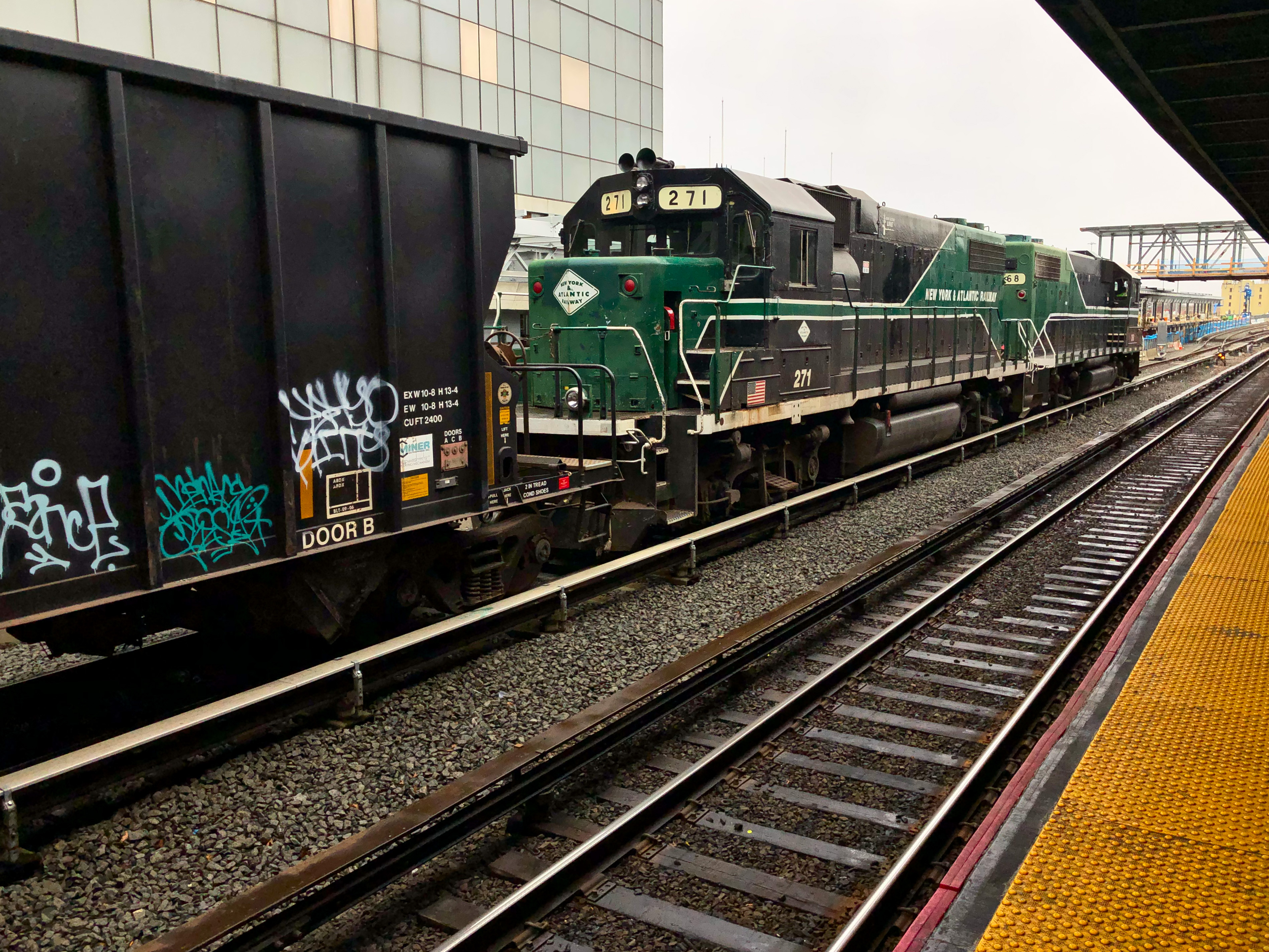
271 at Jamaica Station in 2019

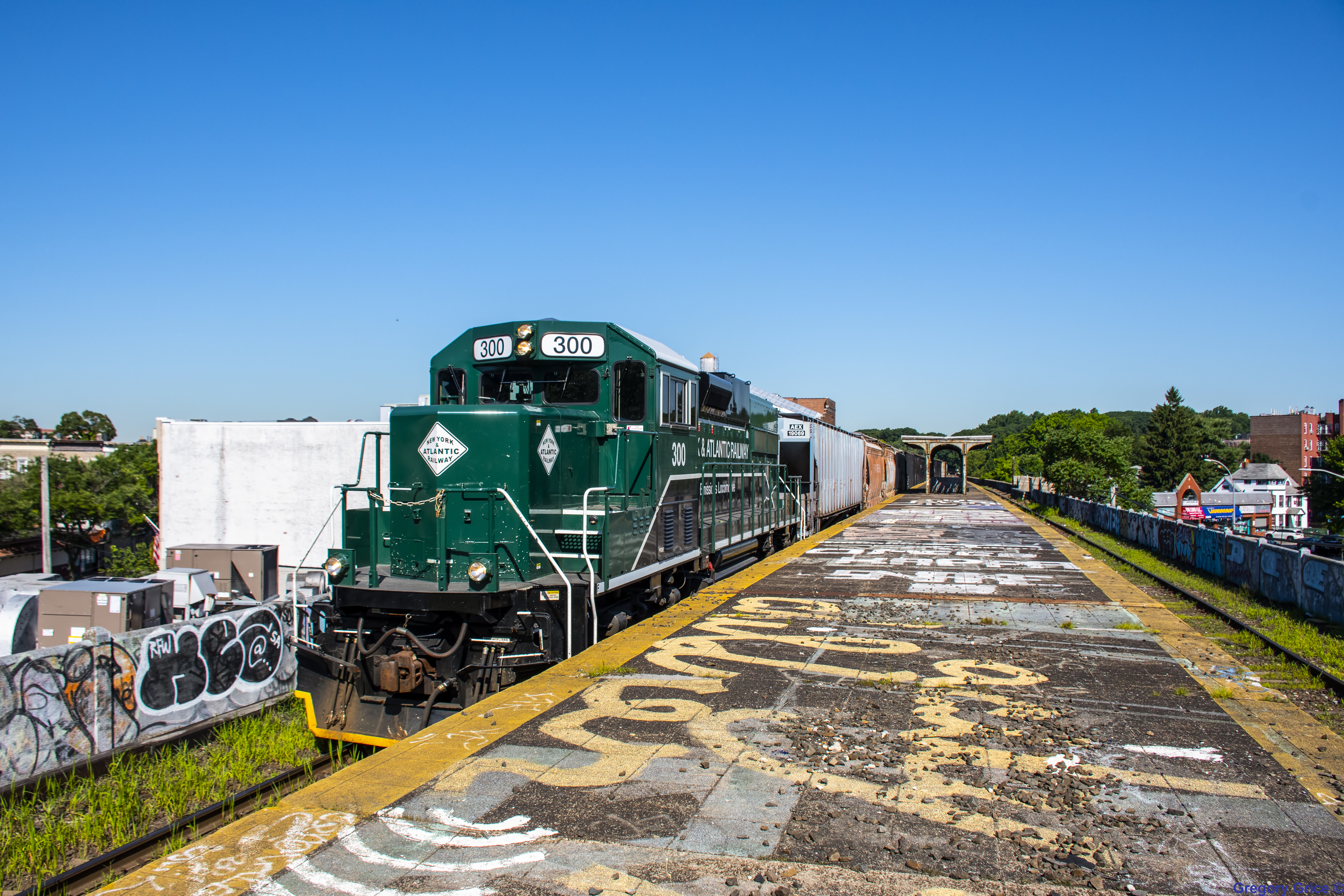
Newly built 300 at former Richmond Hill Station in 2018

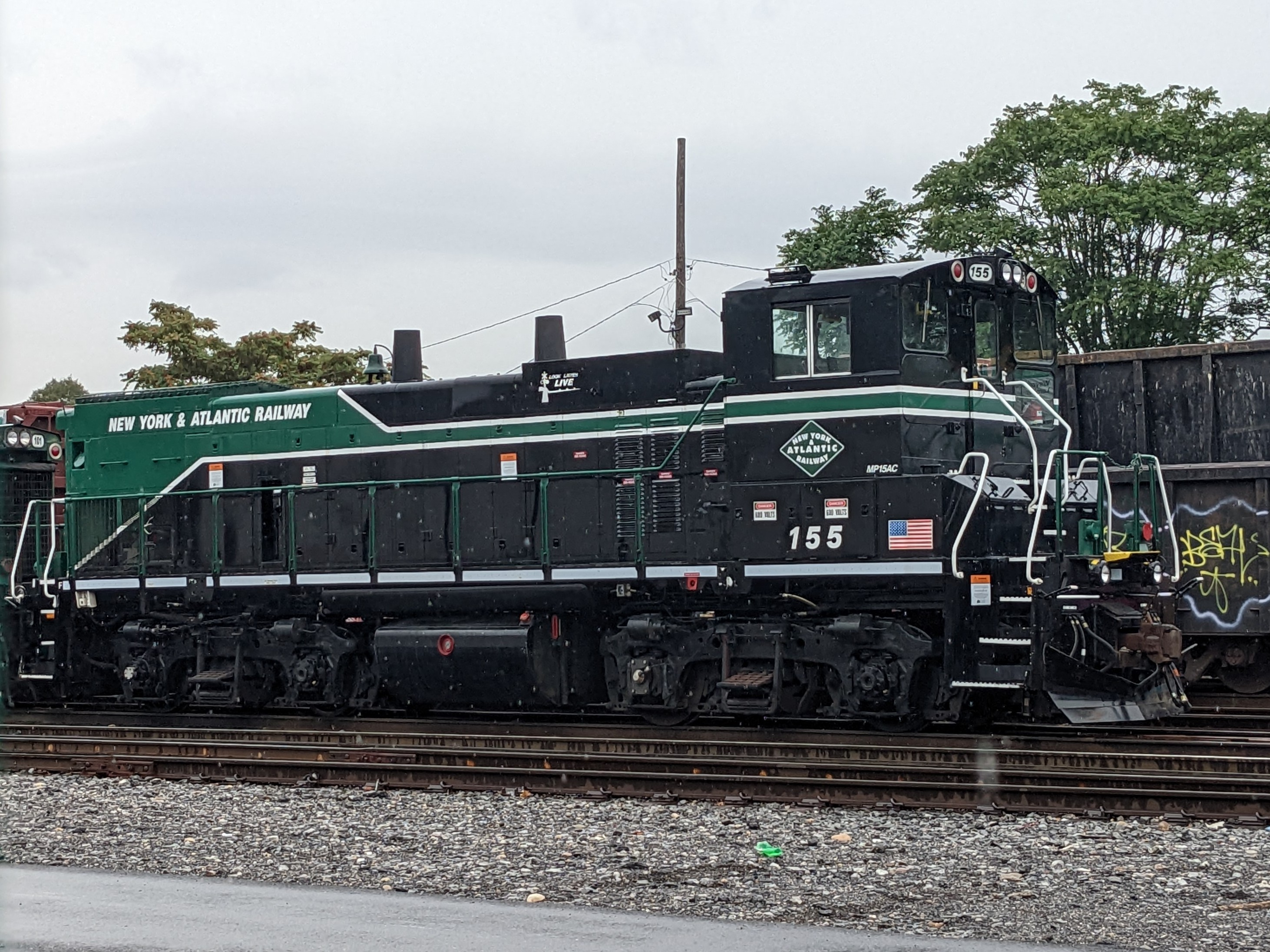
New York and Atlantic Railroad #155 at Fresh Pond Yard

== See also ==
- Rail freight transportation in New York City and Long Island
