= NSI-63 =

Relay-based railway interlocking system used in Norway

NSI-63 is a railway signaling system used for interlocking on the Norwegian railway network. It is based on relays and was developed by Norsk Signal Industri for the Norwegian State Railways (NSB) during the early 1960s. The systems are installed at railway stations and passing loops and consist of single relays built form drawings. The system is simple, robust and economical for smaller stations on single-track railways. The system makes use of track circuits for train detection.

== History ==
NSB-63 was based on NSB-EB, the very first automatic interlocking system used in Norway. NSB-63 is the most common system used in Norway, with about 220 installed interlockings belonging to the Norwegian National Rail Administration. This is more than the combined number of other interlocking systems. About 140 of the systems were installed during the 1960s, with about 80 installed during the 1970s. NSB later developed a series of modified versions of NSI-63, which were installed up until the 1990s. The first development was NSI-63/PLS, which used programmable logic controllers (PLC) instead of telephone relays. Other variations include NSB-78 and NSB-84, which have about 25 and 10 installed units, respectively.

The most extensive redevelopment of NSI-63 is NSB-87. It was developed to be installed on the Røros Line, including all stations between Hamar and Røros, and selected stations on the Nordland Line. It was designed to only work at the simplest stations, and lacks some of the more advanced features in NSI-63. NSB-87 was developed by SattControl, now part of ABB Group, who made the computer and communication systems, based on PLC. The National Rail Administration made the relay circuits and the software. The design of NSB-87 included a simplification of the NSI-63 design, in particular to reduce costs.

During the 1990s, NSB and its successor the Norwegian National Rail Administration chose to install Siemens ESTW on the Gardermoen Line, and Adtranz-developed NSB-GS at Oslo Central Station. Following the Åsta accident, the Accident Investigation Board Norway criticized the National Rail Administration for having installed NSB-87, a system that by the time it was installed, was out of date, a mixed relay and PLC technology in an inappropriate way.

From the mid-2000s, Norway has been required to implement European Rail Traffic Management System (ERTMS) on all new lines. The first part of this, GSM-R, was finished installed on the whole railway network from 2 January 2007. The estimated lifetime of NSI-63-based systems are 40 to 50 years. The National Rail Administration has started a plan to replace the existing interlocking systems with an ERTMS-compatible system. In 2008, the Merkur system designed by ABB was not permitted used by the Norwegian Railway Inspectorate, and the National Rail Administration has chosen to instead adopt a strategy to retain the use of NSI-63 on all new railway projects until the introduction of ERTMS Level 2. As of 2010, the administration's plan is to build the Eastern Østfold Line with ERTMS by 2014, and from 2015 convert the remaining parts of the network. The administration has estimated the cost to rebuild the signaling throughout the network to between 15 and 20 billion Norwegian krone. The Swedish Transport Administration plans to build ERTMS on two of the lines that connect to Norway, the Värmland Line and the Norway/Vänern Line, by 2020.
