= Norwegian County Road 300 =

Road in Vestfold county, Norway

County Road 300

Route information
- Length: 7.0 km (4.3 mi)

Major junctions
- West end: E18 at Aulerød
- East end: Kilen

Location
- Country: Norway
- Counties: Vestfold
- Major cities: Tønsberg

Highway system
- Roads in Norway; National Roads; County Roads

County Road 300 (Norwegian: Fylkesvei 300) or Ringveg nord (English: Ring Road North) is a bypass road running along the north side of the town of Tønsberg in Tønsberg Municipality in Vestfold county, Norway. The road is 7.0 kilometers (4.3 mi) long and it connects the eastern part of Tønsberg, via the Frodeåsen Tunnel, to the European route E18 highway in the village of Sem. The road opened on 13 March 2008.

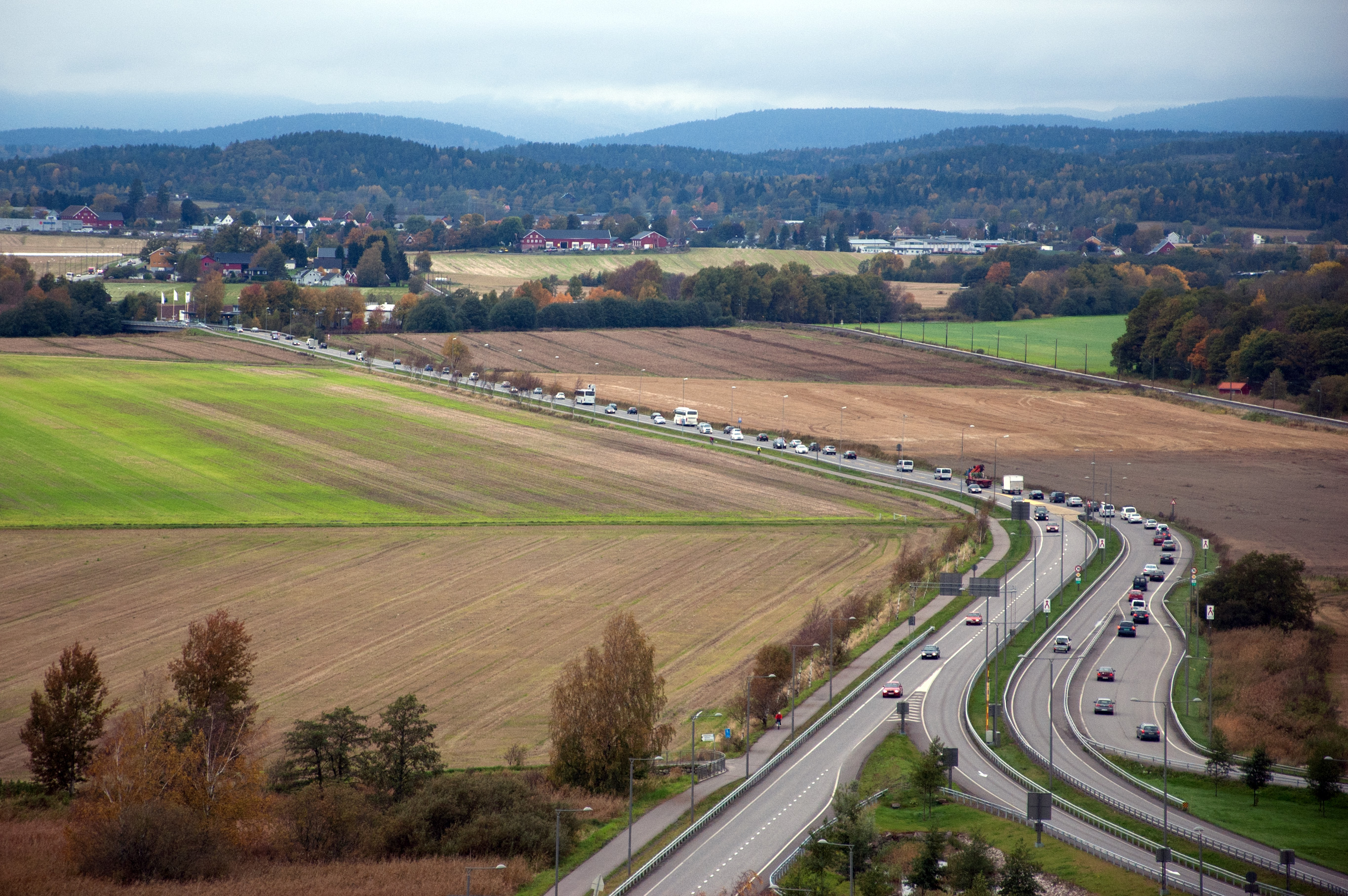
The road at Semslinna
