= Borre =

Borre may refer to:

== Places ==
=== France ===
- Borre, Nord, a commune of the Nord département in northern France

=== Denmark ===
- Borre, Denmark, a village on the island of Møn
- Borre Fen, a bog in Himmerland, a peninsula in northeastern Jutland
- A placename "borrenakken" in Vaalse county, on the northern part of the island of Falster, south of Zealand

=== Norway ===
- Borre, Norway, a village in Horten Municipality in Vestfold county
  - Borre National Park, a national part in Vestfold county
  - Borre mound cemetery, an ancient cemetery in Horten Municipality in Vestfold county
  - Borre Church, a church in Horten Municipality in Vestfold county
  - Borre Golfbane, a golf course in Horten Municipality in Vestfold county
  - Borre IF, multi-sports club in Horten Municipality in Vestfold county
- Borre Municipality, a former municipality (1838-1988) in Vestfold county
- Borre Municipality, the old name (from 1988 until 2002) for Horten Municipality in Vestfold county

== People ==
- Anthony Vanden Borre (born 1987), a Belgian footballer
- Martin Borre (born 1979), a Danish footballer
- Peter Borre (1716–1789), a Danish merchant
- Anne-Sophie Vanden Borre (born 2001), a Belgian field hockey player
- Matthias Vanden Borre (born 1984), a Belgian lawyer and politician
- Stephanie Vanden Borre (born 1997), a Belgian field hockey player

== Other uses ==
- Borre style, a Scandinavian art style named after a boat grave in Borre in Vestfold county, Norway

== See also ==
- Rafael Santos Borré
- Børre
