= Borre Municipality =

Former municipality in Norway

Borre Municipality Borre kommune
- Former municipality
- Borre herred (historic name)
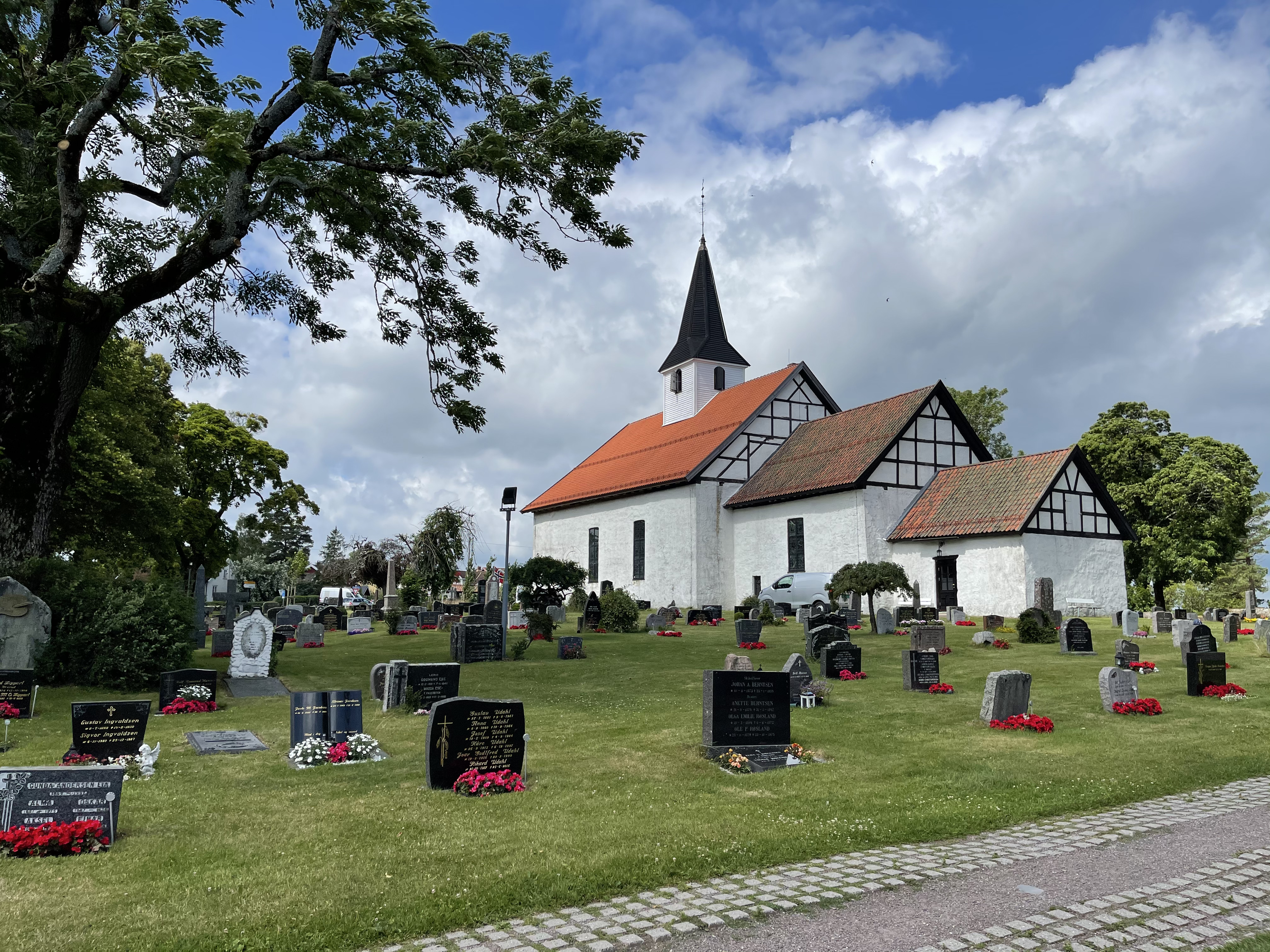
- View of the local Borre Church

- Vestfold within Norway

- Borre within Vestfold
- Coordinates: 59°22′55″N 10°27′23″E
- Country: Norway
- County: Vestfold
- District: Jarlsberg
- Established: 1 Jan 1838
  - Created as: Formannskapsdistrikt
- Disestablished: 1 Jan 1988
  - Succeeded by: Borre Municipality
- Administrative centre: Borre

Government
  - Mayor (1980–1987): Reidar Hanssen Sande (H)

Area (upon dissolution)
  - Total: 61.6 km^{2} (23.8 sq mi)
  - Rank: #422 in Norway
- Highest elevation (Kjærranåsen): 157.54 m (516.9 ft)

Population (1987)
  - Total: 9,098
  - Rank: #109 in Norway
  - Density: 147.7/km^{2} (383/sq mi)
  - Change (10 years): ▲ +8.2%
- Demonym: Borresokning

Official language
  - Norwegian form: Bokmål
- Time zone: UTC+01:00 (CET)
  - Summer (DST): UTC+02:00 (CEST)
- ISO 3166 code: NO-0717

Borre (Norwegian pronunciation: [¹bɔrːə]; locally [¹bɔra]) is a former municipality in Vestfold county, Norway. The 61.6-square-kilometre (23.8 sq mi) municipality existed from 1838 until its dissolution in 1988. The area is now part of Horten Municipality in the traditional district of Jarlsberg. The administrative centre was the village of Borre. Other larger settlements in the municipality included the town of Åsgårdstrand (from 1965-1988) and the villages of Skoppum and Nykirke. The main churches in Borre were Borre Church and Nykirke Church. The historic Borre mound cemetery was located in the municipality.

Prior to its dissolution in 1988, the 61.6-square-kilometre (23.8 sq mi) municipality was the 422nd largest by area out of the 454 municipalities in Norway. Borre Municipality was the 109th most populous municipality in Norway with a population of about 9,098. The municipality's population density was 147.7 inhabitants per square kilometre (383/sq mi) and its population had increased by 8.2% over the previous 10-year period.

== General information ==
=== Administrative history ===
The formannskapsdistrikt law of 1837 created a system of local government in Norway by establishing each town (ladested or kjøpstad) and each Church of Norway prestegjeld as a civil municipality. On 1 January 1838, Borre prestegjeld was established as Borre Municipality.

On 1 January 1858, the small coastal port village of Horten (population: 4,636) was separated from Borre Municipality when it was designated as a ladested, making it a separate urban municipality. This left Borre Municipality with 2,954 residents. On 1 August 1921, an area of Borre Municipality (population: 287) was transferred into the neighboring Horten Municipality. On 1 July 1951, another area of Borre Municipality (population: 308) was transferred into Horten Municipality.

During the 1960s, there were many municipal mergers across Norway due to the work of the Schei Committee. On 1 January 1965, Borre Municipality was enlarged when the following areas were merged:

- all of Borre Municipality (population: 6,037)
- all of Åsgårdstrand Municipality (population: 488)
- the Stang area from Sem Municipality (population: 126)

On 1 January 1986, the eastern Skavli area of Borre Municipality (population: 22) was transferred into Horten Municipality. On 1 January 1988, Borre Municipality (population: 9,098) was dissolved and merged with Horten Municipality (population: 12,994) to form a new, larger Borre Municipality (the name of this new municipality was later changed to Horten Municipality).

=== Name ===
The municipality is named after the old Borre prestegjeld. The prestegjeld was named after the old Borre farm (Old Norse: Borró) since the first Borre Church was built there. The name has an uncertain meaning. The first element may derives from borð which means "side" or "edge" or from the word borg which means "castle" or "fortified place". The last element may come from ró which means "rest" or rá which means "corner".

=== Churches ===
The Church of Norway had three parishes (sokn) within Borre Municipality. At the time of the municipal dissolution, it was part of the Borre prestegjeld and the Nord-Jarlsberg prosti (deanery) in the Diocese of Tunsberg.

Churches in Borre Municipality
Parish (sokn)	Church name	Location of the church	Year built
Borre	Borre Church	Borre	c. 1100
Nykirke	Nykirke Church	Nykirke	c. 1100
Åsgårdstrand	Åsgårdstrand Church	Åsgårdstrand	1969

== Geography ==
The highest point in the municipality was the 157.54-metre (516.9 ft) tall mountain Kjærranåsen in the western part of the municipalityi. Sande Municipality was located to the north (across the Ytre Oslofjord), Horten Municipality was located to the northeast, Moss Municipality and Rygge Municipality (both in Østfold county) were located to the east (across the Ytre Oslofjord, Sem Municipality was located to the south, and Våle Municipality was located to the west.

== Government ==
While it existed, Borre Municipality was responsible for primary education (through 10th grade), outpatient health services, senior citizen services, welfare and other social services, zoning, economic development, and municipal roads and utilities. The municipality was governed by a municipal council of directly elected representatives. The mayor was indirectly elected by a vote of the municipal council. The municipality was under the jurisdiction of the Horten District Court and the Agder Court of Appeal.

=== Municipal council ===
The municipal council (Kommunestyre) of Borre Municipality was made up of 35 representatives that were elected to four-year terms. The tables below show the historical composition of the council by political party.

Borre kommunestyre 1983–1987
Party name (in Norwegian)	Number of representatives
Labour Party (Arbeiderpartiet)	14
Conservative Party (Høyre)	15
Christian Democratic Party (Kristelig Folkeparti)	2
Centre Party (Senterpartiet)	2
Total number of members:	35
Note: On 1 January 1988, Borre Municipality became part of Horten Municipality.

Borre kommunestyre 1979–1983
Party name (in Norwegian)	Number of representatives
Labour Party (Arbeiderpartiet)	14
Conservative Party (Høyre)	16
Christian Democratic Party (Kristelig Folkeparti)	2
Centre Party (Senterpartiet)	2
Socialist Left Party (Sosialistisk Venstreparti)	1
Total number of members:	35

Borre kommunestyre 1975–1979
Party name (in Norwegian)	Number of representatives
Labour Party (Arbeiderpartiet)	11
Conservative Party (Høyre)	12
Christian Democratic Party (Kristelig Folkeparti)	2
Centre Party (Senterpartiet)	3
Socialist Left Party (Sosialistisk Venstreparti)	1
Total number of members:	29

Borre kommunestyre 1971–1975
Party name (in Norwegian)	Number of representatives
Labour Party (Arbeiderpartiet)	12
Conservative Party (Høyre)	9
Christian Democratic Party (Kristelig Folkeparti)	1
Centre Party (Senterpartiet)	3
Socialist People's Party (Sosialistisk Folkeparti)	1
Liberal Party (Venstre)	1
Total number of members:	27

Borre kommunestyre 1967–1971
Party name (in Norwegian)	Number of representatives
Labour Party (Arbeiderpartiet)	13
Conservative Party (Høyre)	10
Centre Party (Senterpartiet)	2
Socialist People's Party (Sosialistisk Folkeparti)	1
Liberal Party (Venstre)	1
Total number of members:	27

Borre kommunestyre 1963–1967
Party name (in Norwegian)	Number of representatives
Labour Party (Arbeiderpartiet)	12
Conservative Party (Høyre)	8
Centre Party (Senterpartiet)	2
Liberal Party (Venstre)	1
Total number of members:	23

Borre herredsstyre 1959–1963
Party name (in Norwegian)	Number of representatives
Labour Party (Arbeiderpartiet)	12
Conservative Party (Høyre)	8
Centre Party (Senterpartiet)	2
Liberal Party (Venstre)	1
Total number of members:	23

Borre herredsstyre 1955–1959
Party name (in Norwegian)	Number of representatives
Labour Party (Arbeiderpartiet)	11
Conservative Party (Høyre)	8
Farmers' Party (Bondepartiet)	3
Liberal Party (Venstre)	1
Total number of members:	23

Borre herredsstyre 1951–1955
Party name (in Norwegian)	Number of representatives
Labour Party (Arbeiderpartiet)	10
Liberal Party (Venstre)	1
Joint List(s) of Non-Socialist Parties (Borgerlige Felleslister)	9
Total number of members:	20

Borre herredsstyre 1947–1951
Party name (in Norwegian)	Number of representatives
Labour Party (Arbeiderpartiet)	9
Joint List(s) of Non-Socialist Parties (Borgerlige Felleslister)	11
Total number of members:	20

Borre herredsstyre 1945–1947
Party name (in Norwegian)	Number of representatives
Labour Party (Arbeiderpartiet)	10
Conservative Party (Høyre)	6
Farmers' Party (Bondepartiet)	4
Total number of members:	20

Borre herredsstyre 1937–1941*
Party name (in Norwegian)	Number of representatives
Labour Party (Arbeiderpartiet)	7
Farmers' Party (Bondepartiet)	4
Liberal Party (Venstre)	1
Joint List(s) of Non-Socialist Parties (Borgerlige Felleslister)	8
Total number of members:	20
Note: Due to the German occupation of Norway during World War II, no elections were held for new municipal councils until after the war ended in 1945.

=== Mayors ===
The mayor (Norwegian: ordfører) of Borre Municipality was the political leader of the municipality and the chairperson of the municipal council. The following people have held this position:

- 1838–1845: Paul Gerhard Bergh
- 1846–1847: Søren Nilsen
- 1847–1851: Hans Emahus Tønder Sandborg
- 1852–1859: Frederik Honoratus Bonnevie
- 1859–1863: Søren Nilsen
- 1863–1867: Paul Lorch
- 1868–1869: Søren Nilsen
- 1870–1871: Paul Lorch
- 1872–1875: Søren Nilsen
- 1876–1883: Lars Hansen Vik (H)
- 1884–1884: Nils Andersen
- 1885–1885: Carl August Henrichsen
- 1886–1889: Anders Mathiassen Wold (H)
- 1890–1895: Einar Konow (V)
- 1896–1905: Anders Mathiassen Wold (H)
- 1905–1907: Hans Larsen Dahl
- 1908–1910: Christoffer Hannevig, Sr. (H)
- 1910–1910: Bernhart Haugestad (H)
- 1911–1919: Nils Hansen Sande (H)
- 1920–1922: Bernhart Haugestad (H)
- 1923–1928: Nils Hansen Sande (H)
- 1929–1945: Vagn Knudsen (H/NS)
- 1945–1945: Anker Knutsen (Ap)
- 1945–1945: Karl Jacobsen Bergan (H)
- 1946–1947: Anker Knutsen (Ap)
- 1948–1951: Ulf Smith Andersen (H)
- 1952–1955: Erling Lensberg (Ap)
- 1956–1959: Nordahl Raaen (H)
- 1959–1965: Arnfred Grostøl (Ap)
- 1967–1968: Rolf Helland (H)
- 1968–1972: Arnfred Grostøl (Ap)
- 1972–1980: Bjarne Lilaas (H)
- 1980–1987: Reidar Hanssen Sande (H)

== See also ==
- List of former municipalities of Norway
