= Åsgårdstrand =

Town in Vestfold county, Norway

- Town/City
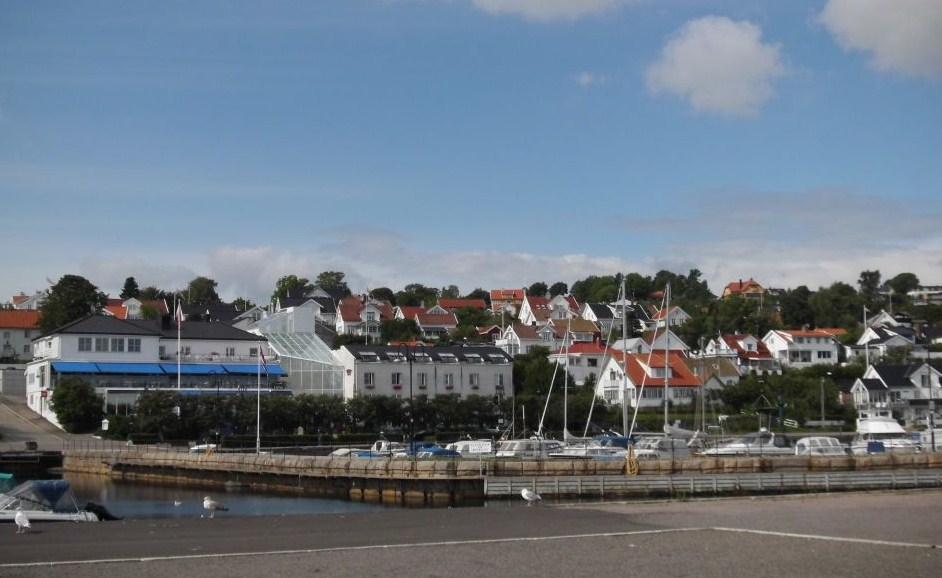
- View of the town in 2012
- Interactive map of Åsgårdstrand
- Coordinates: 59.34938°N 10.46948°E
- Country: Norway
- Region: Eastern Norway
- County: Vestfold
- District: Jarlsberg
- Municipality: Horten Municipality; Tønsberg Municipality
- Established as
- Ladested: 1650–1965
- Town (By): 1 Jan 2010

Area
  - Total: 1.56 km^{2} (0.60 sq mi)
- Elevation: 12 m (39 ft)

Population (2026)
  - Total: 3,090
  - Density: 1,981/km^{2} (5,130/sq mi)
- Demonym: Åsgårdstranding
- Time zone: UTC+01:00 (CET)
  - Summer (DST): UTC+02:00 (CEST)
- Post Code: 3179 Åsgårdstrand
- Former municipality
- Åsgårdstrand ladested Aasgaardstrand ladested (historic name)
- Coat of arms

- Vestfold within Norway

- Åsgårdstrand within Vestfold
- Country: Norway
- County: Vestfold
- District: Jarlsberg
- Established: 1 Jan 1838
  - Created as: Formannskapsdistrikt
- Disestablished: 1 Jan 1965
  - Succeeded by: Borre Municipality
- Administrative centre: Åsgårdstrand

Government
  - Mayor (1963–1964): Rolf Helland Larsen (H)

Area (upon dissolution)
  - Total: 0.18 km^{2} (0.069 sq mi)
  - Rank: #525 in Norway

Population (1964)
  - Total: 473
  - Rank: #519 in Norway
  - Density: 2,627.8/km^{2} (6,806/sq mi)
  - Change (10 years): ▼ −11.3%

Official language
  - Norwegian form: Bokmål
- Time zone: UTC+01:00 (CET)
  - Summer (DST): UTC+02:00 (CEST)
- ISO 3166 code: NO-0704

Åsgårdstrand (Norwegian pronunciation: [²ɔːsɡoːɖstrɑn]; locally [²ɔːsɡoːrstræn]; historically spelled Aasgaardstrand) is a small port town in both Horten Municipality and Tønsberg Municipality in Vestfold county, Norway. The town is located along the shore of the Ytre Oslofjord, about 8 kilometres (5.0 mi) south of the town of Horten, about 10 kilometres (6.2 mi) to the north of the town of Tønsberg, and about 100 kilometres (62 mi) south of the capital city of Oslo. The villages of Borre and Skoppum both lie a short distance northwest of Åsgårdstrand.

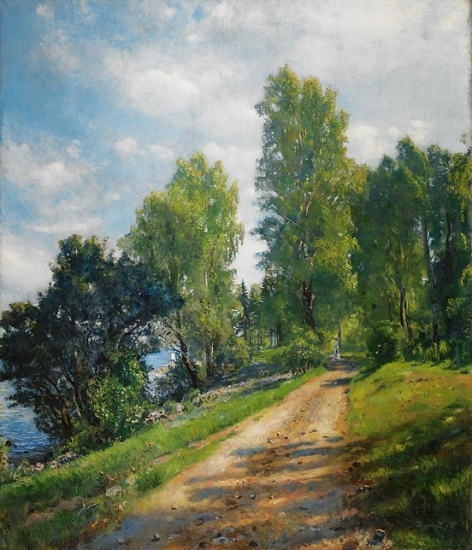
Landeveien, Åsgårdstrand Credit: Hans Heyerdahl (1890)

The 1.47-square-kilometre (360-acre) town has a population (2023) of 2959 and a population density of 2,014 inhabitants per square kilometre (5,220/sq mi). Most of the town lies within Horten Municipality, but a 0.05-square-kilometre (12-acre) area of the town with 56 residents crosses over into the neighboring Tønsberg Municipality.

The village of Åsgårdstrand was established as a ladested (small town/seaport) in 1650. On 1 January 1838, the small town was established as a municipality (see formannskapsdistrikt law). On 1 January 1965, Åsgårdstrand was merged with Borre Municipality plus a small area of Sem Municipality to form the new Borre Municipality (the name was later changed to Horten Municipality). After the merger, Åsgårdstrand lost its status as a ladested (small town/seaport). On 1 January 2010, the council for Horten Municipality formally designated Åsgardstrand as a town (Norwegian: by).

Åsgårdsstrand is a summer resort destination with a number of restored old homes. It is home to various cafés, galleries, and a beach. Edvard Munch’s former home is now owned by the municipality and open to the public. It is also home to Borre Kystled, a hiking trail which leads to Borre National Park.

== History ==
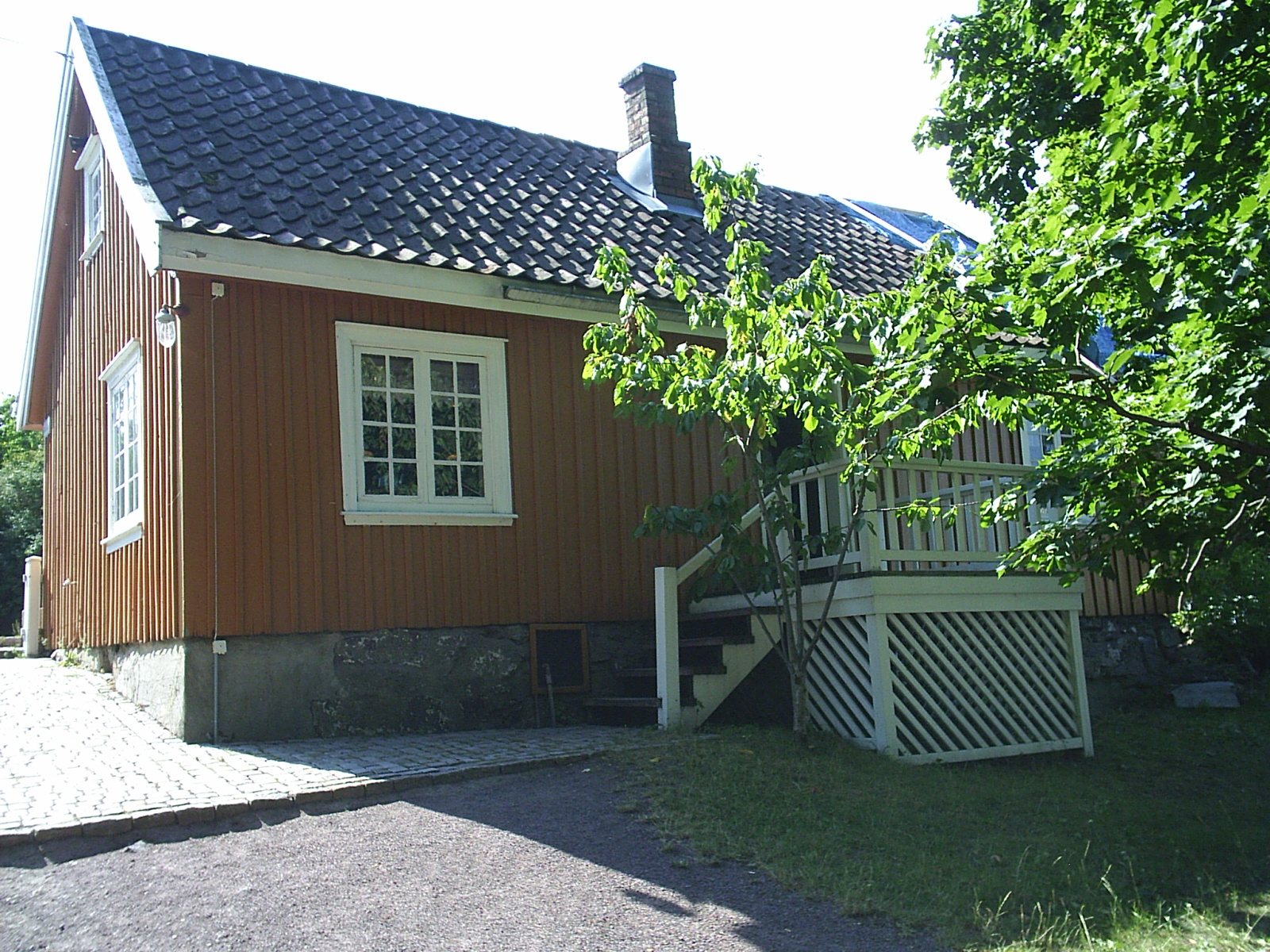
Edvard Munch's house

Åsgårdstrand was designated as a ladested (seaport/center of trade) in 1650 under the town of Tønsberg. In 1660 it was administratively transferred to being under the supervision of the town of Holmestrand. In 1752, the town was given the rights of doing business with national goods. From the beginning of the 19th century, Åsgårdstrand, was a lively export harbor for lumber, of which most was exported to the Netherlands. By the end of the sailing ship era, the trade stagnated. On 1 January 1838, Åsgårdstrand became a self-governing urban municipality under the newly-passed formannskapsdistrikt law. Merchant and ship owner Anders Riddervold was elected as the first mayor.

Dating from the 1880s, the town had been increasingly known as an important center for artists and painters. A number of internationally noted painters has either visited or lived in the town including Edvard Munch, Christian Krohg, and Hans Heyerdahl. In 1898, Edvard Munch bought a house in Åsgårdstrand, currently the Munch's House, where he spent the first of many summers (the house is now operated as a small museum which is associated with the Vestfold Museum).

Since the 1920s, Åsgårdstrand has been a popular vacation and recreational spot. Visitors come to the small town each summer and spend their holidays in one of the four hotels. In 2007, the town was designated as a "Tourist Town", which gives the shop owners in the oldest part closest to the sea the right to stay open every day of the week. In order to become a Tourist Town the number of visitors needs to greatly exceed the number of residents throughout the year. In June every year, Åsgårdstrand celebrates Midsummer (the longest day of the year) with a large fire on the shore.

Coat of arms (1950–1965)

=== Coat of arms ===
The coat of arms was granted on 1 January 1950. The blazon is "Gules, a mermaid argent" (Norwegian: På rødt, en sølv havfrue). This means the arms have a red field (background) and the charge is a mermaid. The mermaid has a tincture of argent which means it is commonly colored white, but if it is made out of metal, then silver is used.

=== Name ===
The town (and municipality) is named after the old Aasgaarden farm (Old Norse: Ásgarðr). The first element is the accusative case of the word áss which means "rocky ridge" which likely refers to the farm's location on Raet. The last element is garðr which means "farm" or "dwelling". The suffix strand means "beach". Thus the name means something like the "beach belonging to the farm on the rocky ridge."

On 21 December 1917, a royal resolution enacted the 1917 Norwegian language reforms. Prior to this change, the name was spelled Aasgaardstrand with the digraph "Aa" and "aa", and after this reform, the name was spelled Åsgårdstrand, using the letters Å and å instead.

== Municipal self-government (1838–1965) ==
=== Administrative history ===
The formannskapsdistrikt law of 1837 created a system of local government in Norway by establishing each town (ladested or kjøpstad) and each Church of Norway prestegjeld as a civil municipality. On 1 January 1838, the 0.18-square-kilometre (44-acre) ladested of Aasgaardstrand was established as Aasgaardstrand Municipality (later spelled Åsgårdstrand).

During the 1960s, there were many municipal mergers across Norway due to the work of the Schei Committee. On 1 January 1964, Åsgårdstrand Municipality was dissolved and the following areas were merged to form an enlarged Borre Municipality:

- all of Åsgårdstrand Municipality (population: 488)
- all of Borre Municipality (population: 6,037)
- the Stang area of Sem Municipality (population: 126)

=== Government ===
While it existed, Åsgårdstrand Municipality was responsible for primary education (through 10th grade), outpatient health services, senior citizen services, welfare and other social services, zoning, economic development, and municipal roads and utilities. The municipality was governed by a municipal council of directly elected representatives. The mayor was indirectly elected by a vote of the municipal council. The municipality was under the jurisdiction of the Horten District Court and the Agder Court of Appeal.

=== Municipal council ===
The municipal council (Bystyre) of Åsgårdstrand Municipality was made up of representatives that were elected to four year terms. The tables below show the historical composition of the council by political party.

Åsgårdstrand bystyre 1963–1964
Party name (in Norwegian)	Number of representatives
Labour Party (Arbeiderpartiet)	5
Conservative Party (Høyre)	14
Local List(s) (Lokale lister)	2
Total number of members:	21
Note: On 1 January 1964, Åsgårdstrand Municipality became part of Borre Municipality.

Åsgårdstrand bystyre 1959–1963
Party name (in Norwegian)	Number of representatives
Labour Party (Arbeiderpartiet)	5
Conservative Party (Høyre)	14
Local List(s) (Lokale lister)	2
Total number of members:	21

Åsgårdstrand bystyre 1955–1959
Party name (in Norwegian)	Number of representatives
Labour Party (Arbeiderpartiet)	5
Conservative Party (Høyre)	14
Local List(s) (Lokale lister)	2
Total number of members:	21

Åsgårdstrand bystyre 1951–1955
Party name (in Norwegian)	Number of representatives
Labour Party (Arbeiderpartiet)	4
Conservative Party (Høyre)	16
Total number of members:	20

Åsgårdstrand bystyre 1947–1951
Party name (in Norwegian)	Number of representatives
Labour Party (Arbeiderpartiet)	5
Conservative Party (Høyre)	12
Local List(s) (Lokale lister)	3
Total number of members:	20

Åsgårdstrand bystyre 1945–1947
Party name (in Norwegian)	Number of representatives
Labour Party (Arbeiderpartiet)	5
Joint List(s) of Non-Socialist Parties (Borgerlige Felleslister)	15
Total number of members:	20

Åsgårdstrand bystyre 1937–1941*
Party name (in Norwegian)	Number of representatives
Labour Party (Arbeiderpartiet)	2
Joint List(s) of Non-Socialist Parties (Borgerlige Felleslister)	18
Total number of members:	20
Note: Due to the German occupation of Norway during World War II, no elections were held for new municipal councils until after the war ended in 1945.

Åsgårdstrand bystyre 1934–1937
Party name (in Norwegian)	Number of representatives
Labour Party (Arbeiderpartiet)	1
Joint List(s) of Non-Socialist Parties (Borgerlige Felleslister)	19
Total number of members:	20

=== Mayors ===
The mayor (Norwegian: ordfører) of Åsgårdstrand Municipality was the political leader of the municipality and the chairperson of the municipal council. The following people have held this position:

- 1838–1838: Anders Riddervold
- 1839–1840: Jacob Skjelderup Bache
- 1841–1844: Andreas Næss
- 1845–1845: Jacob Skjelderup Bache
- 1846–1846: Johan Wesmann
- 1847–1849: Andreas Næss
- 1850–1851: Johan Wesmann
- 1854–1854: Anders Olaus Moldenhauer
- 1855–1856: Niels Christian Nielsen
- 1857–1857: H. Rumi
- 1858–1858: Niels Christian Nielsen
- 1859–1859: Anders Olaus Moldenhauer
- 1860–1877: Carl August Folcker
- 1878–1886: Niels Christian Nielsen (H)
- 1887–1887: Lauritz Isaksen
- 1888–1888: Enoch Svensen
- 1889–1889: Lauritz Isaksen
- 1890–1896: Eilert Martin Evensen
- 1897–1897: Nils O. Semb (H)
- 1898–1898: Eilert Martin Evensen
- 1899–1900: Nils O. Semb (H)
- 1901–1904: Bredo F. Thurmann Nielsen (H)
- 1905–1905: Preben Crøger Gjertsen
- 1906–1906: L. M. Larsen
- 1907–1907: Preben Crøger Gjertsen
- 1908–1909: Johan Arnt Hansen
- 1910–1910: I. G. Carlsen
- 1911–1913: Johan Arnt Hansen
- 1914–1916: Gustav Ernst Ramm (H)
- 1917–1919: Edvard Christian Sperre
- 1920–1922: Gustav Ernst Ramm (H)
- 1923–1923: Herman Olaussen Hassum
- 1924–1925: Edvard Christian Sperre
- 1926–1936: Jens Hedvin Jacobsen (H)
- 1937–1945: James Russell Johansen (H/NS)
- 1945–1945: Kaspar Lie Mathisen (V)
- 1946–1948: August F. Christensen (H)
- 1949–1949: Frode Chr. Brekke (H)
- 1950–1951: August F. Christensen (H)
- 1952–1960: Rolf Helland Larsen (H)
- 1960–1963: Odd Aasen (H)
- 1963–1964: Rolf Helland Larsen (H)

== Notable people ==
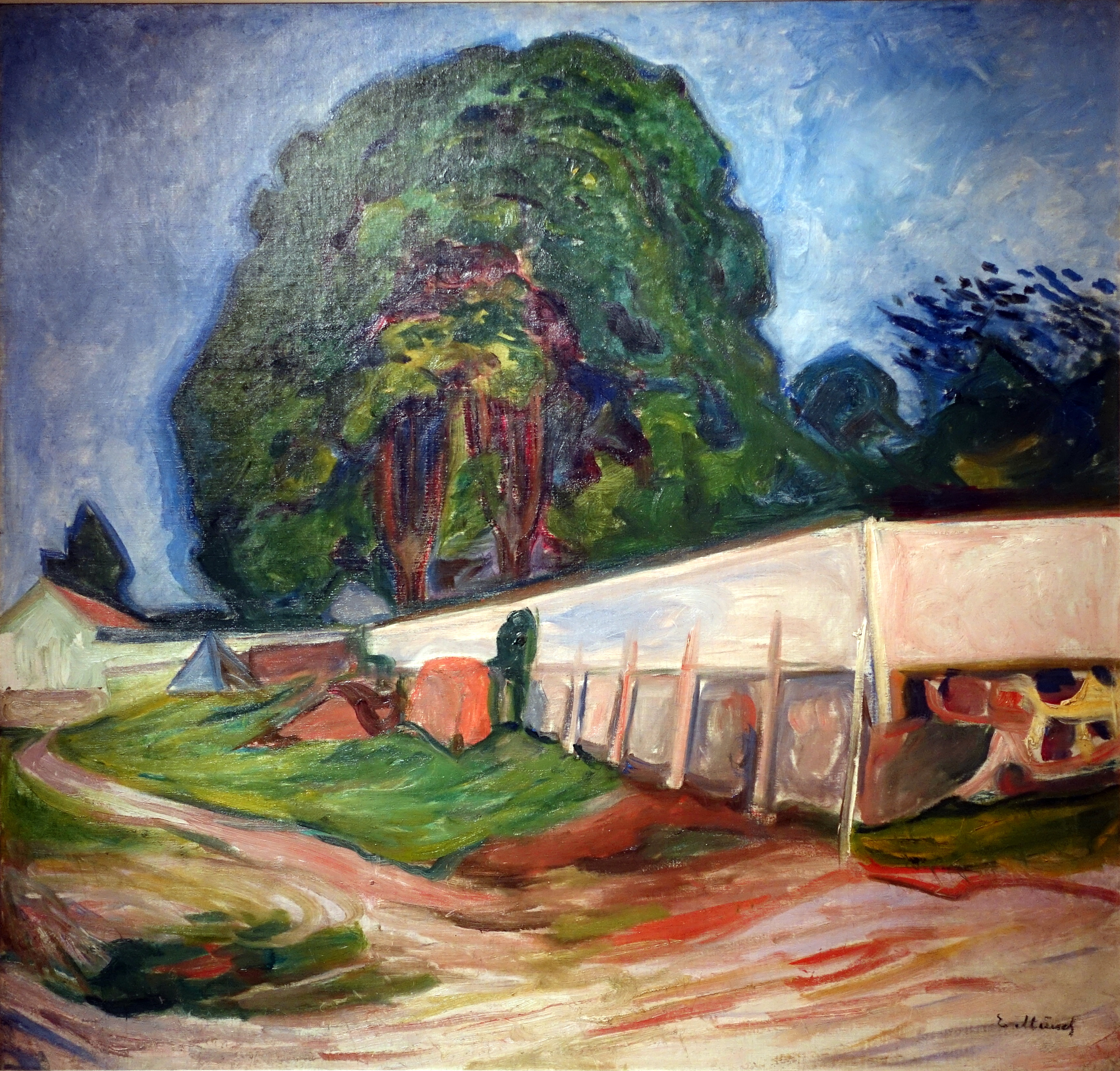
Summer Night at Åsgårdstrand Credit: Edvard Munch (1904)

- Hans Anton Apeness (1842–1930), a lumber merchant born in Åsgårdstrand (a street in Calais has been named after him)
- Hans Heyerdahl (1857–1913), an art painter who lived in Åsgårdstrand
- Per Lasson Krohg (1889–1965), an art painter born in Åsgårdstrand (son of Oda and Christian Krohg)
- Svein Døvle Larssen (born 1928), a former editor of Tønsbergs Blad who lives in Åsgårdstrand
- Edvard Munch (1863–1944), an art painter with a summer house in Åsgårdstrand
- Ola Abrahamsson (1883–1980), an art painter with a summer house in Åsgårdstrand (a street in Åsgårdstrand was named after him)
- Nils Johan Semb (born 1959), a Norwegian national soccer team head coach from 1998–2003 who lives in Åsgårdstrand

== See also ==
- List of towns and cities in Norway
- List of former municipalities of Norway
