= Munch's House =

Historic house museum in Norway

- Munchs hus
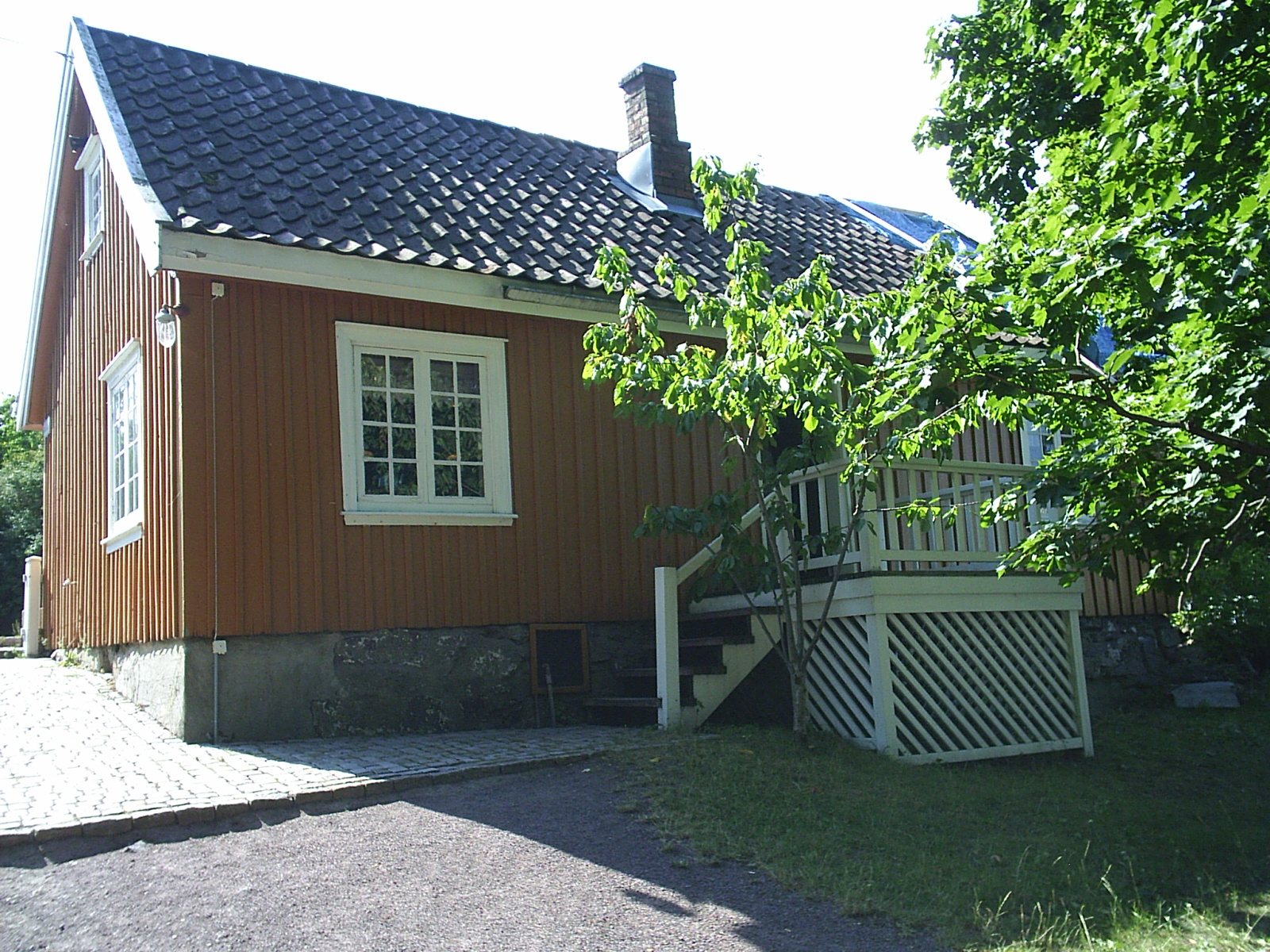
- The small beach house bought by Munch in 1898
- Interactive fullscreen map
- Established: 1947
- Location: Åsgårdstrand, Norway
- Coordinates: 59°21′08″N 10°28′03″E
- Type: Historic house museum
- Owner: Vestfolt Museums
- Website: vestfoldmuseene.no/munchs-hus/

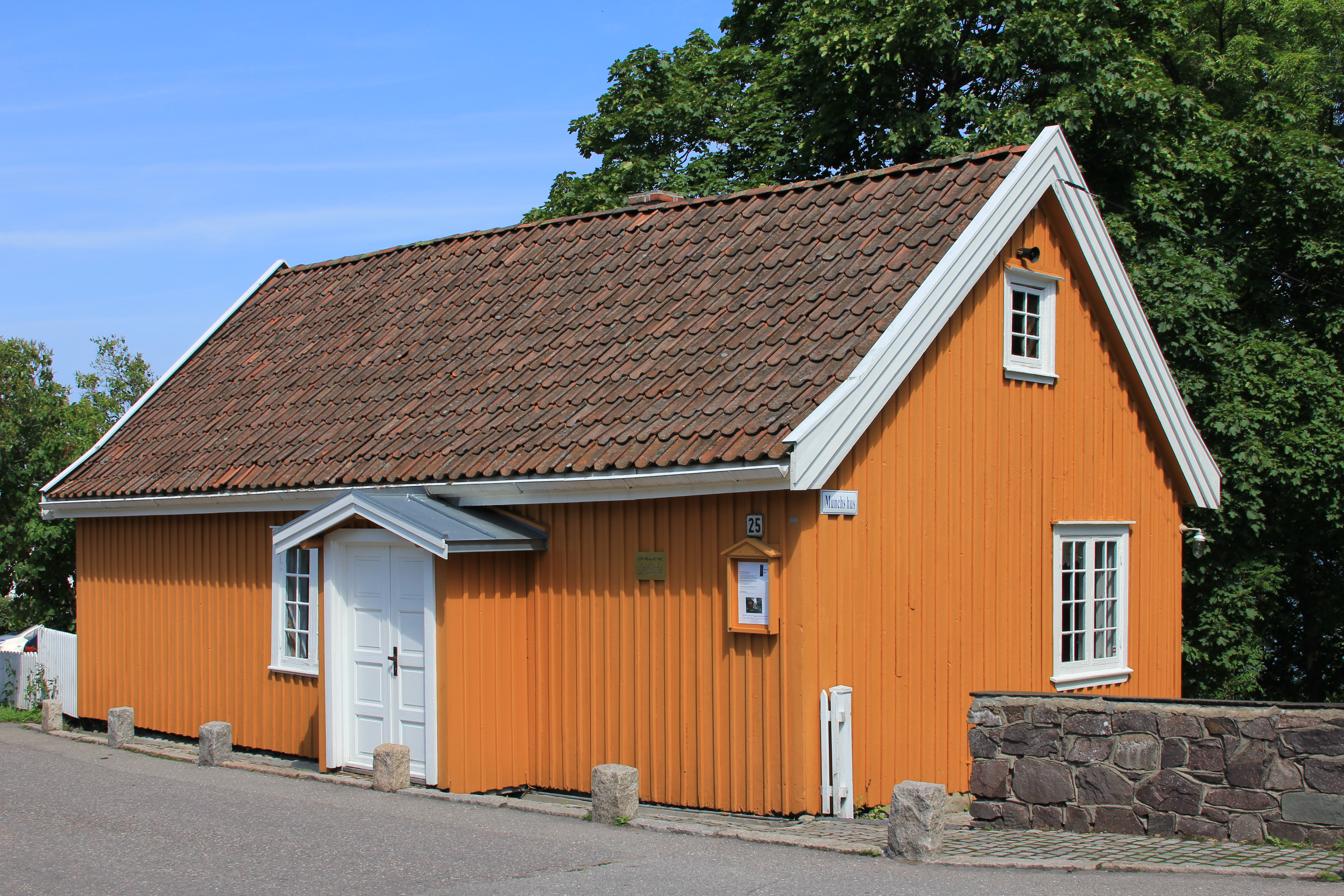
View of Munch's House

Munch's House (Norwegian: Munchs hus), or Nygårdsgrunn, is a historic beach house museum in Åsgårdstrand, in Horten Municipality, Norway. It is preserved as a small artist's museum dedicated to the painter Edvard Munch, since he spent long periods of time there. Munch first came to Åsgårdstrand in 1885, with his family, and stayed in this town for most summers until 1905. He himself bought the house in 1898. Until 1905 he visited it regularly, later it would be more sporadically.

== History ==
The main house can be documented back to 1830, through a so-called land deed, but it is probably older. The fisherman Hans Hansen Bollerød owned it from 1845 until his death in 1895. Munch bought the house from his son, Adolf Hansen Bollerød, in 1898, for 900 kroner.

Munch's studio was in a separate house that he had built on the site. It was later demolished, but it has since been rebuilt as it formerly was.

The house itself is depicted in Munch's art, and a number of his famous paintings were made here; they include the seven variations of Young Girls on a Bridge, and the five variations of Women on a Bridge. Other paintings, including Melancholy (1892), The Voice (1892), and Jealousy (1895), were also painted in or have motifs from Åsgårdstrand. The bridge that Munch painted was demolished as early as 1904, and a breakwater was subsequently built in the same place.

After Munch's death in 1944, the municipality bought the house from his sister Inger, who had inherited it. The house opened as a museum in 1947. Today, Nygårdsgrunn is one of the two museums in Norway dedicated to Munch.

The Munch House Museum is a department of the Vestfold Museums. The property has been protected by the Norwegian Ministry of Cultural Heritage since 2013.

== See also ==
- List of single-artist museums
