= Børre =

Børre is a Norwegian given name, and may refer to:

- Børre Dalhaug (born 1974), Norwegian musician and arranger
- Børre Falkum-Hansen (1919–2006), Norwegian sailor and Olympic medalist
- Egil Børre Johnsen (born 1936), Norwegian writer
- Børre Knudsen (1937–2014), Norwegian Lutheran minister
- Fred Børre Lundberg (born 1969), former Nordic combined skier from Norway
- Børre Næss (born 1982), Norwegian cross-country skier who has competed since 2002
- Børre Rognlien (born 1944), Norwegian sports official and politician
- Børre Rønningen (born 1949), Norwegian politician
- Børre Sæthre (born 1967), Norwegian artist
- Odd Børre Sørensen (1939–2023), Norwegian pop singer
- Børre Steenslid (born 1985), Norwegian professional footballer

== See also ==
- Borre (disambiguation)
