= Jarlsberg =

Jarlsberg may refer to:

- Jarlsberg (countship), a former county of Norway
- Counts of Wedel-Jarlsberg
- Jarlsberg cheese
- Jarlsberg Avis, a newspaper
- Jarlsberg Manor
- Jarlsberg Travbane, a horse racing track
- Jarlsberg Tunnel
- Tønsberg Airport, Jarlsberg
- Vestfold was until 1919 known as Jarlsberg and Larvik County
- Wedel Jarlsberg Land in Svalbard
