= Nykirke =

Village in Horten, Norway

- Village
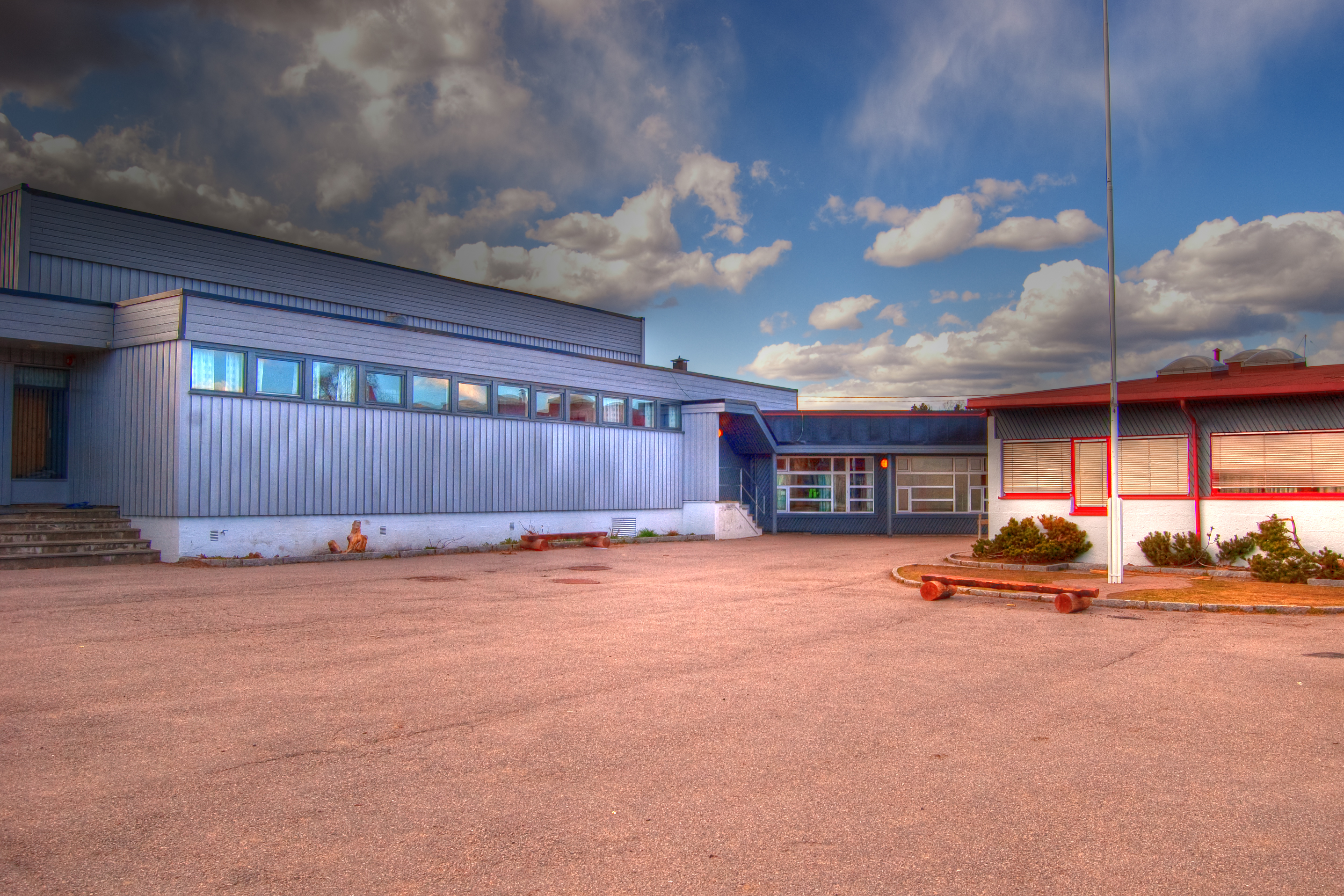
- View of the village school
- Interactive map of Nykirke
- Coordinates: 59.42414°N 10.38383°E
- Country: Norway
- Region: Eastern Norway
- County: Vestfold
- District: Jarlsberg
- Municipality: Horten Municipality

Area
  - Total: 0.54 km^{2} (0.21 sq mi)
- Elevation: 79 m (259 ft)

Population (2026)
  - Total: 744
  - Density: 1,378/km^{2} (3,570/sq mi)
- Time zone: UTC+01:00 (CET)
  - Summer (DST): UTC+02:00 (CEST)
- Post Code: 3180 Nykirke

Nykirke (lit. 'new church') is a village in Horten Municipality in Vestfold county, Norway. The village is located along the European route E18 about 7 kilometres (4.3 mi) to the west of the town of Horten, about 8 kilometres (5.0 mi) to the south of the town of Holmestrand, and about 5 kilometres (3.1 mi) to the north of the village of Skoppum.

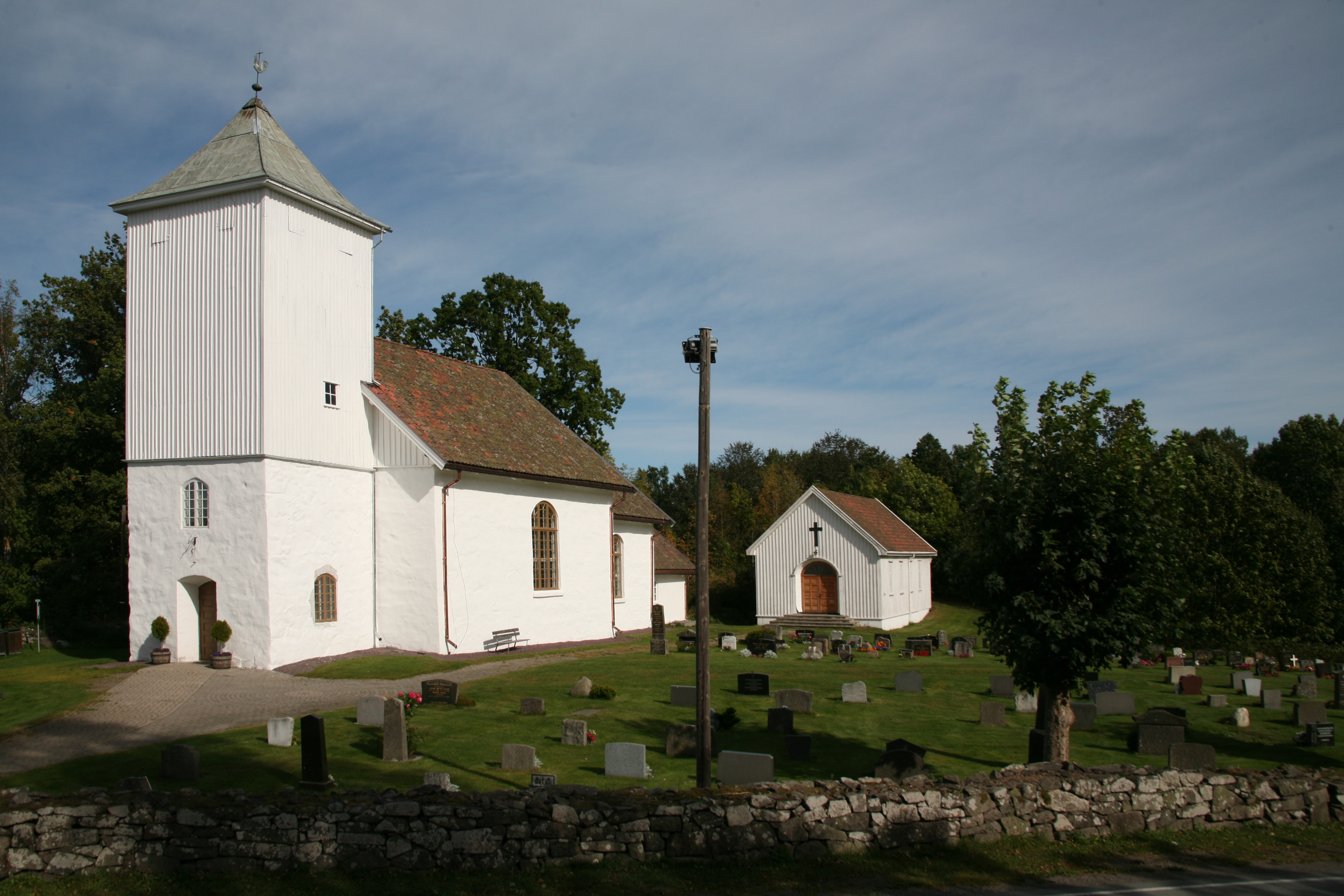
Nykirke Church

The 0.54-square-kilometre (130-acre) village has a population (2026) of 744 and a population density of 1,378 inhabitants per square kilometre (3,570/sq mi).

The medieval Nykirke Church is located in the village.

== Notable people ==
- Jørgen Jalland, a footballer
- Olaf Tufte, a competition rower and two-time Olympic gold medalist
