= Borre, Norway =

Village in Horten, Norway

Borre
- Village
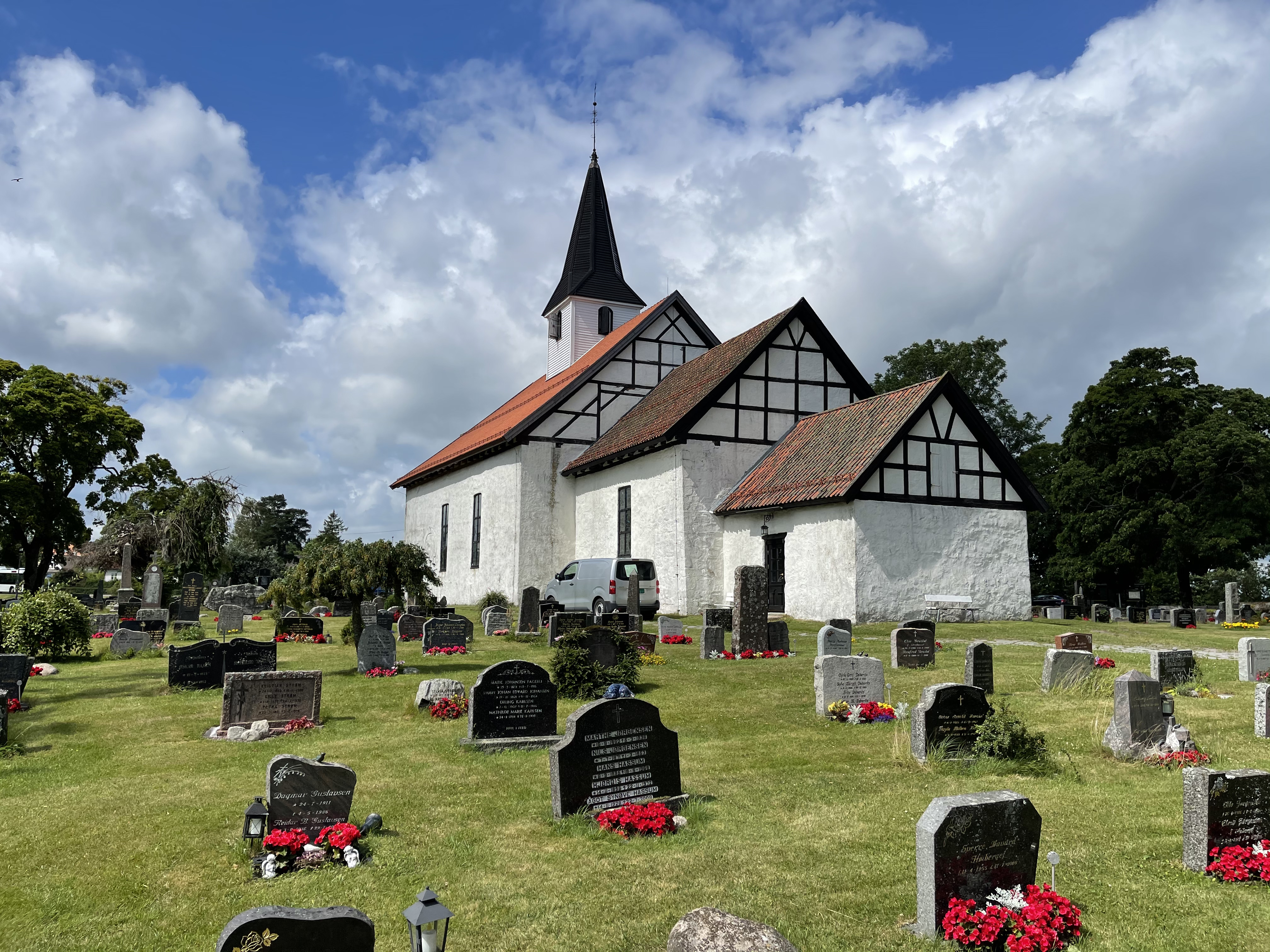
- View of the village church, Borre Church
- Interactive map of Borre
- Coordinates: 59.38189°N 10.45646°E
- Country: Norway
- Region: Eastern Norway
- County: Vestfold
- District: Jarlsberg
- Municipality: Horten Municipality

Area
  - Total: 0.6 km^{2} (0.23 sq mi)
- Elevation: 33 m (108 ft)

Population (2013)
  - Total: 1,056
  - Density: 1,760/km^{2} (4,600/sq mi)
- Time zone: UTC+01:00 (CET)
  - Summer (DST): UTC+02:00 (CEST)
- Post Code: 3184 Borre

Borre is a village in Horten Municipality in Vestfold county, Norway. The village is located about 5 kilometres (3.1 mi) south of the town of Horten, along the shores of the Ytre Oslofjord. It sits about 4 kilometres (2.5 mi) north of the town of Åsgårdstrand and about 3 kilometres (1.9 mi) east of the village of Skoppum.

The 0.6-square-kilometre (150-acre) village had a population (2013) of 1,056 and a population density of 1,760 inhabitants per square kilometre (4,600/sq mi). Since 2013, the population and area data for this village area has not been separately tracked by Statistics Norway and it is considered part of the town of Horten.

== History ==
The village of Borre has been the site of the Borre Church and headquarters of the Borre prestegjeld (parish) for centuries. On 1 January 1838, the parish became a civil municipality after the passage of the formannskapsdistrikt law. The village became the administrative centre of the new Borre Municipality. In 1988, Borre Municipality was merged with the town of Horten and it became the new Borre Municipality. On 1 June 2002, the name of the municipality was changed to Horten Municipality, following a referendum held in conjunction with the 2001 parliamentary election. The referendum was a close call with 6,557 votes for the name Horten and 6,218 votes for Borre.

=== Name ===
The village is named Borre (Old Norse: Borró) since the first Borre Church was built there. The name has an uncertain meaning. The first element may derives from borð which means "side" or "edge" or from the word borg which means "castle" or "fortified place". The last element may come from ró which means "rest" or rá which means "corner".

== Attractions ==
=== Borrevatnet ===
The large lake Borrevannet lies about 1.5 kilometres (0.93 mi) north of the village. It is a large freshwater lake which measures 4 kilometres (2.5 miles) long and 800 metres (2,600 feet) wide (at its widest). At the south end is a designated bird sanctuary where you can see numerous water birds, waders, and many other bird types. The lake houses many varieties of fish including pike, perch, and eel. The association that manages the lake, Borrevannets Grundeierforegning, uses the fishing card sales to promote water quality improvement initiatives and fishing research projects. It is also possible to rent one of the privately owned cabins surrounding the lake such as the Asketun hytte. The lake is a reservoir for the nearby town of Horten. The pumping station is on the east side of the lake. The pumping station can be visited and it has an activity center which offers a large number of educational programs, primarily but not exclusively designed for schools.

=== Borre Church ===
The medieval Borre Church is located in the village.

=== Borre mounds ===
Borre National Park covers 182 decares (0.182 km^{2}; 45 acres) of land just east of the village. Its collection of burial mounds include a large collection of royal tombs. The park includes the Borre mound cemetery (Borrehaugene) from the Old Norse words borró and haugr meaning mound. The Borre style of Norse art is named after a boat grave from Borre.
