= Nykirke Church (Vestfold) =

Church in Vestfold, Norway

- Nykirke kirke
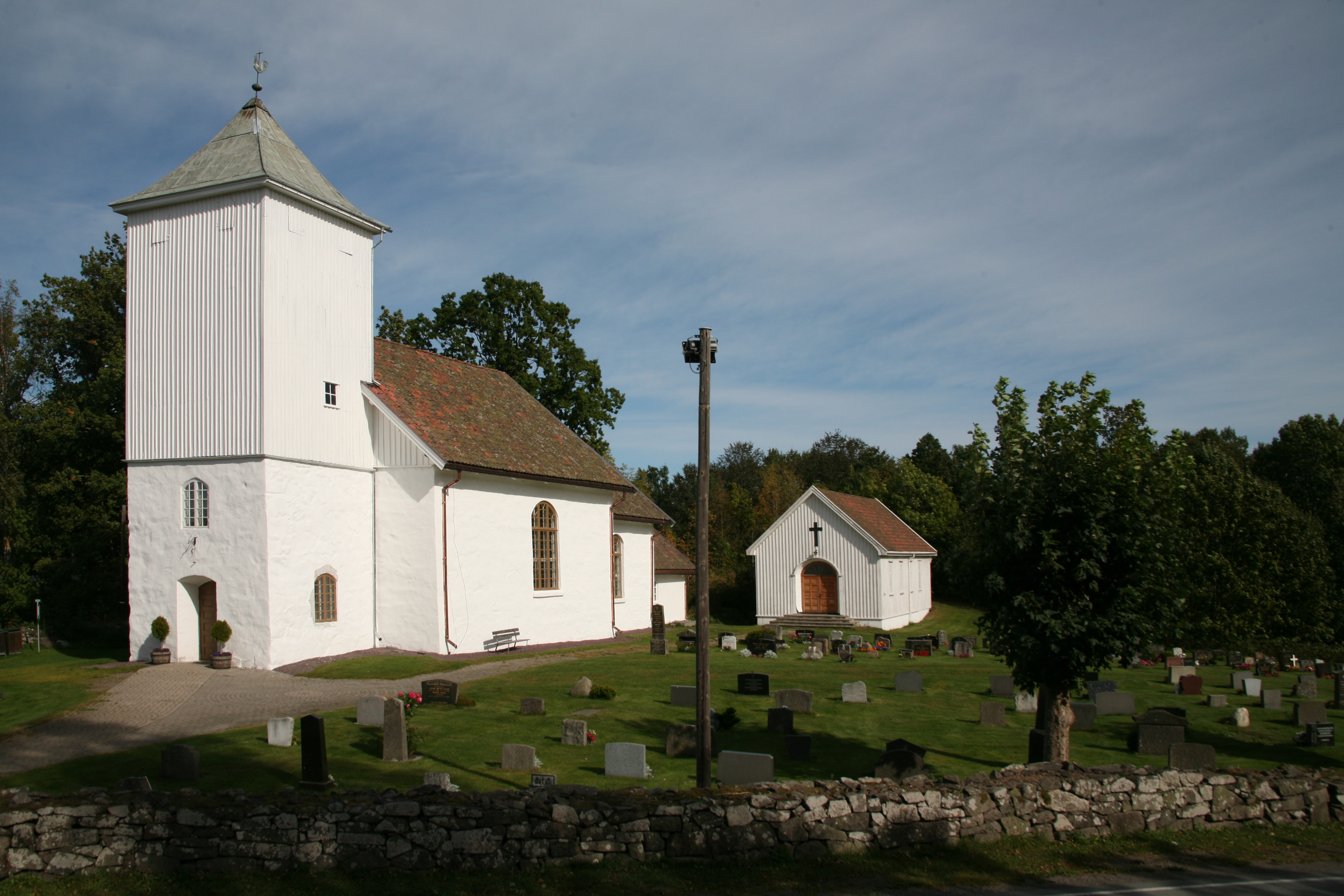
- View of the church
- Nykirke Church
- 59°25′22″N 10°23′01″E
- Location: Horten Municipality, Vestfold
- Country: Norway
- Denomination: Church of Norway
- Previous denomination: Catholic Church
- Churchmanship: Evangelical Lutheran

History
- Status: Parish church
- Founded: c. 1100
- Consecrated: c. 1100

Architecture
- Functional status: Active
- Architectural type: Long church
- Completed: c. 1100 (926 years ago)

Specifications
- Capacity: 140
- Materials: Stone

Administration
- Diocese: Tunsberg
- Deanery: Nord-Jarlsberg prosti
- Parish: Nykirke
- Norwegian Cultural Heritage Site
- Type: Church
- Status: Automatically protected
- ID: 85184

Nykirke Church (Norwegian: Nykirke kirke) is a parish church of the Church of Norway in Horten Municipality in Vestfold county, Norway. It is located in the village of Nykirke. It is the church for the Nykirke parish which is part of the Nord-Jarlsberg prosti (deanery) in the Diocese of Tunsberg. The white, stone church was built in a long church design around the year 1100 using plans drawn up by an unknown architect. The church seats about 140 people.

== History ==
The earliest existing historical records of the church date back to the year 1331, but the church was not built that year. The Romanesque stone church was likely built during the 12th century. The old church originally consisted of a rectangular nave and choir. The walls were made of stone and the gables were made of wood. In 1686, there was an extensive renovation of the building. In 1848, a wooden bell tower was built on the west end of the nave with a church porch on the main level. In 1881, the church was renovated again. This time a new sacristy was built on the east end of the choir and two levels of seating galleries were built along the west and north walls of the nave. In 1952–1953, the church was renovated again. This time the upper seating gallery was removed, leaving just one level of upper seating. Also in 1953, new pews were installed, parapets were made along all the walls, and the church got its current interior colours, which were retained during the next repainting in 1985. The church was restored again in 2003.

== Media gallery ==
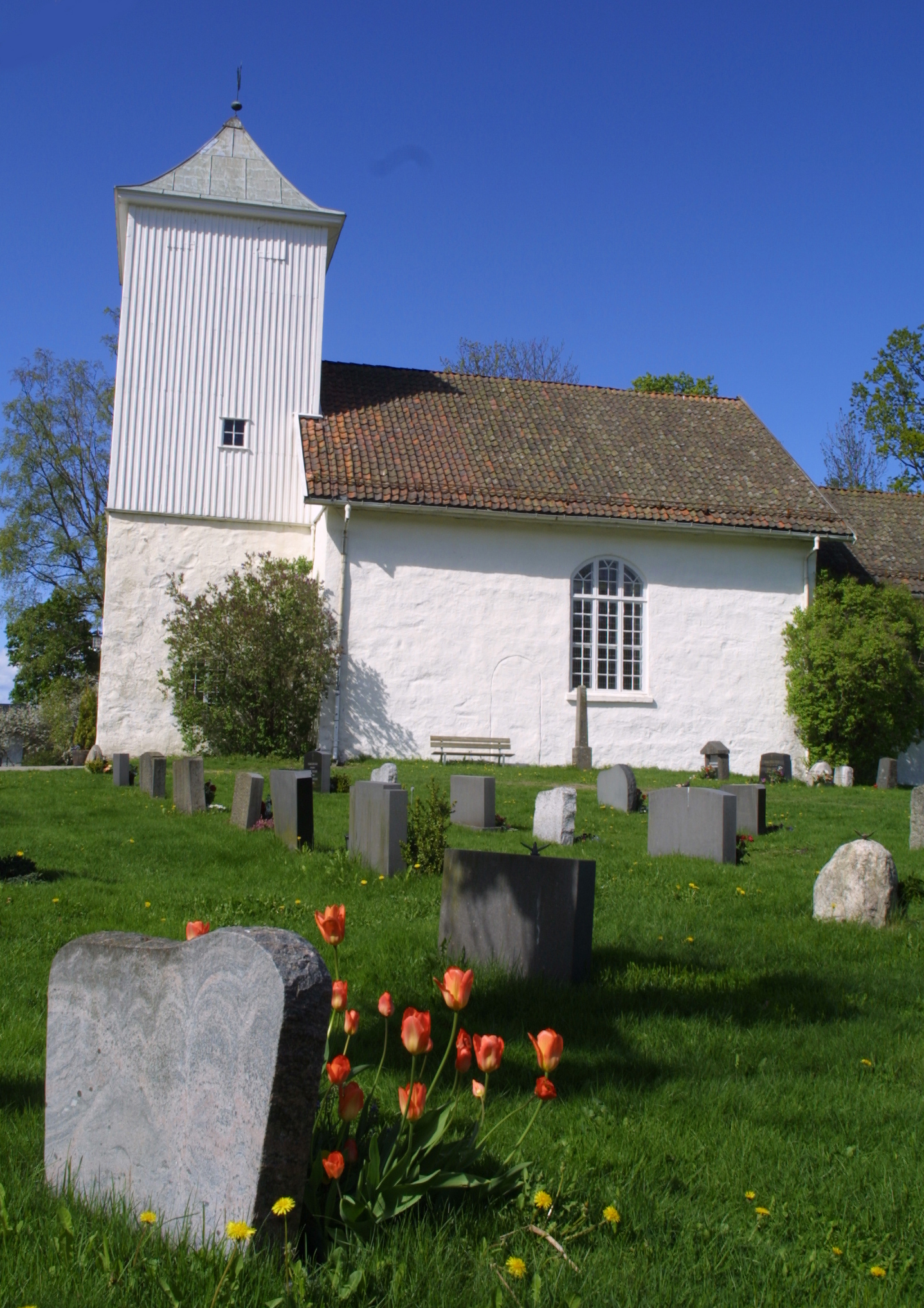

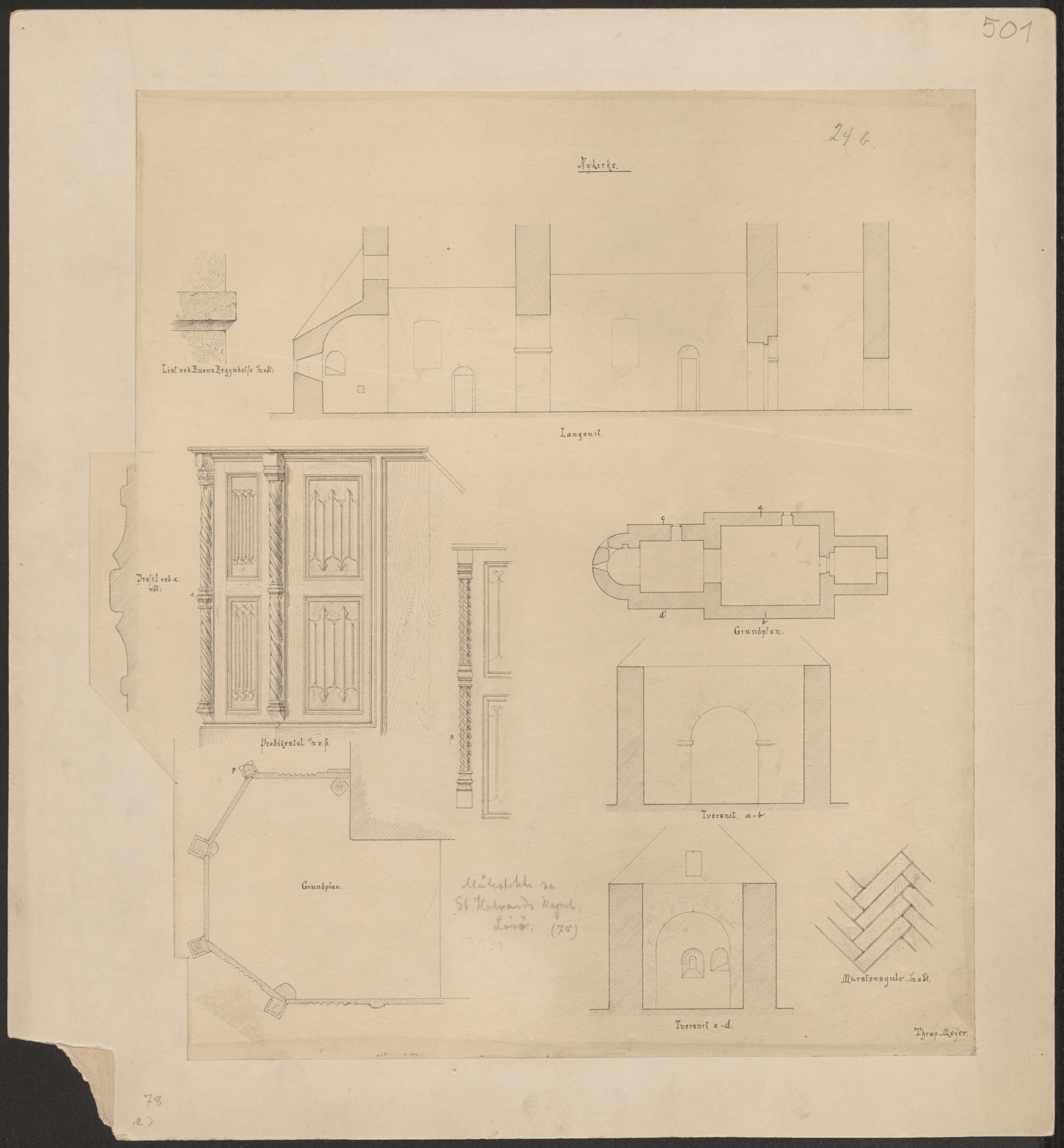

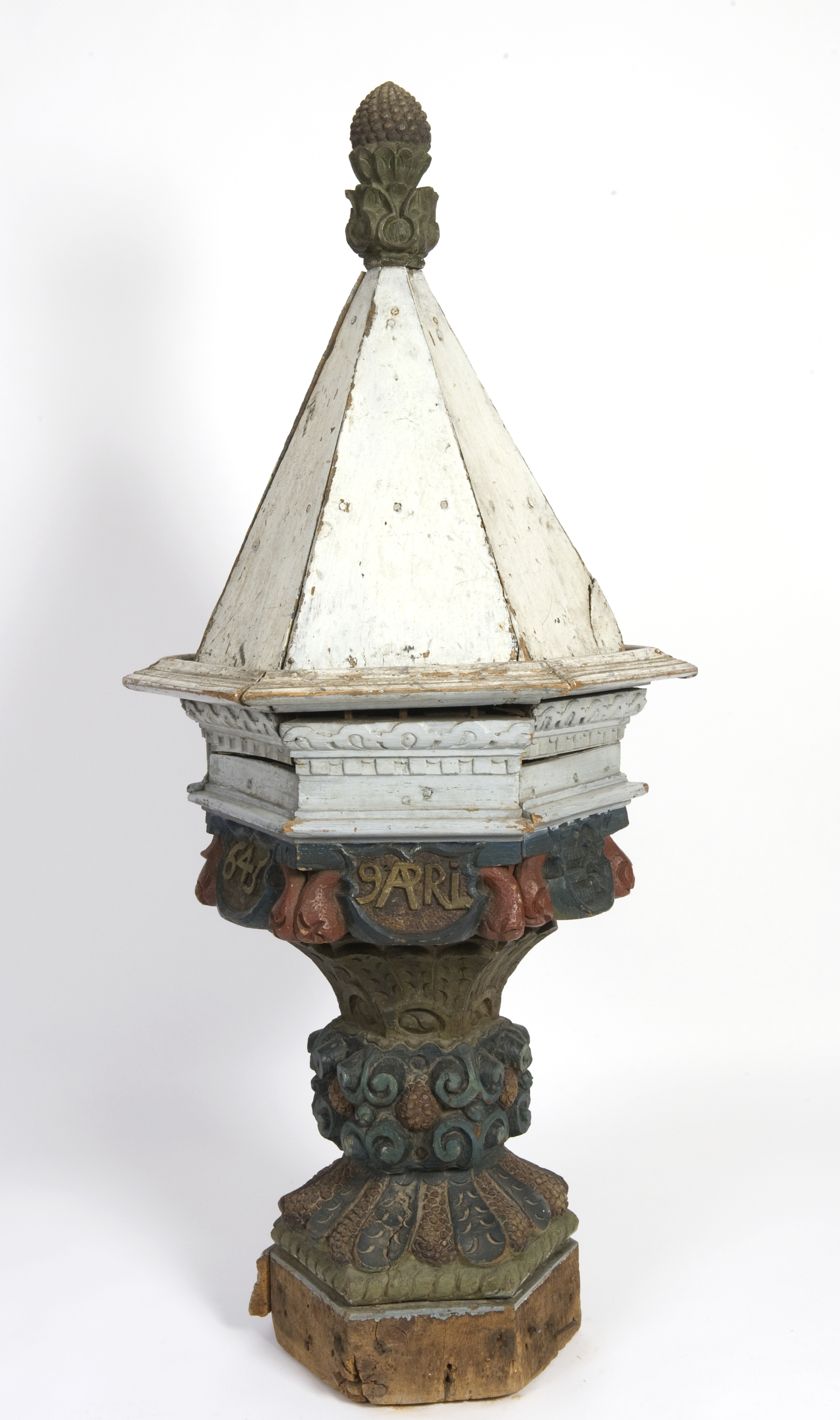

== See also ==
- List of churches in Tunsberg
