= Matthias Vanden Borre =

Belgian lawyer and politician

Mathias Vanden Borre (born 14 May 1987) is a Belgian lawyer and politician for the New Flemish Alliance.

Vanden Borre was born in Dundee, Scotland. He studied political science at KU Leuven and a master's degree in law at Ghent University. He then worked as a lawyer and an assistant to former N-VA leader Geert Bourgeois. Since 2018, he has been a municipal councilor in Brussels. In 2019, he was elected to the Parliament of the Brussels-Capital Region on second place on the N-VA's list.

In April 2021, Vanden Borre was assaulted by a gang while out walking in Brussels which left him with physical injuries.

Currently, Mathias Vanden Borre is involved in issues related to combating drug trafficking in Bruxelles, among other issues such as reducing poverty and improving the quality of life.
