= Borre Church =

Church in Vestfold, Norway

- Borre kirke
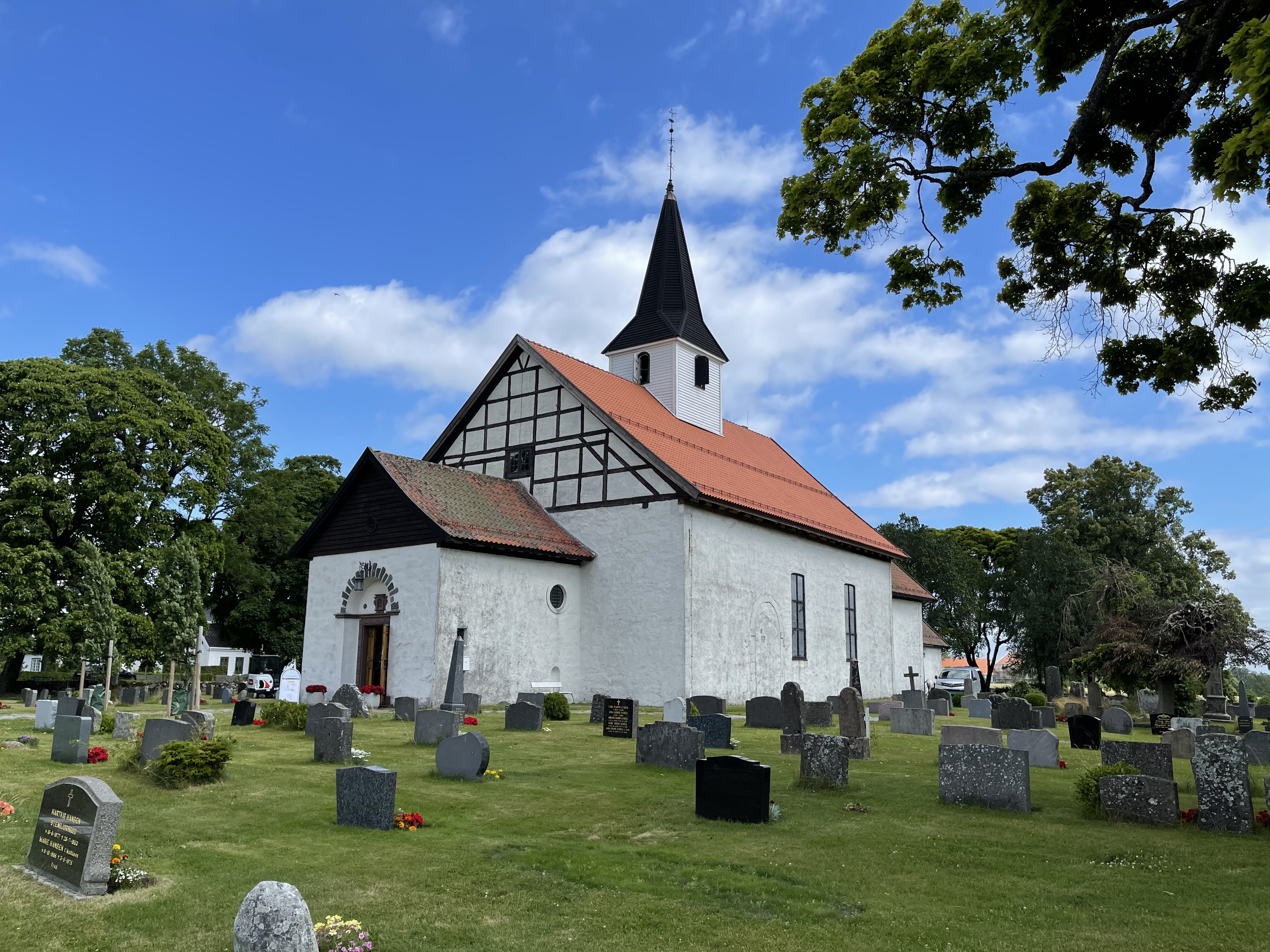
- View of the church
- Borre Church
- 59°22′56″N 10°27′35″E
- Location: Horten Municipality, Vestfold
- Country: Norway
- Denomination: Church of Norway
- Previous denomination: Catholic Church
- Churchmanship: Evangelical Lutheran

History
- Status: Parish church
- Founded: c. 1100
- Consecrated: c. 1100

Architecture
- Functional status: Active
- Architectural type: Long church
- Completed: c. 1100 (926 years ago)

Specifications
- Capacity: 300
- Materials: Stone

Administration
- Diocese: Tunsberg
- Deanery: Nord-Jarlsberg prosti
- Parish: Borre
- Norwegian Cultural Heritage Site
- Type: Church
- Status: Automatically protected
- ID: 75510

Borre Church (Norwegian: Borre kirke) is a parish church of the Church of Norway in Horten Municipality in Vestfold county, Norway. It is located in the village of Borre. It is one of the churches for the Borre parish which is part of the Nord-Jarlsberg prosti (deanery) in the Diocese of Tunsberg. The white, stone church was built in a long church design around the year 1100 using plans drawn up by an unknown architect. The church seats about 300 people.

== History ==
The earliest existing historical records of the church date back to the year 1315, but the church was not built that year. Tradition says the church was founded during the reign of Olav Kyrre (1067–1093). The first church on the site was likely a wooden post church. Around the year 1100, the wooden church was torn down and replaced with a new stone church. The church was built in a Romanesque style, i.e. round arches. It is a long church with a rectangular nave, a rectangular choir in the east. Originally, there was a portal on the south wall of the nave and a secondary portal on the south side of the chancel. The church, like many medieval churches, has no north windows. After some time, a sacristy was built on the east end of the choir. Later, a wooden church porch was built on the west end of the nave and that became the main entrance to the church, after that the old south portal was bricked up and closed.

In 1814, this church served as an election church (Norwegian: valgkirke). Together with more than 300 other parish churches across Norway, it was a polling station for elections to the 1814 Norwegian Constituent Assembly which wrote the Constitution of Norway. This was Norway's first national elections. Each church parish was a constituency that elected people called "electors" who later met together in each county to elect the representatives for the assembly that was to meet at Eidsvoll Manor later that year.

The church became the property of the Count of Jarlsberg in 1683. In 1899, the shipowner Christoffer Hannevig bought the church. He later gifted it on to the congregation. Like other old churches, Borre Church has undergone a number of changes over the years. The church underwent an extensive restoration in 1926–1928 according to plans by the architects Carl Buch and Lorentz Harboe Ree. Domenico Erdmann was the color consultant for the interior. The current church porch was built during this restoration, and the stairs up to the 2nd floor seating galleries were moved into the area of the new church porch. The project was financed by Sam Eyde.

== Media gallery ==
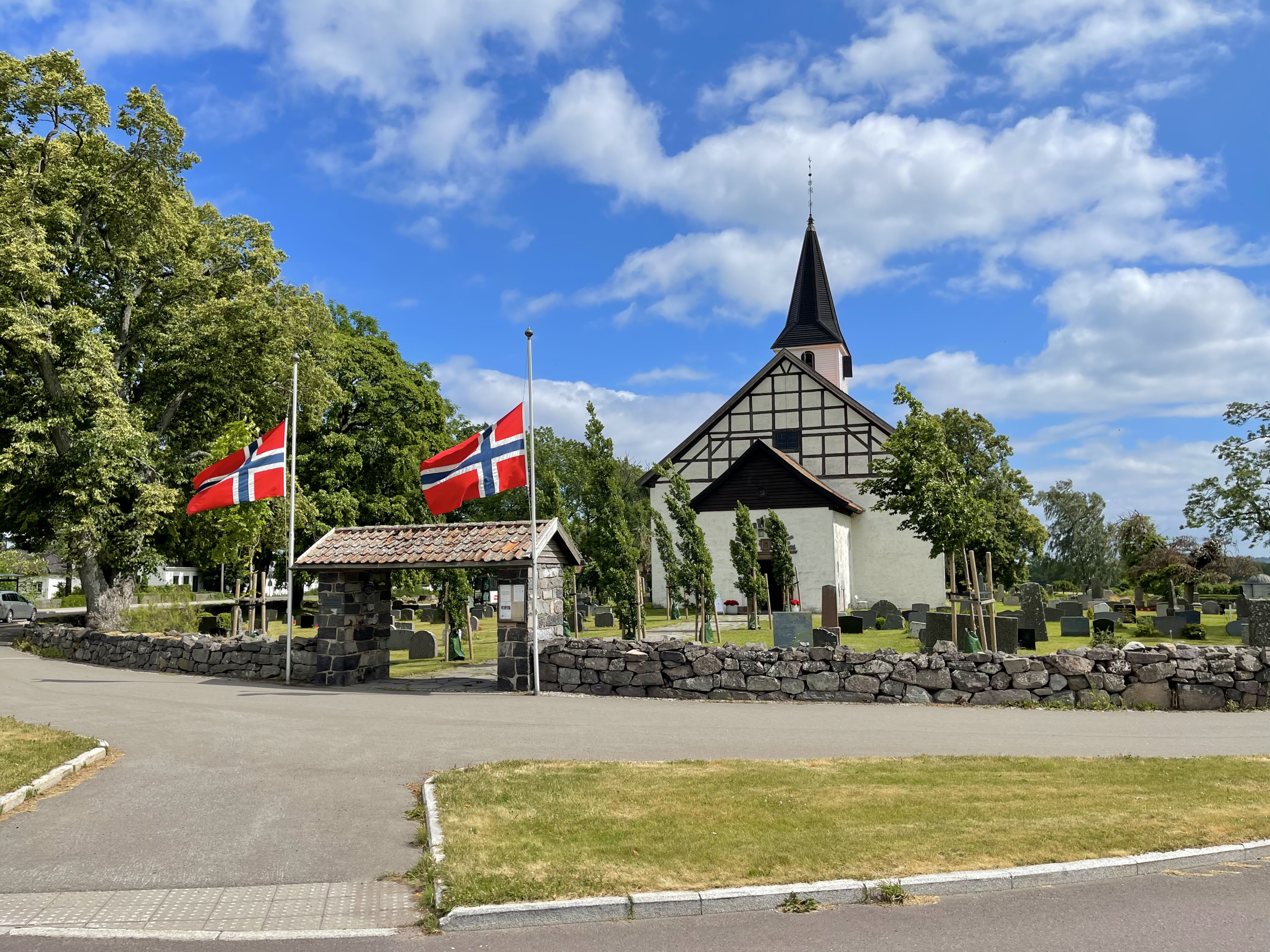

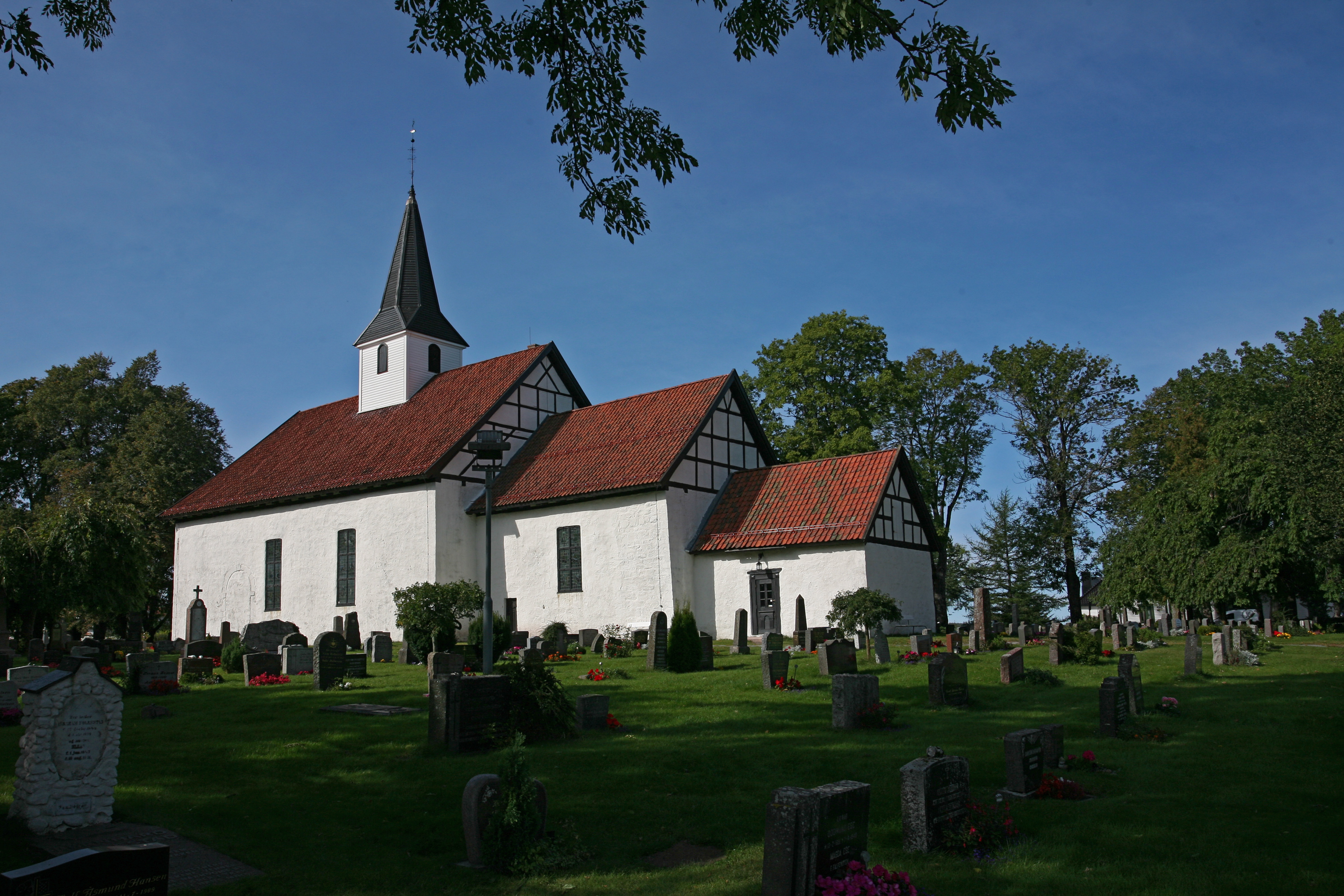

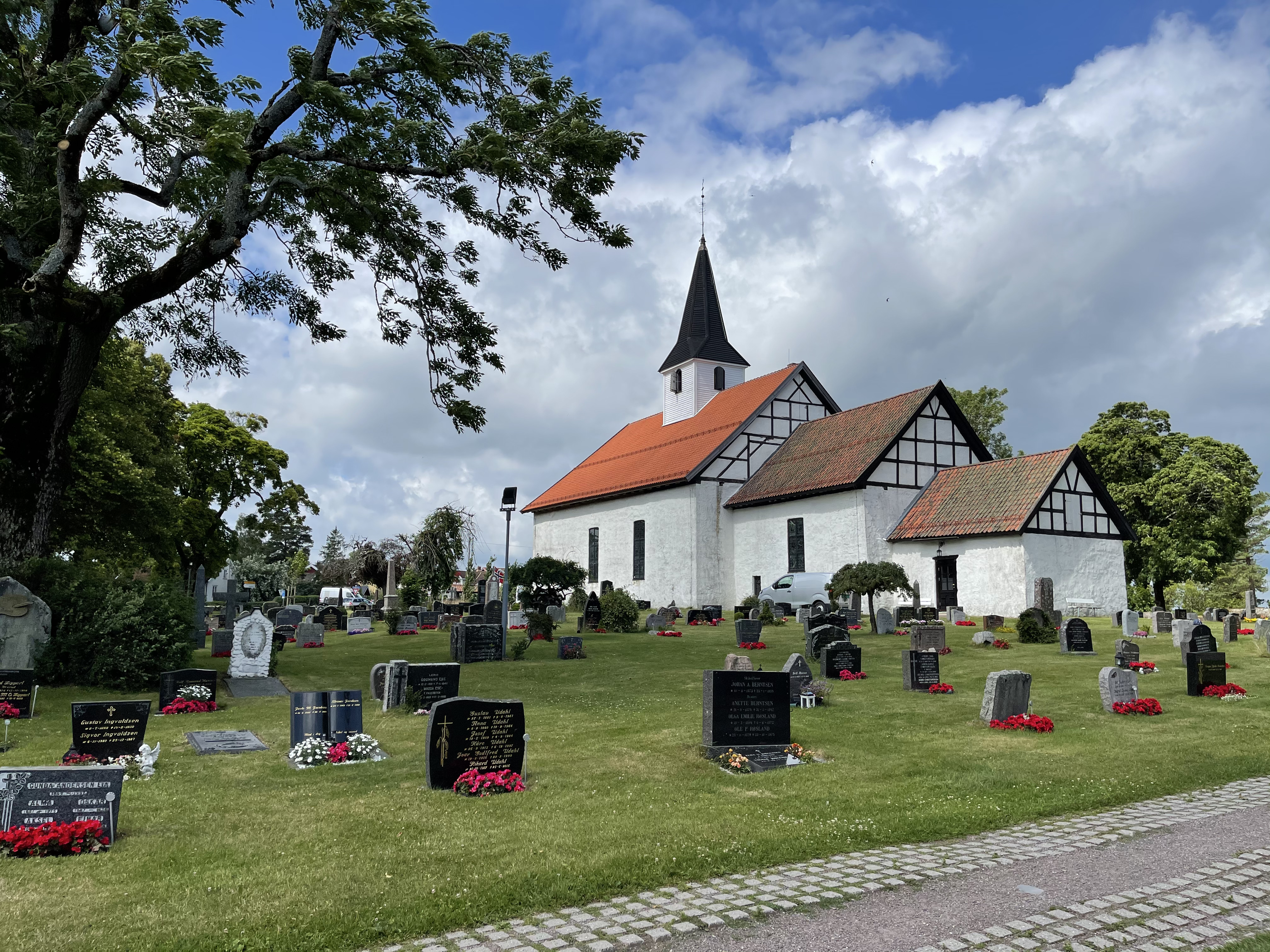

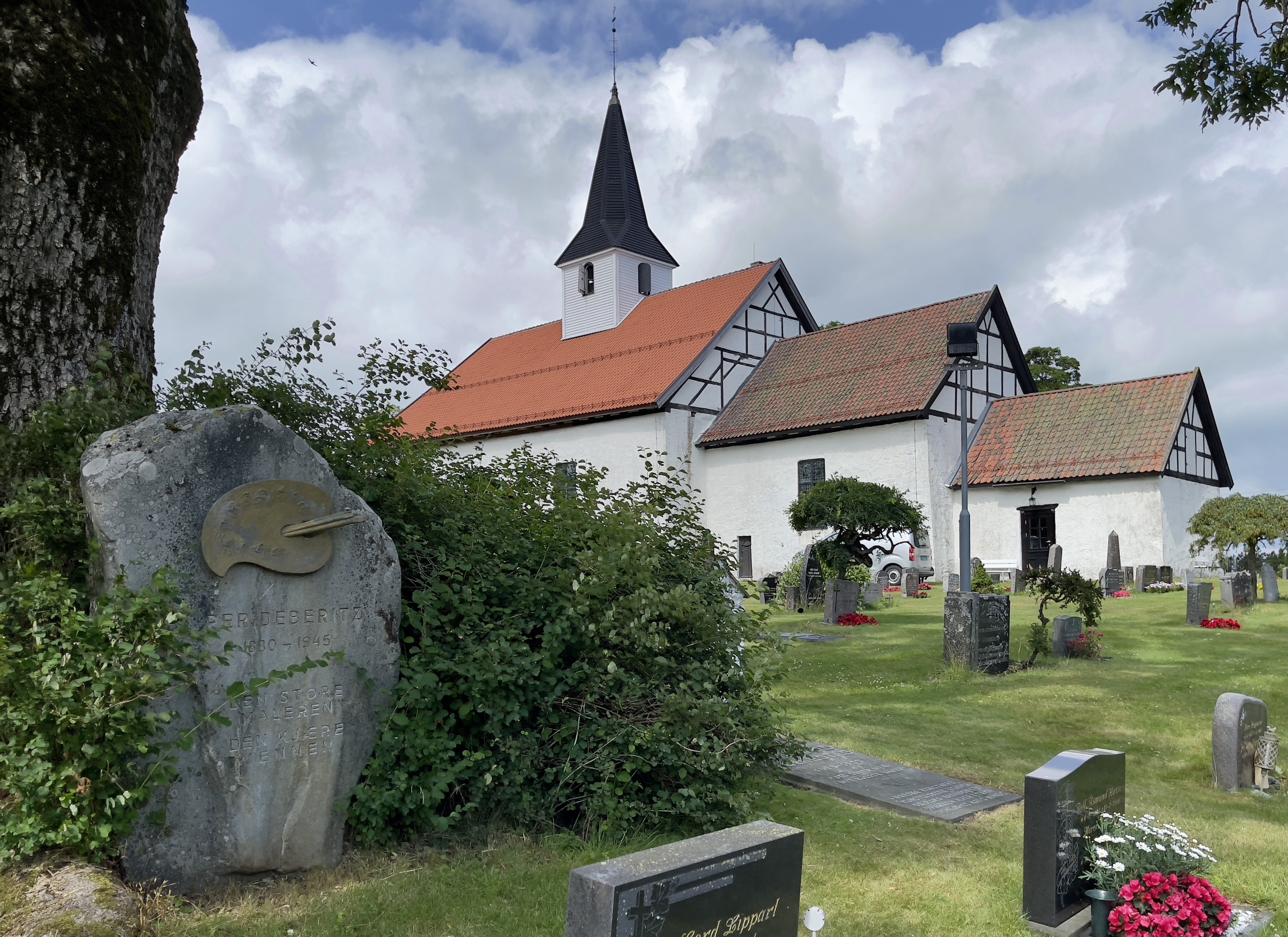

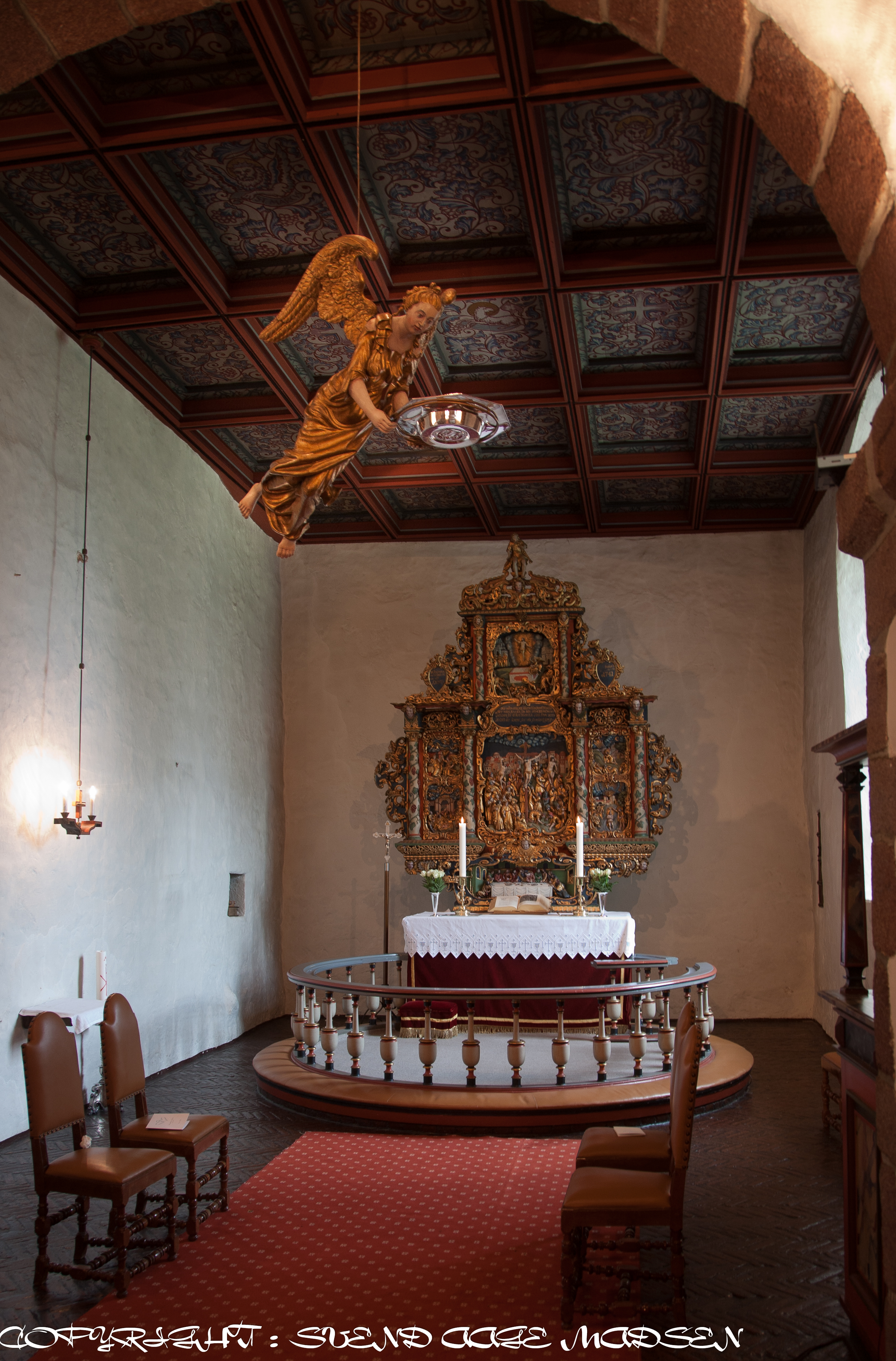

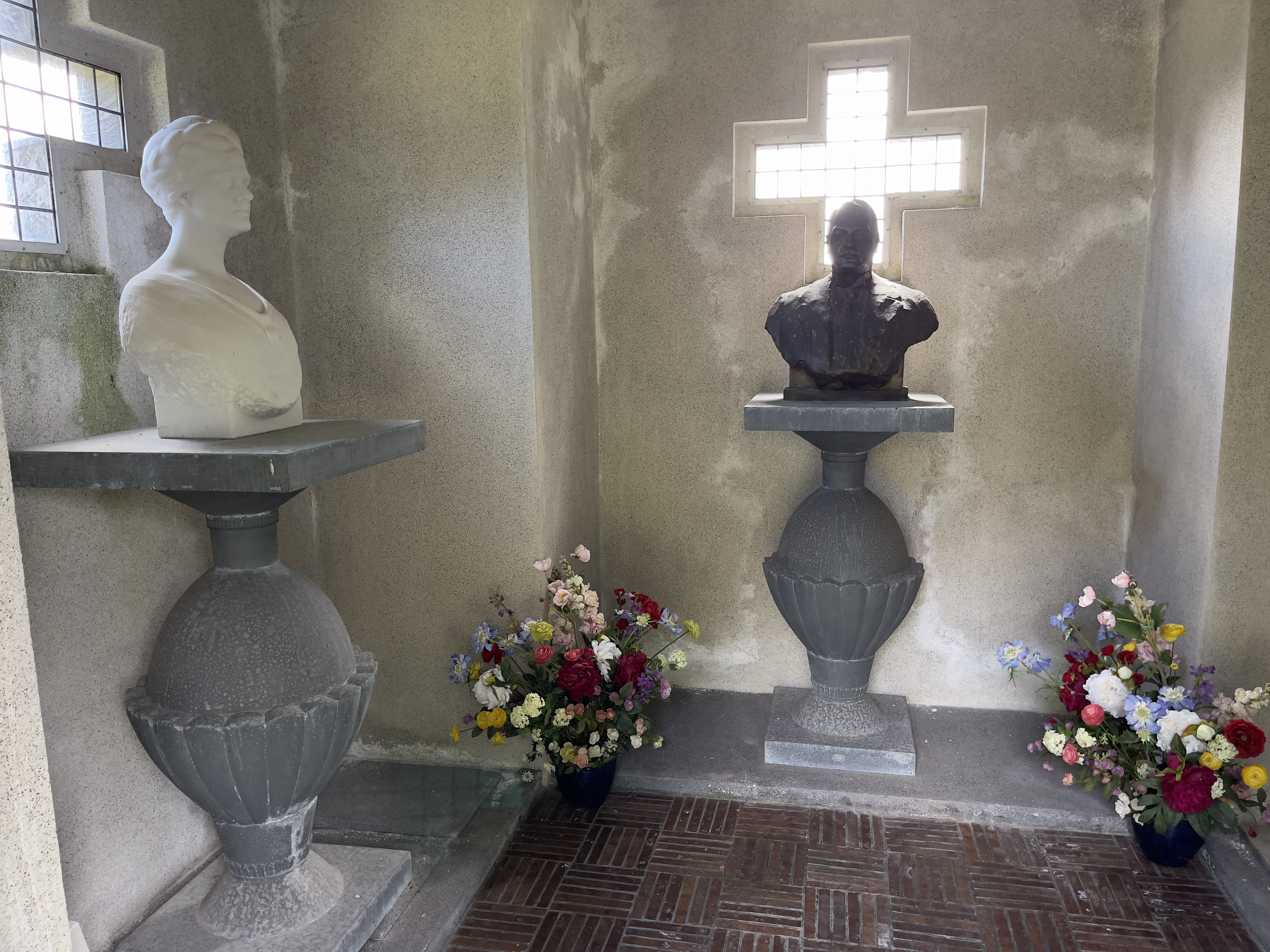

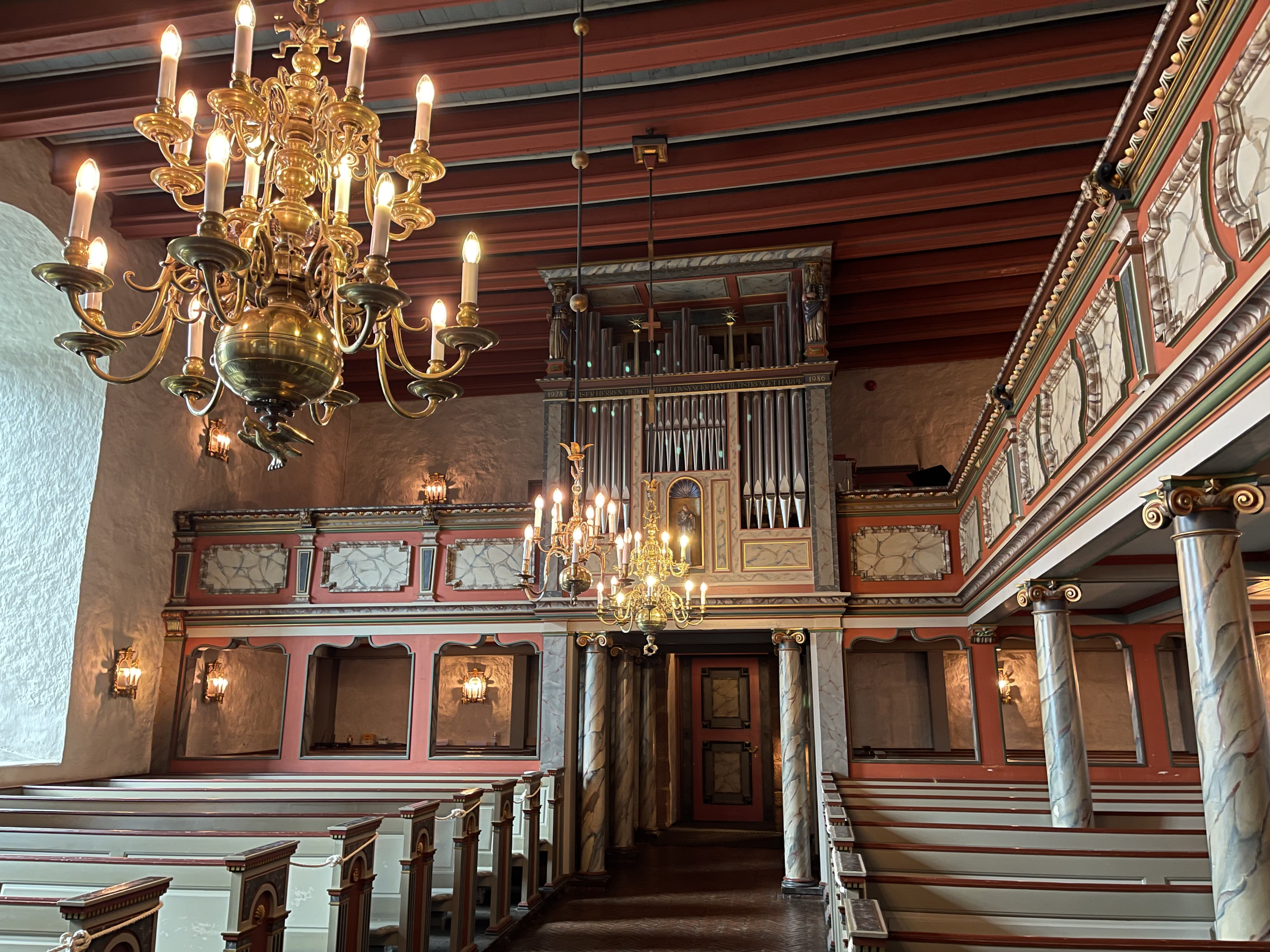

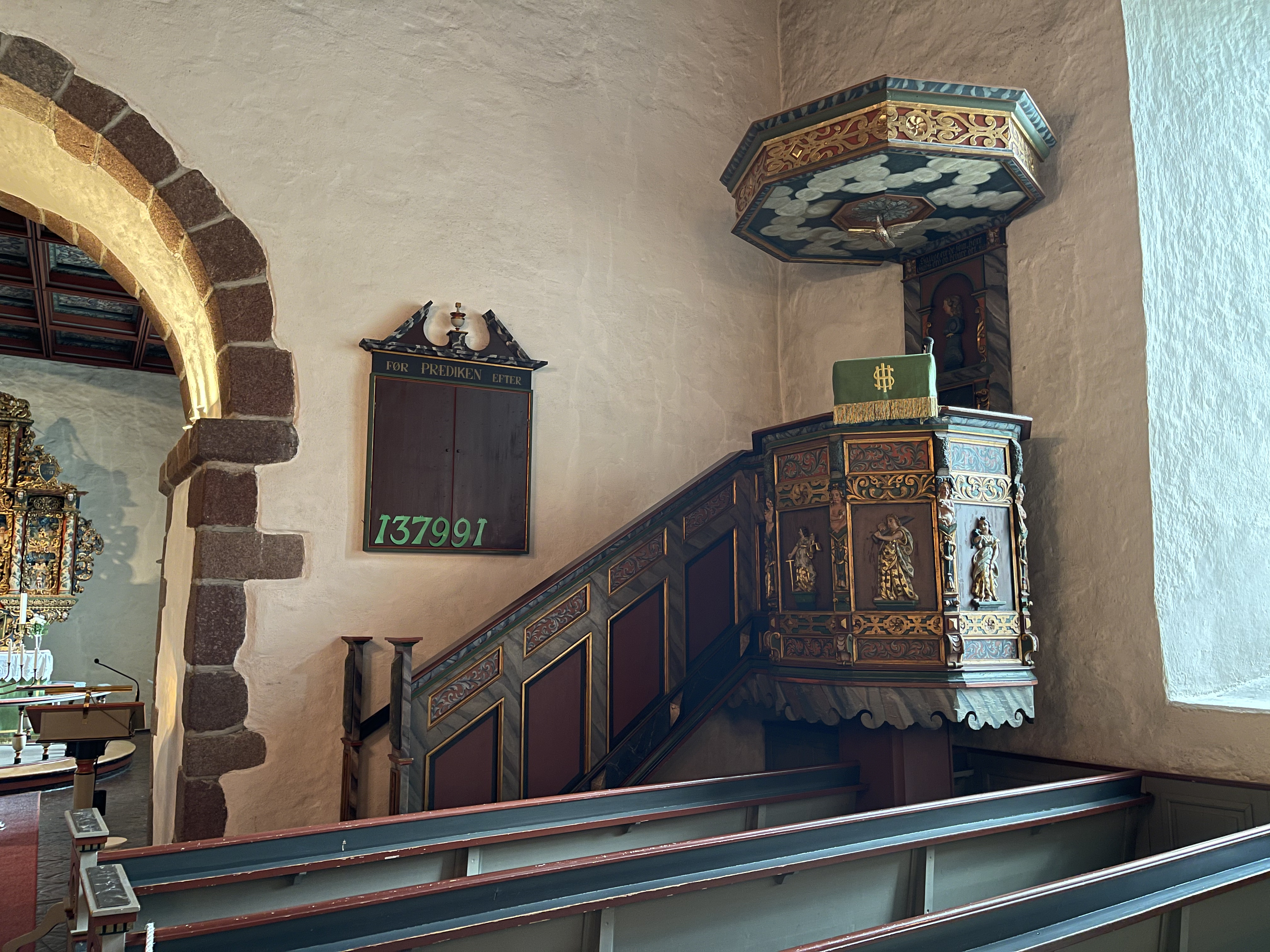

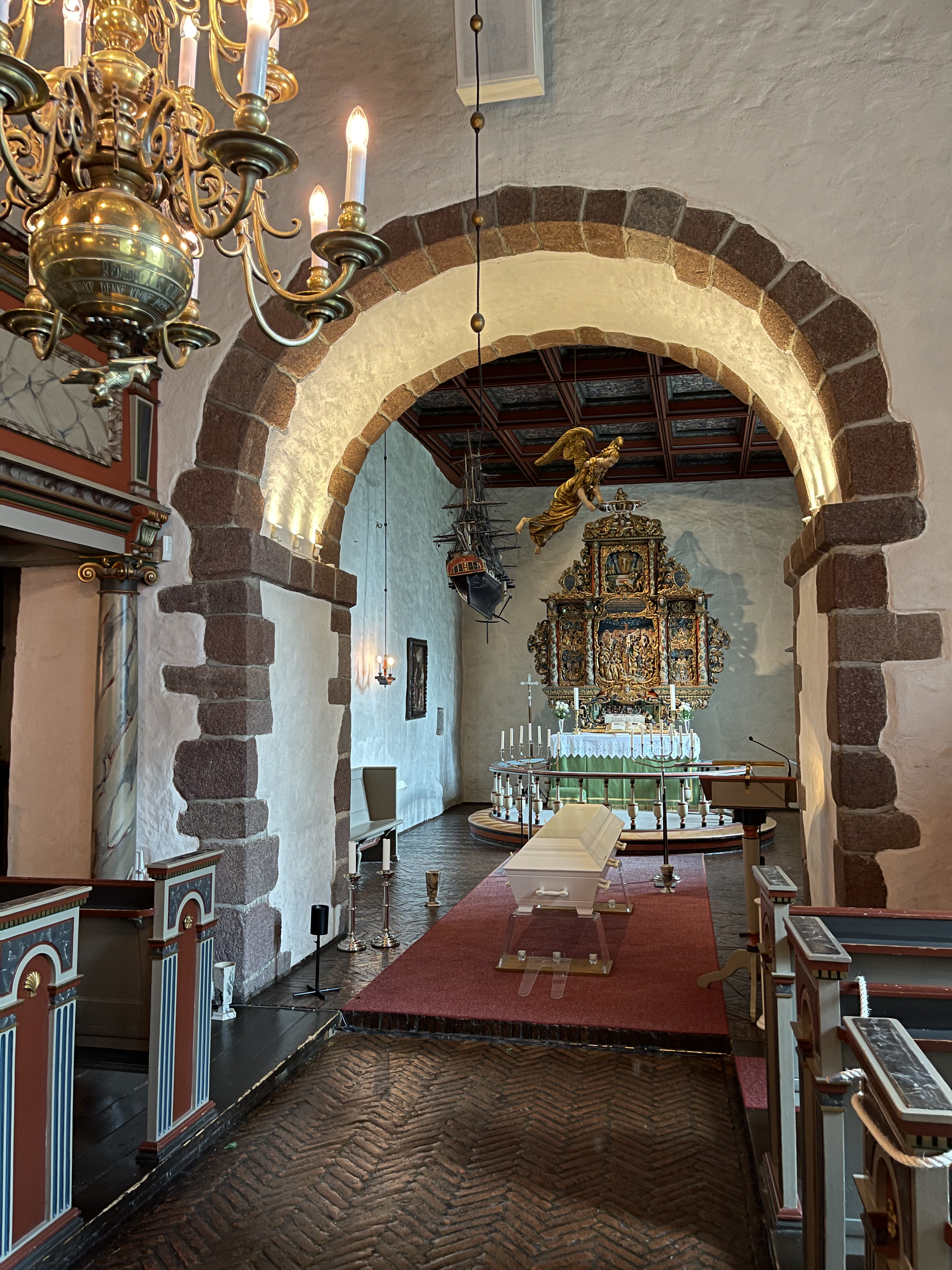

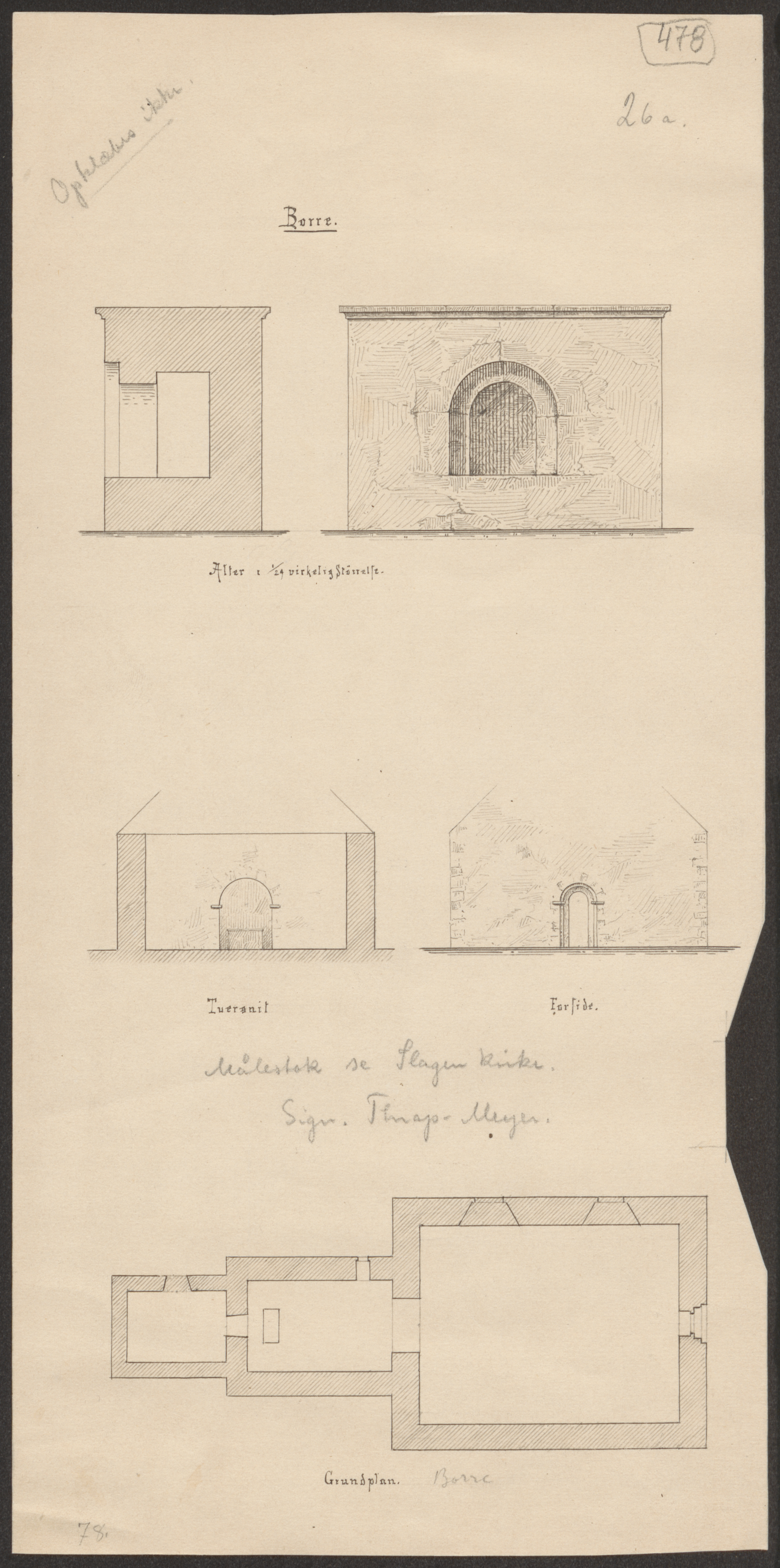

== See also ==
- List of churches in Tunsberg
