= 1929 in rail transport =

This article lists events related to rail transport that occurred in 1929.

== Events ==
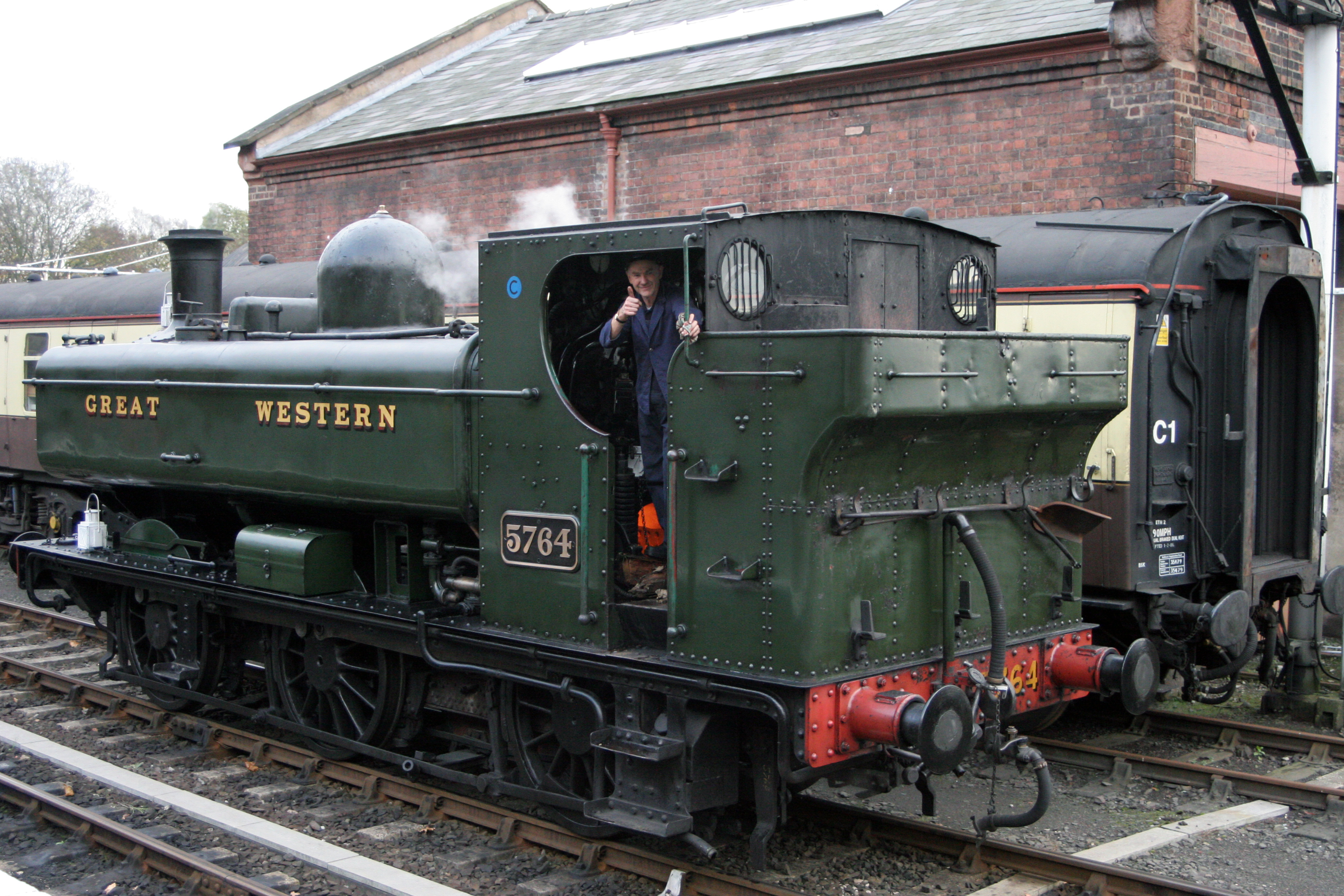
Early GWR 5700 Class locomotive

=== January events ===
- First of an eventual 863 Great Western Railway 5700 Class 0-6-0 pannier tank steam locomotives to Charles Collett's design completed at its Swindon Works, England.
- January 1 – Paul Shoup takes over the presidency of the Southern Pacific Company, parent company of Southern Pacific.
- January 12 – Great Northern Railway (United States) opens replacement Cascade Tunnel, at 7.8 mi (12.6 km) the longest through tunnel in North America.

=== March events ===
- March 1 – Sixty-nine railroads buy the American Railway Express Company and rename it Railway Express Agency.
- March 20 – Yaga Station in 5-chōme, Yaga, Higashi-ku, Hiroshima, Hiroshima Prefecture, Japan, opens.
- March 29 – Osaka Railroad Line, Osaka Abenobashi Station to Kashiharajingu-mae Station route, is officially completed in Japan and the Osaka Abenobashi to Yoshino Station (Nara) route direct commuter train service starts (as predecessor of the Kintetsu Minami Osaka Line).

=== April events ===
- April 1 – Odakyu Enoshima Line, Sagami-Ono to Katase-Enoshima of Fujisawa route is officially completed in Kanagawa Prefecture, Japan, and the Shinjuku Station (Tokyo) to Katase-Enoshima route direct commuter train service starts.
- April 10 – The Randsfjord Line and Sørland Line in Norway take electric traction into use between Drammen and Kongsberg.

=== May events ===
- May – Charles E. Denney succeeds John J. Bernet as president of the Erie Railroad.

=== June events ===
- June 29 – The last scheduled train runs on the Maine narrow gauge Kennebec Central Railroad.

=== July events ===
- July 7 – The Atchison, Topeka & Santa Fe Railway and the Pennsylvania Railroad begin air/rail service between New York and Los Angeles. Trip time is cut from 100 to 80 hours.

=== August events ===
- August 6 – The Ghan begins operation in Australia.
- August 26 – For the first time, Canadian National uses diesel locomotives to power a passenger train, with unit number 9000 on the second section of the International Limited between Montreal and Toronto.

=== October events ===
- October 1 – Tobu Nikko Line, Sugito via Tochigi to Tobu Nikko route is officially completed in Japan and the Tokyo Asakusa station to Tobu Nikko route direct express train service starts.

=== November events ===
- November 1 – The Southern Railway of England celebrates the 21st "birthday" of the Southern Belle passenger train with ceremonies at each end of the train's route between London and Brighton.

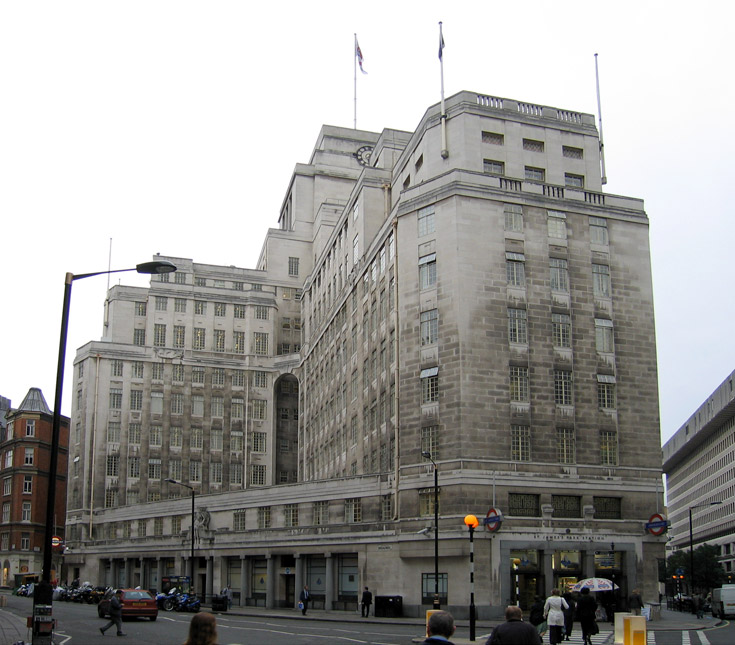
London Underground headquarters

=== December events ===
- The last Willamette locomotive is built for Neils Lumber Company of Klickitat, Washington.
- December 1 – Underground Electric Railways Company of London officially opens its notable new headquarters building at 55 Broadway, above St James's Park tube station, designed by Charles Holden.
- December 10 – Ottawa Electric Railway discontinues streetcar service between Carling Avenue and the Experimental Farm.
- December 11 – Nanbu Railway Line, predecessor of Nanbu Line, Tachikawa to Kawasaki route is officially completed in Japan.

=== Unknown date events ===
- Henry deForest assumes the position of Chairman of the Board of Directors of the Southern Pacific.
- ALCO purchases McIntosh and Seymour Diesel Engine Company for further manufacturing of diesel engines that will be installed in subsequent ALCO locomotives.
- Buenos Aires Great Southern Railway in Argentina takes delivery for suburban service of three diesel locomotives built by Armstrong Whitworth in conjunction with Sulzer Brothers, the first passenger diesels built in the UK.
- The Lake Superior & Ishpeming Railroad ends passenger train operations.
- London & North Eastern Railway adopts Eric Gill's Gill Sans typeface for its publicity material.

== Births ==
- March 9 – Roger Tallon, French industrial designer (died 2011).
- August 23 – Richard Steinheimer, American railroad photographer, is born (d. 2011).
- September – Ding Guangen, Minister of Railways for China 1985-1988 (died 2012).
