= Morris McDonald =

American railroad executive

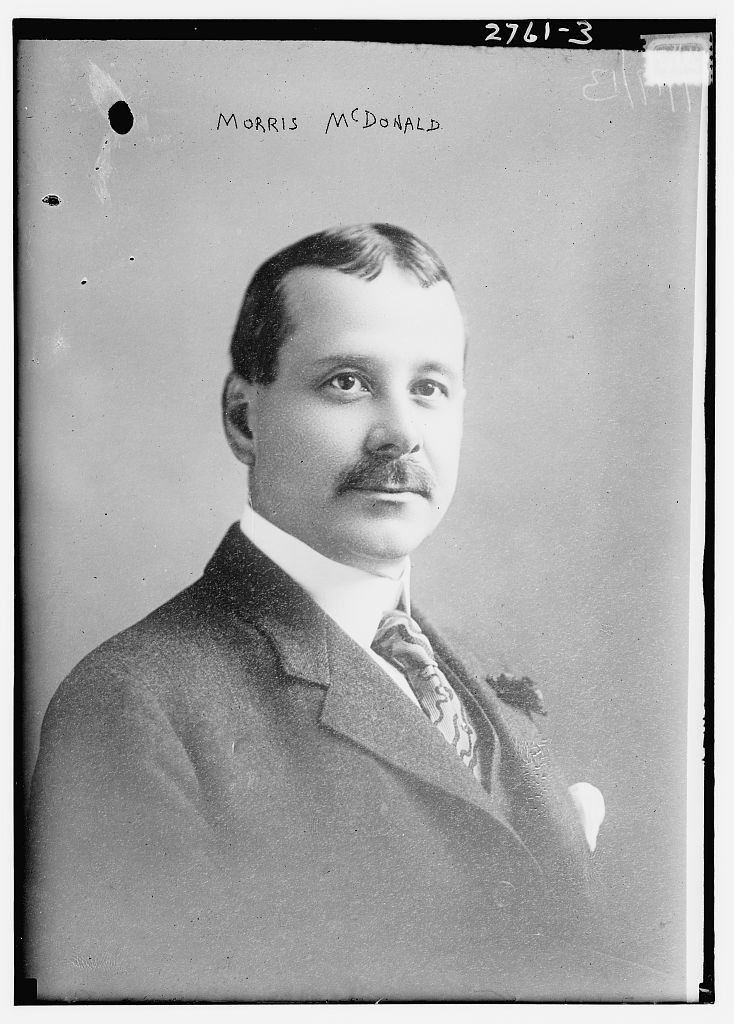
Morris McDonald

Morris McDonald (August 1865 – May 20, 1938), was an American railroad executive.

McDonald was born in New Albany, Indiana. He began his railroad career with the Louisville, Evansville and St. Louis Railway in 1885. He later worked for the Central of Georgia Railway and was appointed General Superintendent of the Maine Central Railroad in 1897.

He was president of the Boston & Maine Railroad from 1913 to 1914. He resigned that position, and then was president of the Maine Central until he retired in 1932.

McDonald died on May 20, 1938, in Portland, Maine.

== See also ==
- List of railroad executives
