= Charles Eugene Denney =

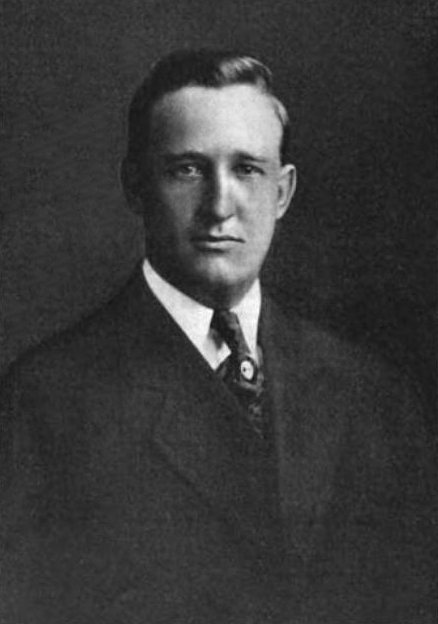
- Born: October 18, 1879; Washington, D.C., US
- Died: January 18, 1965 (aged 85); Pinehurst, North Carolina, US
- Education: Pennsylvania State College
- Occupations: Civil engineer, railroad president
- Employers: Lake Shore and Michigan Southern; Nickel Plate Road; Erie Railroad; Northern Pacific Railway
- Known for: Civil engineering, North American railroad signals, railroad official
- Spouse: Irene Sullivan Sickels
- Children: Charles Eugene Denney Jr.
- Parent(s): William H. Denney; Sarah E. Tabert

Charles Eugene Denney Sr. (October 18, 1879 – January 18, 1965) was president of Northern Pacific Railway from 1939 through 1950.

== Biography ==
He was born in Washington, D.C., on October 18, 1879, the son of William H. Denney and Sarah E. Tabert.

He married Irene Sullivan Sickels (c. 1880 – 1970), and together they had two sons: Clark Denney and Charles Eugene Denney Jr.

Denney was educated in the public schools of Lancaster, Pennsylvania, after which he attended Pennsylvania State College during 1899 to 1905, while working for Union Switch and Signal Company.

In 1905 he began working for the Lake Shore and Michigan Southern Railway (which later became part of New York Central Railroad) as assistant signal engineer. He worked his way up through promotions within the New York Central system until 1916 when he returned to Union Switch and Signal. In 1917 he moved to an executive position with the New York, Chicago and St. Louis Railroad where he was promoted to vice-president and general manager in 1928. In 1929 Denney became president of Erie Railroad. He remained in that position until October, 1939 when he became president of Northern Pacific Railway.

He died on January 18, 1965, in Pinehurst, North Carolina.

== See also ==
- List of railroad executives

Preceded by John Joseph Bernet	President of Erie Railroad; 1929 – 1939	Succeeded by Robert Eastman Woodruff
Preceded by Charles Donnelly	President of Northern Pacific Railway; 1939 – 1950	Succeeded by Robert Stetson Macfarlane
