= Robert Stetson Macfarlane =

Railway president (1899-1982)

Robert Stetson Macfarlane (January 15, 1899 – March 9, 1982) was president of Northern Pacific Railway 1951–1966.

He was born in Minneapolis, Minnesota, on January 15, 1899, the son of Walker K. and Blanche (Stetson) Macfarlane. He married Vivian Clemans on February 21, 1925; together they had Anne (Mrs. Raymond W. Jones Jr.), Mary (Mrs. Benjamin G. Griggs Jr.), Robert Jr., and Vivian (Sra. J. J. Martinez).

He served in the U.S. Navy from 1917 to 1919, leaving there as a lieutenant (junior grade).

Macfarlane was educated at Brown University and the University of Washington where he graduated magna cum laude with an L.L.B. degree in 1922. He worked at the law firm of Chadwick, McMicken, Ramsey, and Rupp from 1919 until his graduation in 1922, at which time he became chief deputy prosecuting attorney for King County, Washington, a position he held until 1925. The next five years were spent with the law firm of Schwellenbach, Merrick, and Macfarlane. In 1930 Macfarlane became a judge of the Superior Court for King County and remained in that position until 1934. He was named president of the University of Washington Alumni Association in 1931, and in 1933 he was honored with a distinguished service award from the U.S. Chamber of Commerce

After his service as a judge, Macfarlane became the assistant western counsel for Northern Pacific Railway, where he worked his way up through promotions to become president of the railroad in 1951. During this time, he also served as a Colonel for the U.S. Army Transportation Corps in 1951 and 1952. In 1966 he left the presidency to become chairman of the board for Northern Pacific. While he was working his way toward the railroad's presidency, Macfarlane also served as a director for the Seattle School Board from 1934 to 1950.

Macfarlane also served as a director for Chicago, Burlington and Quincy Railroad, Pacific National Bank in Seattle, First National Bank in St. Paul, Colorado and Southern Railway, St. Paul Fire and Marine Insurance, First Trust Company in St. Paul, American Smelting and Refining, Minnesota Mutual Life Insurance, and First Bank Stock Corporation in Minneapolis.

Preceded by Charles Eugene Denney	President of Northern Pacific Railway; 1951 – 1966	Succeeded by Louis W. Menk
