= John Joseph Bernet =

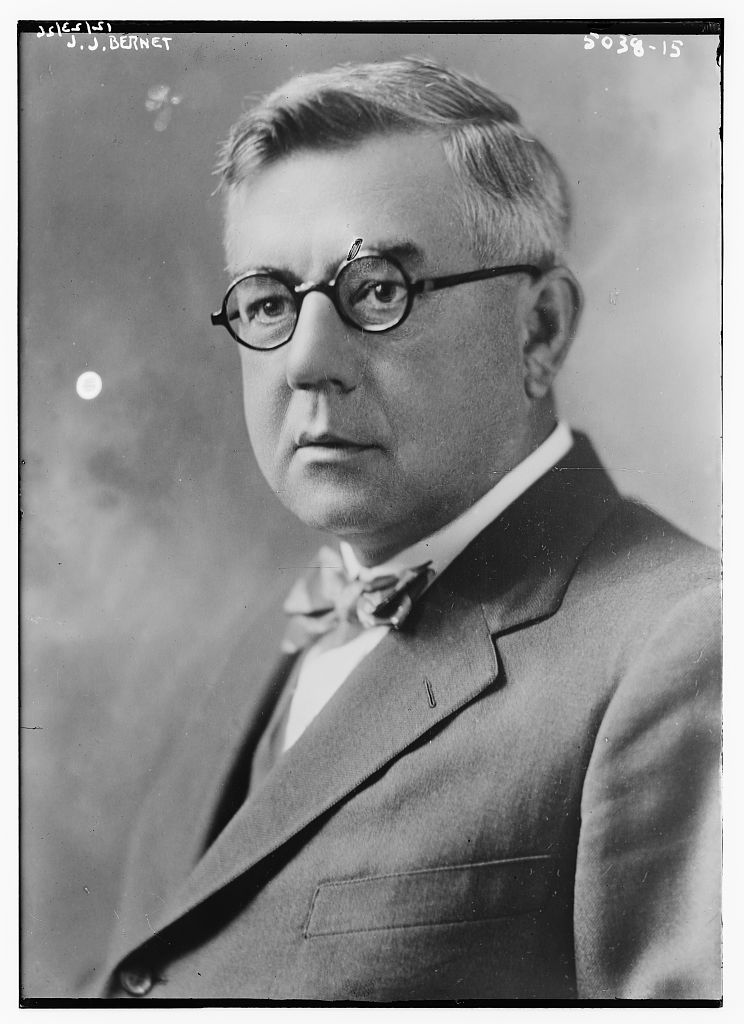
- Born: February 9, 1868; Brant, New York
- Died: July 5, 1935 (aged 67); Cleveland, Ohio

John Joseph Bernet (February 9, 1868 – July 5, 1935) was president of the Nickel Plate Road, Erie Railroad, Chesapeake and Ohio Railway and Pere Marquette Railroad in the United States. He was known for bringing railroad companies back from bankruptcy to solvency, earning him the nickname "Doctor of Sick Railroads".

== Youth and education ==
Bernet was born in Brant, New York, on February 9, 1868, to Bernard and Emma Greene Bernet. John's father, Bernard, had emigrated from Switzerland and had taken up the blacksmithing trade. After a public school education, John entered an apprenticeship at his father's blacksmith shop, but John was not able to perform the craft as well as his father had hoped.

== Railroad career ==
When the blacksmithing apprenticeship didn't work out, Bernet learned telegraphy and was hired in 1889 on the Lake Shore and Michigan Southern Railway. He worked his way up through various positions with the railroad to eventually become a Vice President for New York Central Railroad where he was in charge of the lines west of Buffalo.

Soon after the Van Sweringen Brothers purchased the Nickel Plate Road from the New York Central, Bernet was asked to lead the Nickel Plate in 1916. By the time he left the Nickel Plate, the railroad had grown considerably thanks to Bernet's work at upgrading the system. He is credited with doubling the railroad's total freight tonnage and average speeds systemwide while cutting fuel consumption in half. Bernet was succeeded at the Nickel Plate by Walter L. Ross at the end of 1926.

Bernet served as president of the Erie Railroad, another of the Van Sweringen's holdings, from January 1, 1927, through May 1929. His presidency of the Erie was characterized by a series of cost-cutting measures that included replacing much of the railroad's by then outdated rolling stock with new, more efficient equipment such as the Erie's Berkshire 2-8-4 steam locomotives, which were larger and more powerful than Lima's then current L-1 model Berkshires. Erie's Berkshires were of a design that included 70 in (1,800 mm) drivers, larger boilers and full-length locomotive frames; these locomotives helped change the Erie from a drag-freight railroad to a fast-freight railroad. After leaving the Erie Railroad, Bernet became president of Chesapeake and Ohio Railway.

The Van Sweringen brothers had gained control of the C&O and its then subsidiary Pere Marquette Railroad in the 1920s, so Bernet was already familiar to the rest of the management team there. Under Bernet's guidance, the C&O was one of the very few profitable railroad companies during the Great Depression, even going so far as earning and paying dividends in 1932. In 1933, he returned to the Nickel Plate Road's presidency. In that position he ordered the Nickel Plate's first 80 Berkshire locomotives. He served in that position until his death on July 5, 1935; he died at his home in Cleveland, Ohio. He was succeeded as president of the Pere Marquette, C&O by George D. Brooke; Bernet was succeeded at the Nickel Plate by W. J. Harahan who served until 1937 before himself being succeeded by Brooke.

He was greatly admired by his peers for his business acumen and after his death a privately printed biography, with an Appreciation by the Van Sweringens, was brought out.

== Legacy ==
Bernet very strongly encouraged John Carroll University to build a dormitory rather than a gymnasium and when the first dormitory on the university campus was completed in 1935, Bernet Hall was named in his honor. The residence hall still carries his name.

== Footnotes ==
Preceded by W. H. Canniff	President of Nickel Plate Road; 1916 – 1925	Succeeded by Walter L. Ross
Preceded by Frederick D. Underwood	President of Erie Railroad; 1927 – 1929	Succeeded by Charles E. Denney
Preceded by	President of Chesapeake and Ohio Railway; 1929 – 1932	Succeeded by George D. Brooke
Preceded by	President of Pere Marquette Railroad; 1929 – 1932	Succeeded by George D. Brooke
Preceded by	President of Nickel Plate Road; 1933 – 1935	Succeeded by W. J. Harahan
