= Louis W. Menk =

Louis Wilson Menk
- Born: April 8, 1918; Englewood, Colorado, US
- Died: November 27, 1999 (aged 81); Carefree, Arizona, US
- Occupation: Railway executive

Louis Wilson Menk (April 8, 1918 - November 23, 1999) was an American railway worker and executive. He served as the last president of Northern Pacific Railway 1966–1970, before the railroad was merged into Burlington Northern Railroad, and the first president and second chairman of Burlington Northern. Menk was also selected as Modern Railroads (now Railway Age) Man of the Year for 1967, an award that has continued annually and is now known as Railroader of the Year.

== Early life ==
Menk was the son of Louis Albert and Daisy Deane (Frantz) Menk. He married Martha Jane Swan on May 30, 1942. They had two children, David Louis and Barbara Ann.

Menk attended University of Denver, and Harvard Business School's six-week Advanced Management Program. He received honorary LL.D. degrees from Northwestern University (1959), Drury College (1965), University of Denver (1966), and Monmouth College.

== Career ==
- 1937 to 1940, telegrapher, Union Pacific Railroad
- 1940 to 1965, telegrapher, dispatcher, chief dispatcher, trainmaster, vice-president, president, St. Louis-San Francisco Railway
- 1965 to 1966, president and director, Chicago, Burlington and Quincy Railroad
- October, 1966 [to March, 1970], president and director, Northern Pacific Railway.
- 1970 to 1981, president(1970–71), CEO(1971–78), chairman(1971–1981), Burlington Northern
- 1982–1983, chairman, International Harvester (CEO May–November 1982)

== Publications ==
- Menk, Louis W. A Railroad Man Looks At America; Excerpts from the Speeches of Louis W. Menk. No place: privately published, n.d. [circa 1974].

Preceded by	President of St. Louis-San Francisco Railway; 1962 – 1966	Succeeded by Jack W. Gilliland
Preceded by Robert Stetson Macfarlane	President of Northern Pacific Railway; 1966 – 1970	Burlington Northern Railroad merger
Preceded by Stuart T. Saunders (PRR)	Modern Railways magazine Man of the Year; 1967	Succeeded by William B. Johnson (IC)
