= Robert Eastman Woodruff =

Robert Eastman Woodruff (September 11, 1884 – 1957) was president of the Erie Railroad from 1939 to 1949.

Preceded by Charles E. Denney	President of Erie Railroad; 1939 – 1949	Succeeded by Paul W. Johnston
