= Frederick Douglas Underwood =

- Born: February 1, 1849; Wauwatosa, Wisconsin
- Died: February 18, 1942 (aged 93); New York City
- Occupations: president of Erie Railroad; director of Wells Fargo & Company

Frederick Douglas Underwood (February 1, 1849 – February 18, 1942) was president of the Erie Railroad from 1901 to 1926 and a director of Wells Fargo & Company.

== Early life ==
Underwood was born in 1849 in Wauwatosa, Wisconsin, the son of Enoch Downs Underwood and Harriet Flint (Denny) Underwood. He attended the public schools of Wauwatosa and Wayland Academy, Beaver Dam, Wisconsin. In 1867 he entered the employ of the Chicago, Milwaukee & St. Paul Railroad, rising from clerk and brakeman to division superintendent.

In 1875, he married Sara Virginia Smith, by whom he had two sons, Enoch William and Russell Sage Underwood. They were divorced in 1886, and in 1893 he married Alice Stafford Robbins. (Note: Two Great Lakes ships eventually received the name Alice Stafford: a Lake Michigan passenger steamer of 859 gross tons, built at Benton Harbor, Michigan, in 1882 as the Lora and renamed Alice Stafford in 1897, and a tug of 141 gross tons, built in 1914 at Manitowoc, Wisconsin, for the Erie Railroad for service in the Chicago River.)

== Railroad career ==
In 1886 Underwood was named general superintendent of the Minneapolis and Pacific Railway. Before the end of the year he was superintendent of construction of its successor, the Minneapolis, St. Paul and Sault Ste. Marie Railway (Soo Line). Soon after promoted to general manager, he supervised the building of nearly 1,300 miles of line. There was a great rivalry between the Soo Line and James J. Hill's St. Paul, Minneapolis and Manitoba Railway, but Hill came to respect Underwood's ability, and the two leaders worked out a compromise.

When Hill had become a major shareholder in the Baltimore & Ohio Railroad, he secured the appointment of Underwood as vice president and general manager in 1899. However, with control of the B&O by the Pennsylvania Railroad in the offing, Underwood accepted J. Pierpont Morgan's offer of the presidency of the Erie Railroad in May 1901.

Underwood served as president of the Erie for 25 years. He was very involved in the day-to-day workings of the railroad and became known as "F.D." among the Erie's employees. During his tenure he made good use of limited financial resources to rebuild the long-troubled Erie as a first-class railroad, especially as a freight carrier. From 1920 to 1926 he was also chairman of the executive committee. A number of executives who served under him went on to fame in their own right, most notably Daniel Willard. Underwood retired from the Erie in 1926.

Elected a director of Wells Fargo & Company on January 2, 1902, Underwood served on the board until the company ceased express operations in 1918. He was appointed managing director of Wells Fargo in May 1910, but relinquished the post in November of that year.

The 340-foot, 3,045-ton package freighter Ramapo, built in 1896 at Buffalo, New York, was renamed F.D. Underwood by the Erie Railroad in 1910. Although sold to the Great Lakes Transit Corporation in 1916, the steamer continued to carry Underwood's name until she was sold for scrap in 1940.

== Later life ==
A licensed captain, Underwood owned three yachts in succession. He was also an early automobile owner. He owned two farms, one in Wauwatosa and another in Farmington, Minnesota; usually he spent his summers at the latter.

Underwood retired as president of the Erie Railroad on December 31, 1926. He died of pneumonia at his home at 151 Central Park West, New York City, at the age of 93 on February 18, 1942.
