= Philadelphia Club =

City club in the United States

Coordinates: 39.949°N 75.162°W

The Philadelphia Club
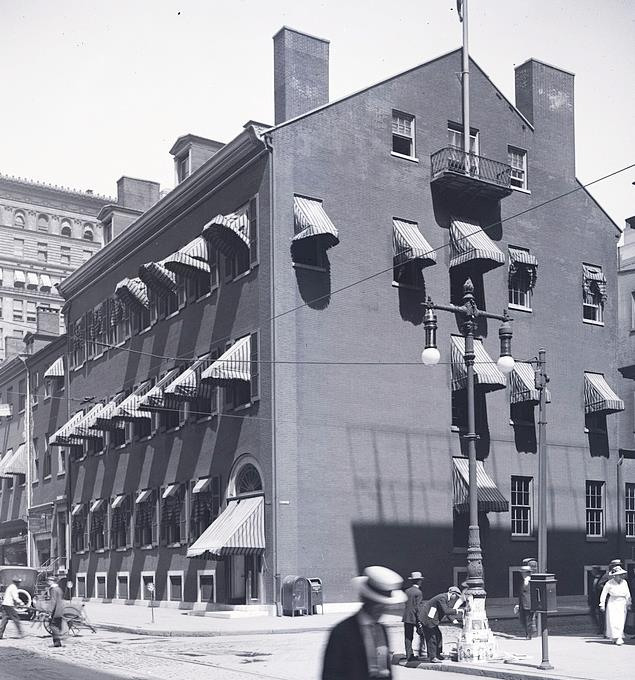
- Philadelphia Club in 1916
- Formation: 1834
- Type: Gentlemen's club
- Tax ID no.: 23-0969200
- Headquarters: Thomas Butler Mansion, 1301 Walnut Street, Philadelphia
- Location: Philadelphia, Pennsylvania, U.S.
- Region served: Philadelphia metropolitan area
- Members: 400

Designations

Philadelphia Register of Historic Places

The Philadelphia Club, founded in 1834, is the oldest city club in the United States. It is also one of the oldest gentlemen's clubs in America. Notable members have included General George Meade, General Theodore Roosevelt Jr., novelist Owen Wister, multiple presidents of the Pennsylvania Railroad, and numerous members of the Du Pont and Biddle families. The Club is located at the northwest corner of 13th and Walnut Streets in Center City Philadelphia.

== History ==
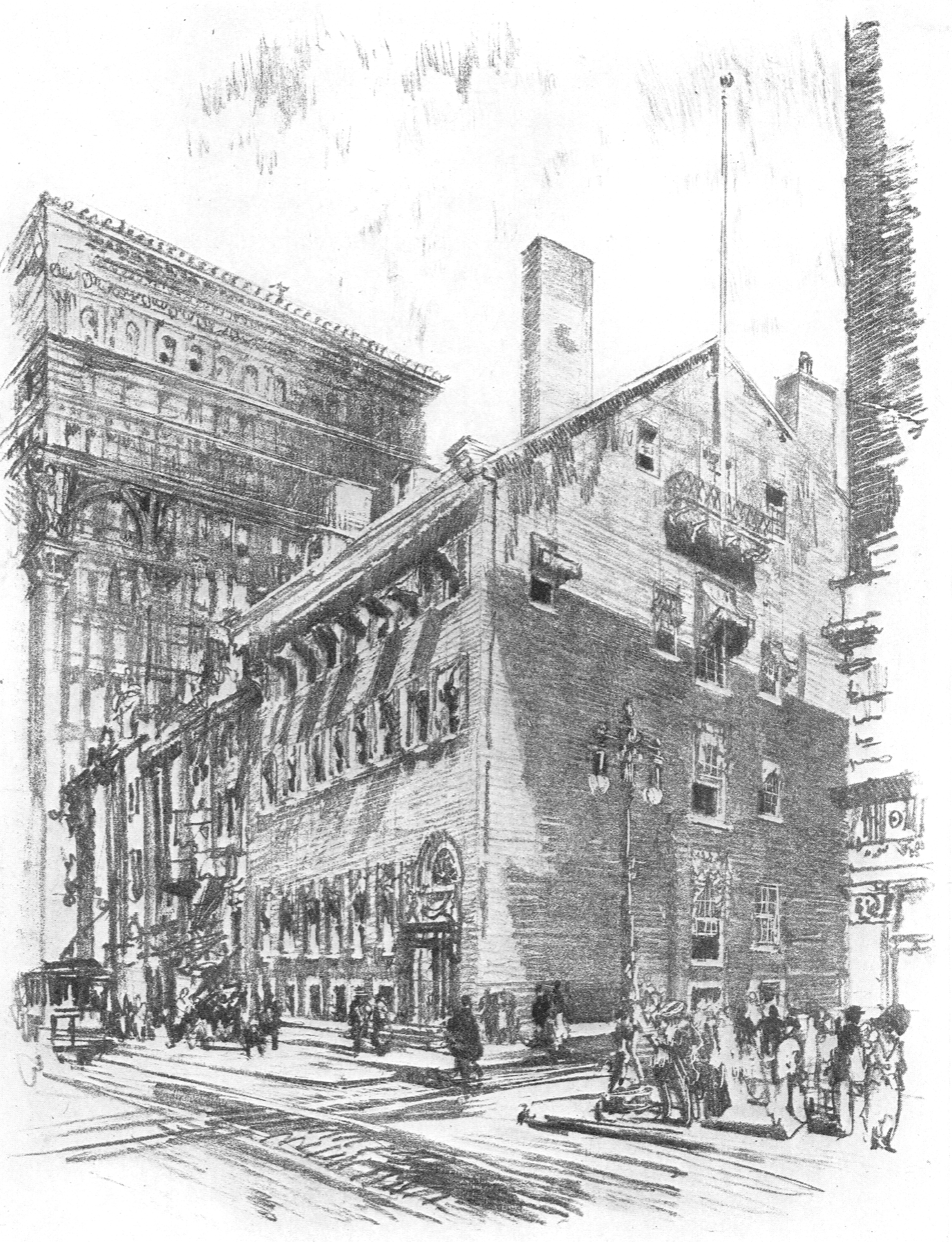
The Philadelphia Club, a 1912 illustration by Joseph Pennell

=== 19th century ===
In 1830, a group of men began meeting regularly to play cards at Mrs. Rubicam's Coffeehouse at the northwest corner of 5th & Minor Streets in Philadelphia. In early 1834, they rented space around the corner in the Adelphia Building at 212 South 5th Street, taking the building's name as the club's name. On March 21, 1834, the "Adelphia Club" held its first recorded meeting, adopting a Constitution and By-Laws. A week later, the club chose its first Board of Directors. In April 1835, the members rented the Joseph Bonaparte house at 260 South 9th Street, and changed the club's name to "The Philadelphia Club." In 1843, the club moved to rented space at 919 Walnut Street.

==== Club House ====
Thomas Bulter (Note: Thomas Butler (1778–1838) was the only surviving son and presumptive heir of Senator Pierce Butler of South Carolina, one of the richest men and largest slaveholders in the United States. Senator Butler spent his summers in Philadelphia, where he owned both a city house and a suburban villa. Thomas was disinherited by his father after he married a French woman against his father's wishes.) began to build the present Club House, in the most expensive manner, as a residence for himself, but died in 1838, leaving it unfinished; in his will he directed his trustees, Col. William Drayton and the Hon. John Sargeant, to finish it according to his plans. It then became the property of his son, Louis Bulter, who, however, never occupied it; the house was used for a time as a boarding house, and subsequently as a young ladies' boarding school.

Design of the Thomas Butler Mansion is attributed to architect William Strickland, and was one of his few residential commissions. The Philadelphia Club purchased the vacant mansion in 1849, and began alterations, including moving the kitchen to the basement and the addition of a billiards room. The new Club House at 1301 Walnut Street opened to Club members on November 18, 1850.

Architect Frank Furness expanded the Club House northward along 13th Street in 1888-89, with an addition that increased the size of its kitchens and the main dining room. Wilson Eyre renovated its interiors a decade later, and additional alterations were done by Horace Trumbauer in 1905 and 1908, and by Mellor, Meigs & Howe in 1916.

In addition to a library, card rooms, dining rooms, smoking rooms, and a bar, the Club House contains lodging rooms on its upper stories. It has a large collection of Philadelphia prints, and a collection of game trophy heads donated by Theodore Roosevelt Jr.

==== Staff ====
George C. Boldt, hired in 1876 as a dishwasher, rose to become the Club's steward and married the former steward's daughter. With financial backing from Club members, he built the Bellevue Hotel in Philadelphia. Bolt later built The Bellevue-Stratford Hotel, also in Philadelphia, and operated the Waldorf Astoria Hotel in New York City.

Jimmy Duffy, later a noted Philadelphia Main Line caterer, was the Club's bartender from 1895 to 1929.

=== 20th century ===
During Prohibition, the Philadelphia Police Department executed a raid on The Philadelphia Club. The purpose of the February 2, 1931 raid, led by Detective Bronislaw Wielbaba, was to seize illegal spirits and wine. According to Weilbaba's testimony, police confiscated 401 quarts, 118 pints, and a 1-gallon jug of alcohol from Club members' private lockers. The only arrest made was of the Club manager.

== Traditions ==
=== Men only ===
In its first 119 years, women were admitted to the Club on only three occasions: balls in January 1851 and January 1869, and the Club's centennial reception in October 1934. In May 1953, the membership voted to allow women guests at dinners. Many restrictions have since been eased, but women remain excluded from membership.

=== Washington's Birthday ===
During the Civil War, President Abraham Lincoln issued a proclamation that the birthday of George Washington should be celebrated nationally. On February 22, 1862, Philadelphia celebrated Washington's Birthday with a military parade led by Major General Robert Patterson. Philadelphia artist Joseph Boggs Beale recorded the Philadelphia Club's tribute in his diary:

The club house, 13th & Walnut, was illuminated with candles at every pane of glass, & had a beautiful American flag hanging so that the light on it showed it several squares away. In one of their windows they had a pure white marble head of Washington & the American flag (silk) covering the pedestal & this was set off with a dark red background and brilliantly lighted from above.

General George Meade was admitted to club membership soon after winning the 1863 Battle of Gettysburg.

=== Food ===
The Philadelphia Club features Veal and Ham Pie whose ancestor may be the "Travellers Pie," once a famous dish at London's Travellers Club that features bacon and pork as well as veal and ham. A luncheon favorite is Chicken Salad and Fried Oysters.

The current chef is French native Pierre Calmels who originally came to Philadelphia to be chef for several years at Georges Perrier's Le Bec-Fin and then, with his wife Charlotte, had his own restaurant called Bibou in south Philadelphia.

While many of the old classics are still on the menu at The Philadelphia Club, the culinary offerings are now world-class. Lunch is served daily Monday to Friday and dinner Thursday and Friday. There are also many specialty lunch and dinner events and private meals throughout the year.

== Club presidents and guests ==
The Club's presidents have included Captain James Biddle, George H. Boker, Adolph E. Borie, General George Cadwalader, Mayor Richard Vaux, and Owen Wister, who wrote the Club's 1934 centennial history.

Twelve U.S. presidents have been guests of the Club: John Quincy Adams, Martin Van Buren, James K. Polk, Franklin Pierce, James Buchanan, Ulysses S. Grant, Theodore Roosevelt, William Howard Taft, William McKinley, Franklin D. Roosevelt, Gerald R. Ford, and George H. W. Bush

Soldier and sailor guests: George B. McClellan, William Tecumseh Sherman, William F. "Buffalo Bill" Cody, George Dewey, George Goethals, and Jack Keane

Writer, artist, actor and musician guests: William Makepeace Thackeray, Henry Wadsworth Longfellow, Henry Irving, Charles Kemble, Edwin Booth, Booth Tarkington, John Barrymore, Joseph Pennell, Leopold Stokowski, Douglas Fairbanks Jr., Bram Stoker, Eugene Ormandy, Louis Kahn, and Roger Scruton

Other public men guests: Talleyrand, Stephen A. Douglas, Lord Randolph Churchill, Grand Duke Alexander, Oliver Wendell Holmes, Duarte Pio, Henry Cabot Lodge, Winston Churchill, Lord Louis Mountbatten, and Henry Clay

== Status as the oldest club ==
The Philadelphia Club is the oldest City Club in the United States. Three rural social clubs for men are older, but none of them offers the facilities of a traditional gentlemen's city club – regular hours, paid staff, a bar, a dining room, lodging rooms – that are associated with the English model of city clubs in the St. James's district of London.

The three older social clubs are:

- The South River Club in South River, Maryland, a fishing club that meets four times a year, was founded c. 1690 – 1700.
- The Schuylkill Fishing Company in Andalusia, Pennsylvania, which meets informally at the Philadelphia Club during winter months, was founded in 1732.
- The Old Colony Club in Plymouth, Massachusetts, which meets on Friday nights and special occasions, was founded in 1769.

== Notable members ==
- William Wallace Atterbury, President of the PA Railroad
- Edward Fitzgerald Beale
- Edward Julius Berwind
- Anthony Joseph Drexel Biddle
- Anthony Joseph Drexel Biddle Jr.
- Francis Beverly Biddle, U.S. Attorney General
- James Biddle
- Livingston L. Biddle Jr.
- Curtis Bok, PA Supreme Court justice
- George Henry Boker
- Adolph E. Borie, U.S. Secretary of the Navy
- George Cadwalader
- John Cadwalader Jr.
- Alexander J. Cassatt, President of the PA Railroad
- George William Childs
- William Thaddeus Coleman Jr.
- Fitz Eugene Dixon Jr.
- Anthony J. Drexel
- Franklin D'Olier
- Henry Francis du Pont
- Wilson Eyre, architect
- Edwin H. Fitler, Mayor of Philadelphia
- Thomas Sovereign Gates, President of the University of PA
- Thomas S. Gates Jr., U.S. Secretary of Defense
- Charles Gilpin, Mayor of Philadelphia
- Robert Goelet
- T. Truxtun Hare
- Howard Henry
- George Howe, architect
- John G. Johnson
- Gerry Lenfest
- William Draper Lewis
- James McCrea, President of the PA Railroad
- Robert L. McNeil Jr.
- George Meade
- Boies Penrose, U.S. Senator from PA
- Spencer Penrose
- Eli Kirk Price II
- Samuel Rea, President of the PA Railroad
- William T. Read
- George M. Robeson, U.S. Secretary of the Navy
- Theodore Roosevelt Jr.
- Joseph George Rosengarten
- Robert Montgomery Scott
- Thomas A. Scott, President of the PA Railroad
- Frank Thomson, President of the PA Railroad
- Charlemagne Tower Jr.
- Richard Vaux, U.S. Congressman & Mayor of Philadelphia
- Ethelbert Watts
- Piers Wedgwood, 4th Baron Wedgwood
- Francis Wharton
- George D. Widener Jr.
- Isaac J. Wistar, Civil War general
- Langhorne Wister
- Owen Wister, author & novelist
- Clarence C. Zantzinger, architect

== Critical assessment ==
In an April 2008 article from the gossip publication, Philadelphia Magazine described the club:

The Philadelphia Club, 1301 Walnut Street; 215-735-5924. The oldest and most guarded of the city's old-guard clubs sits, with increasing incongruity, at the edge of the Gayborhood – but the Philadelphia Club makes no adjustments to passing fads. Unmarked outside but for a discreet awning logo, it is said to be one of the oldest men's clubs in the U.S., feeding the city's elite since 1834. Inside the three-story building, the Philadelphia Club is – except on occasional nights when members gather around the piano to sing – kept deathly quiet by members eating Old Philadelphia lunches of chicken salad and fried oysters. The blue bloods hang out to play an archaic domino game called sniff. This is the hardest club in town to join, limited largely to old Philadelphia families. Walter Annenberg applied for membership once and was blackballed – though he was eventually accepted. Was he turned down because he was Jewish? Because he made enemies? Who knows. Founded: 1834. Number of members: 400. Notable facilities: Rooms for napping. Wait list: Unknown. Demographics: Pretty damn white, although it reportedly got into the token-Jew business in the 19th century. Notable members: Socialite Robert Montgomery Scott. Food: Members mention the ham and veal pie. Crustiness: As crusty as that ham-and-veal pie.

== Reciprocal relationships ==
- Union Club of the City of New York
- Somerset Club
- University Club of Chicago
- Maryland Club
- Wilmington Club
- Newport Reading Room
- Oglethorpe Club
- Boodle's in London
- Sallskapet in Stockholm
- Haagsche Club in The Hague
- Jockey Club für Österreich in Vienna
- The Travellers in Paris
- Domino Club in Bologna
- Vincent's Club in Oxford
- Circolo della Caccia in Rome
- Circolo dell'Unione in Florence

== See also ==
- List of traditional gentlemen's clubs in the United States
- Old Philadelphians
