= Walter S. Franklin (railroad executive) =

American railroad executive (1884–1972)

- Born: Walter Sidmons Franklin III; Ashland, Maryland, U.S.
- Died: August 17, 1972 (aged 88); Northeast Harbor, Maine, U.S.
- Education: Harvard University
- Occupation: Railroad executive
- Children: 2
- Awards: Distinguished Service Order; Legion of Honour; Distinguished Service Medal

Walter S. Franklin (died August 17, 1972) was an American railroad executive. He served as president of the Pennsylvania Railroad from 1949 to 1954.

== Early life ==
Walter Sidmonds Franklin III was born in Ashland, Maryland. He graduated from Harvard University in 1906.

== Career ==
In 1906, Franklin began work at Pennsylvania Railroad as a clerk. In 1933, he became vice president in charge of traffic. In 1937, he was elected to the board of directors. He later worked at freight offices in Baltimore, York, Toronto, Pittsburgh and Atlanta. He served as president of the Detroit, Toledo and Ironton Railroad from 1929 to 1931, president of Wabash Railroad and Ann Arbor Railroad from 1931 to 1933. He was president of Long Island Rail Road from 1950 to 1955.

Franklin served in the U.S. Army during the Mexican board troubles. During World War I, Franklin directed the movement of troops and supplies through England. He received the Distinguished Service Order, Legion of Honour and the Distinguished Service Medal for his service during World War I. He helped establish the Port of Philadelphia and a multi-million dollar pier at Greenwich Point in Philadelphia.

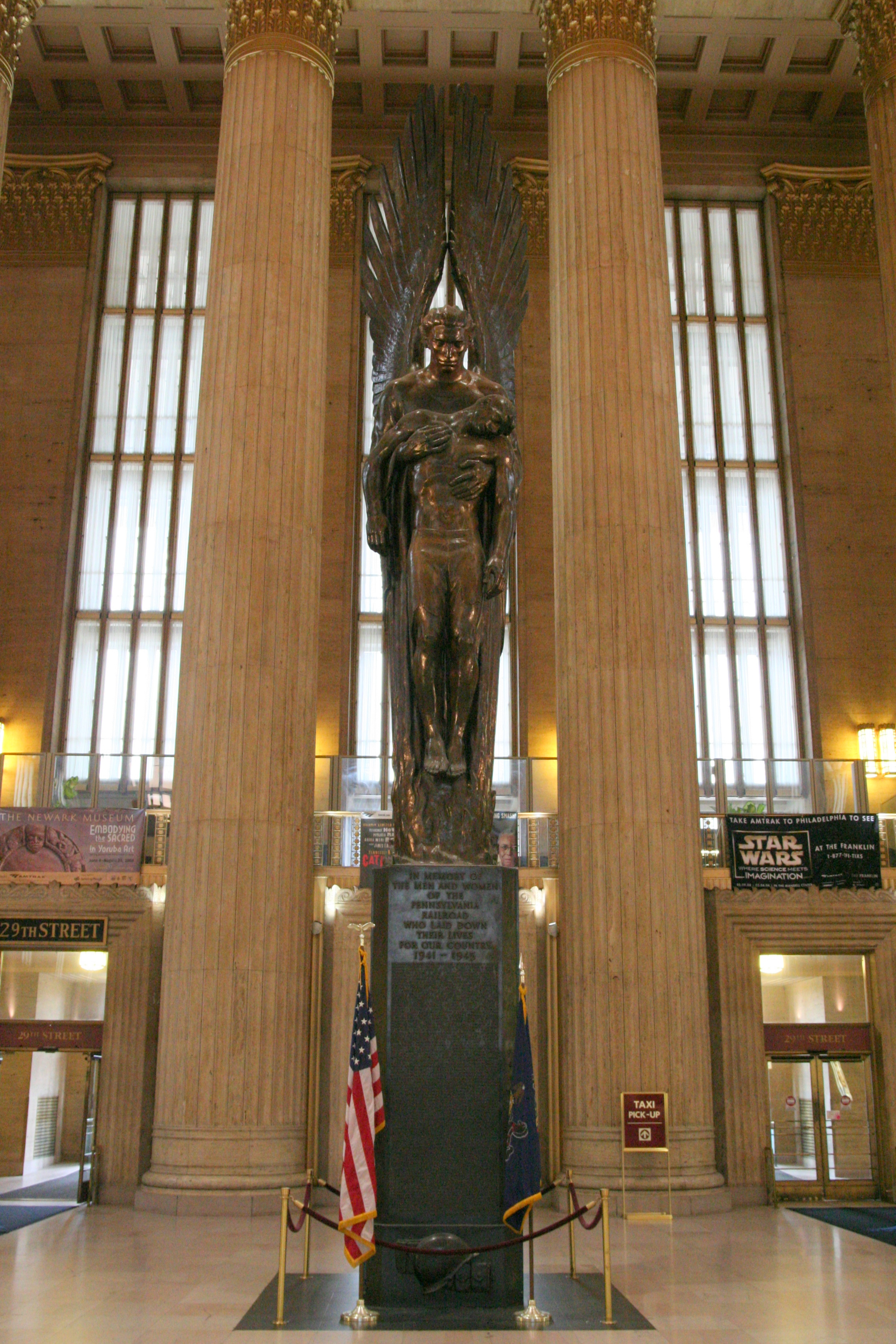
Pennsylvania Railroad World War II Memorial in Philadelphia was commissioned during Franklin's PRR presidency.

In 1938, Franklin returned to Pennsylvania and became director. During World War II, he was advisor to the Secretary of Navy. He was appointed executive vice president of Pennsylvania Railroad in 1947. He served as president of the Pennsylvania Railroad from June 16, 1949, to May 31, 1954. He continued as a director until 1959. He was president of the American Trading Company of New York City, an import-export firm, for ten years.

== Personal life ==
Franklin had a daughter and son, Mrs. Casper W. Morris and William B. He lived at 45 West Old Gulph Road in Ardmore, Pennsylvania.

Franklin died on August 17, 1972, aged 88, in Northeast Harbor, Maine.

== Legacy and awards ==
Franklin received an honorary degree from the University of Pennsylvania.

== See also ==
- List of railroad executives

| Preceded by Martin W. Clement | President of the Pennsylvania Railroad; 1948 – 1954 | Succeeded by James M. Symes |
