= USS Appanoose =

Cargo ship of the United States Navy

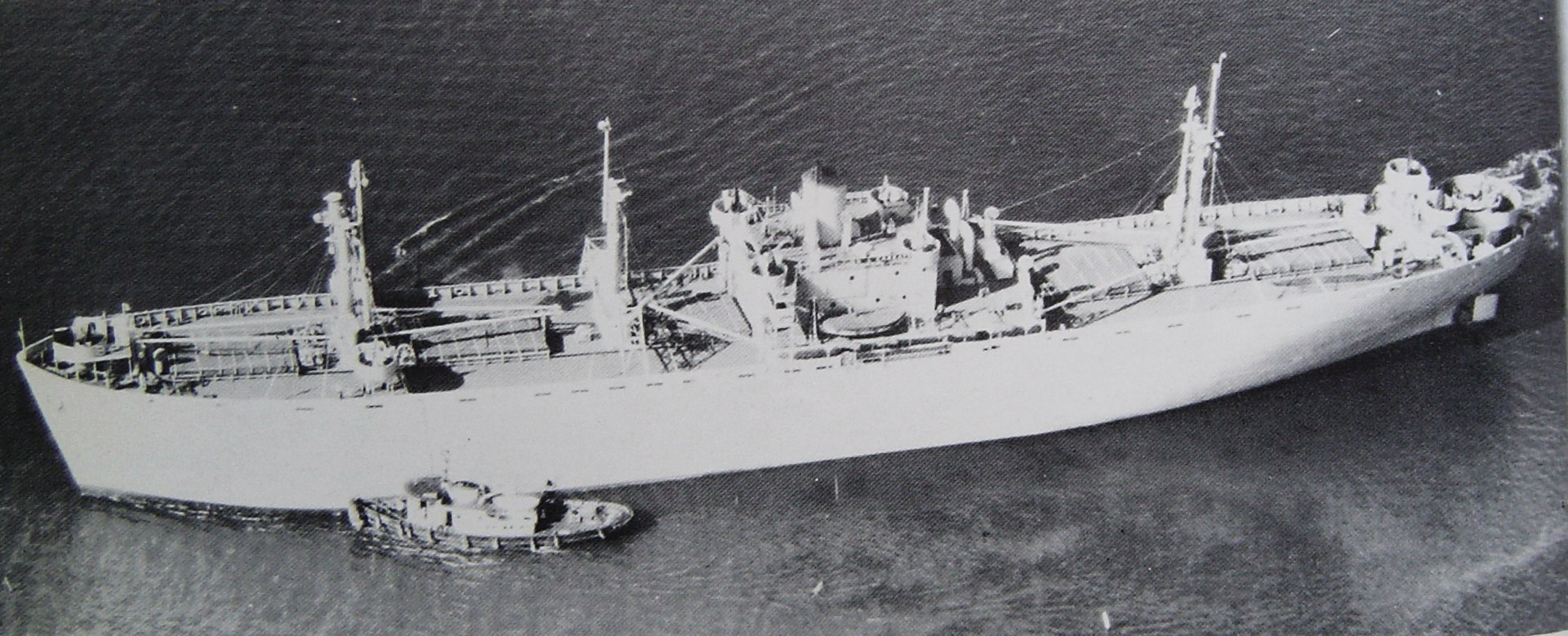
- SS A. J. Cassatt on delivery from Bethlehem-Fairfield in August 1944.

History

United States
- Name: A.J. Cassatt; Appanoose
- Namesake: A.J. Cassatt; Appanoose County, Iowa
- Ordered: as a type (EC2-S-C1 hull), MCE hull 2662, SS A.J. Cassatt
- Builder: Bethlehem-Fairfield Shipyard, Inc., Baltimore, Maryland
- Laid down: 20 June 1944
- Launched: 27 July 1944
- Sponsored by: Mrs. A. J. Cassatt
- Acquired: 10 August 1944
- Commissioned: 26 September 1944
- Decommissioned: 26 November 1945
- Stricken: 5 December 1945
- Identification: Hull symbol:AK-226
- Fate: Sold 1947 for civilian service; Scrapped after 23 December 1964

General characteristics
- Class & type: Crater-class cargo ship
- Displacement: 4,023 long tons (4,088 t) (standard); 14,550 long tons (14,780 t) (full load)
- Length: 441 ft 6 in (134.57 m)
- Beam: 56 ft 11 in (17.35 m)
- Draft: 28 ft 4 in (8.64 m)
- Installed power: 2 × Babcock & Wilcox header-type boilers, 220psi 450°; 2,500 shp (1,900 kW)
- Propulsion: 1 × General Machine Corp. vertical triple-expansion reciprocating steam engine; 1 × shaft
- Speed: 12.5 kn (23.2 km/h; 14.4 mph)
- Complement: 209 officers and enlisted
- Armament: 1 × 5 in (127 mm)/38 caliber dual-purpose (DP) gun; 1 × 3 in (76 mm)/50 caliber DP gun; 2 × 40 mm (1.57 in) Bofors anti-aircraft (AA) gun mounts; 6 × 20 mm (0.79 in) Oerlikon cannon AA gun mounts

USS Appanoose (AK-226) was a Crater-class cargo ship in the United States Navy named for Appanoose County, Iowa.

A. J. Cassatt was laid down on 20 June 1944 under a Maritime Commission contract (MCE hull 2662) by the Bethlehem Fairfield Shipyard Inc., Baltimore, Maryland; launched on 27 July 1944; sponsored by Mrs. A. J. Cassatt. She was acquired by the Navy on 10 August 1944, renamed Appanoose (AK-226) and commissioned on 26 September 1944.

On 1 October, Appanoose proceeded to the Chesapeake Bay for shakedown. After loading cargo at Davisville, Rhode Island, the ship got underway for the Philippine Islands. Appanoose transited the Panama Canal; made intermediate stops at Eniwetok and Ulithi; and anchored at Tacloban, Leyte Island, on 21 December. Three days later, the ship moved to Samar to begin assembling pontoons. Despite enemy torpedo attacks, she successfully completed the task and withdrew to Tacloban on 21 January 1945.

Appanoose sailed on 23 January, bound for the west coast. After a brief stop at Manus, the ship continued on to the California coast and arrived at San Pedro, Los Angeles on 23 February. Appanoose departed the west coast on 9 March and sailed for the Ryukyus.

After stops at Eniwetok and Ulithi, Appanoose reached Okinawa on 28 April and began discharging her cargo at Buckner Bay on 3 May. During the three months Appanoose was stationed at Okinawa, she endured numerous Japanese air attacks. The ship claimed to have downed one Japanese plane and assisted in downing four more.

On 5 August, Appanoose departed the Okinawa area and sailed in a convoy to Saipan, her first port of call on a voyage that took her by way of Pearl Harbor, to San Francisco, California. Appanoose made San Francisco on 5 September and, shortly thereafter, began a period of drydocking and availability.

Upon completion of the repair work on 8 October, Appanoose headed for the Panama Canal Zone. Having transited the Panama Canal, the ship reported to the Norfolk Naval Shipyard, Portsmouth, Virginia, on 30 October.

Appanoose was decommissioned there on 26 November 1945 and turned over to the War Shipping Administration. Her name was struck from the Navy list on 5 December 1945.

Appanoose earned one battle star for her World War II service

== Civilian service ==
- sold to Fordom Trading Co, N.Y., November 1947, for Cia de Operaciones Maritimas SA, Panama RP - renamed SS Santa Ana - reflagged Panamanian
- sold to Cia Nav San Maritime SA, Panama RP in 1951, - name retained - Panamanian flagged
- sold to San Martin Cia de Nav SA, 1952, - name retained - Panamanian flagged
- 1958 managed by Cargo & Tankship Management Corp, N.Y.
- 1961 managed by Santa Maria Shipowning & Trading Co (Bermuda) Ltd - name retained
- arrived Yokohama, 4 November 1964, in tow after losing propeller while bound from Osaka to Portland, OR.
