= Ashland Home =

Historic house in Maryland, US

- U.S. National Register of Historic Places
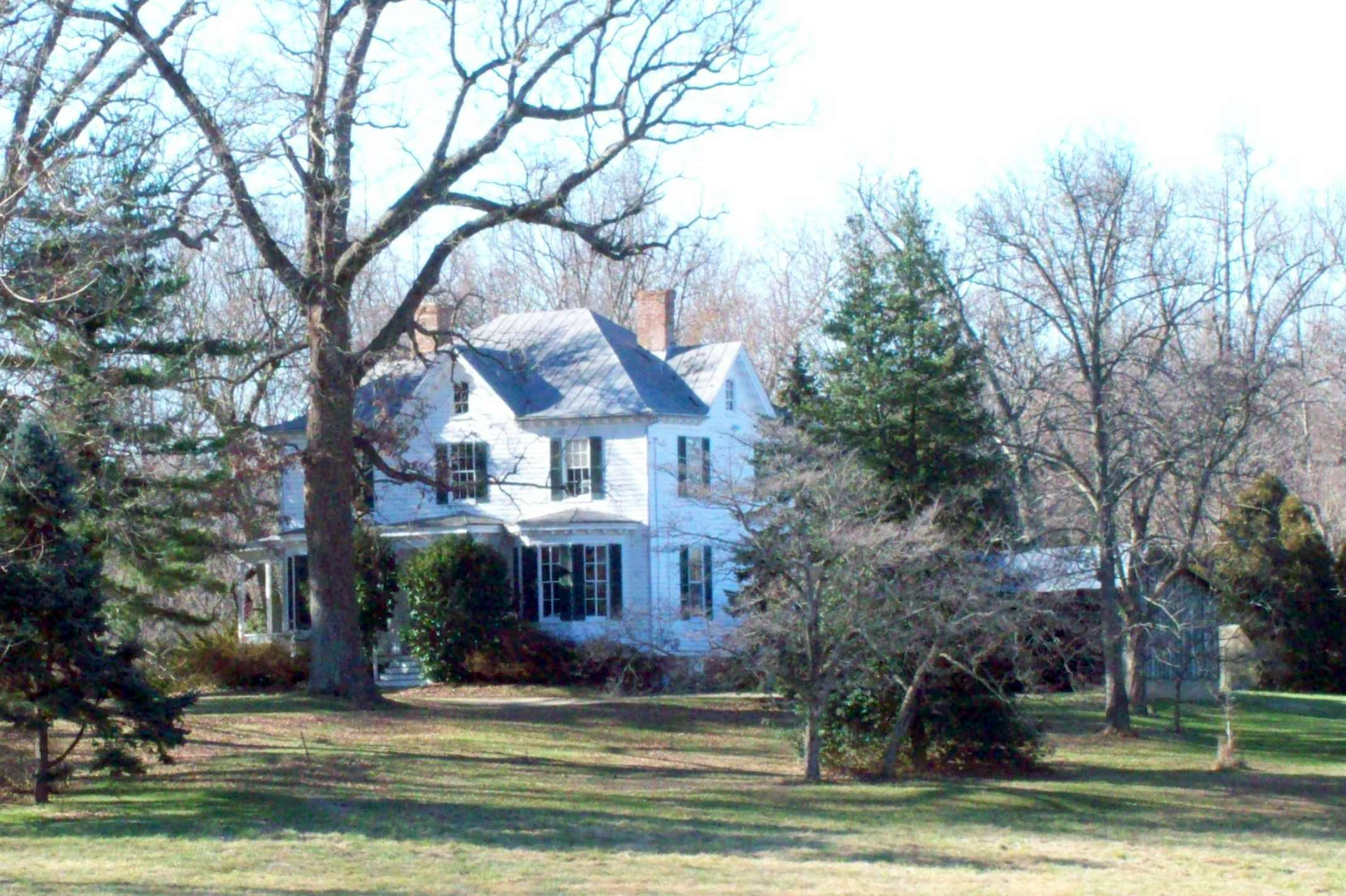
- The Ashland Home in December 2008

- Location within Maryland Location within the United States
- Location: 16109 Marlboro Pike, Upper Marlboro, Maryland, U.S.
- Coordinates: 38°49′1″N 76°43′44″W
- Area: 53 acres (21 ha)
- Built: 1866
- Built by: Peake, William H., Jr.; Hunt, John H.
- Architectural style: Italianate
- NRHP reference No.: 94001155
- Added to NRHP: September 15, 1994

The Ashland Home is a historic home located in Upper Marlboro, Prince George's County, Maryland, United States. It is a 2 1/2-story, hip-roofed frame dwelling with fine Victorian Italianate decorative detail.

The home was built in 1866–1867 by William Beanes Hill of Compton Bassett for his son, William Murdock Hill. The house has been continuously associated with the prominent Hill family. The home is one of only a few significant frame dwellings of the Italianate style which survive in the county. It has a simple square floor plan, with cross gables in each plane of the hip roof. Also on the property are historic outbuildings.

Ashland was listed on the National Register of Historic Places in 1994.
