= Martin W. Clement =

American railroad executive

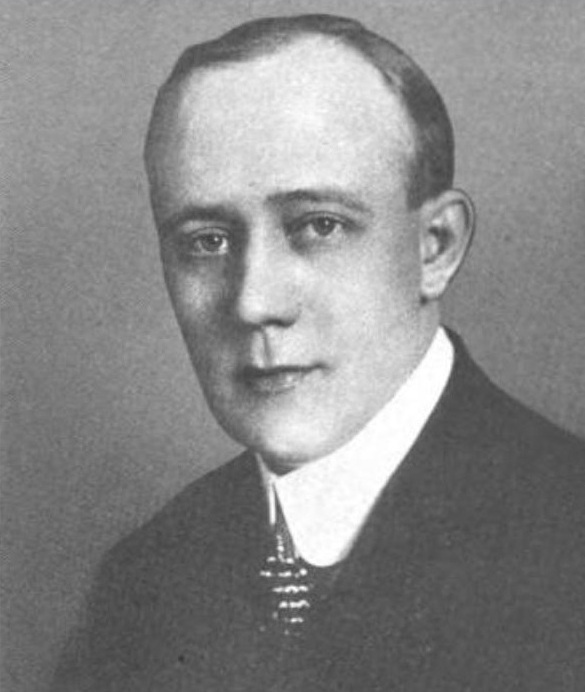
- Clement in 1917
- Born: Martin Withington Clement; December 5, 1881; Sunbury, Pennsylvania, U.S.
- Died: August 30, 1966 (aged 84); Rosemont, Pennsylvania, U.S.
- Education: Trinity College
- Occupation: Railroad executive
- Employer: Pennsylvania Railroad

Martin Withington Clement (December 5, 1881 – August 30, 1966) was the 11th president of the Pennsylvania Railroad (PRR), from 1935 to 1948.

== Background ==
Clement was born and raised in Sunbury, Pennsylvania. He was the son of Major General Charles M. Clement. He attended Trinity College in Hartford, Connecticut, graduating in the Class of 1901 with a degree in civil engineering. While there, he was a member of the Fraternity of Delta Psi.

Martin W. Clement was a veteran of the Pennsylvania National Guard’s 12th Regiment.

== Career ==
Clement joined the Pennsylvania Railroad as a rodman for the principal assistant engineer of a Pennsylvania Railroad subsidiary. Rising through the railroad's engineering ranks, he assisted in surveying the floor of the Hudson River during construction of Pennsylvania Station in New York City in the 1900s.

During World War I, he was superintendent of transportation to the U.S. Railroad Administration. After World War I, Clement was tapped to become head of the Pennsylvania Railroad's Lake Division in Cleveland, and steadily rose through the corporate ranks to executive vice-presidency.

Clement was formally nominated to the Pennsylvania Railroad's presidency in April 1935. His retiring predecessor was William Wallace Atterbury, in whose capacity Clement had acted since July 1934. Under Clement, operating revenues grew from $368 million in 1935 to a peak of over $1 billion in 1944. One of his great accomplishments was the continuation of electrification of the PRR mainlines, begun under General Atterbury, from New York City to Philadelphia, Baltimore, Washington, DC, and Harrisburg, Pennsylvania. He also oversaw the introduction of more streamlined locomotives, new and old passenger cars that were air-conditioned, and the beginning of dieselization. By the end of World War II, PRR controlled more than 20 percent of American passenger traffic and 11 percent of freight traffic.

On March 16, 1936, he was on the cover of Time magazine.

During World War II he was an advisor to the War Department about railroads.

Succeeded by Walter S. Franklin in the railroad's presidency, Clement continued to serve as Chairman of the Board until 1951, and as a Pennsylvania Railroad director until 1957.

== Personal ==
Clement retired to his home in Rosemont, Pennsylvania, where he died on August 30, 1966. Two days later, all Pennsylvania Railroad trains systemwide came to a stop for one minute at 3:00 PM Eastern Time in his honor. Clement was buried at Church of the Redeemer Cemetery in Bryn Mawr.

Annually, the Trinity Chapter of St. Anthony Hall (the Fraternity of Delta Psi), host the Martin Withington Clement Lecture in his honor.

== See also ==
- List of railroad executives

Preceded by William Wallace Atterbury	President of the Pennsylvania Railroad; 1935–1948	Succeeded by Walter S. Franklin
