= James M. Symes =

James Miller Symes (/sɪmz/ simz; July 8, 1897 – August 3, 1976), was the 13th president of the Pennsylvania Railroad.

== Family ==
Symes was born in Glen Osborne, Pennsylvania. He was the son of Frank H. and Clara (Heckert) Symes and graduated from high school in Sewickley, Pennsylvania. His later rise to prominence with the Pennsylvania earned him honorary college degrees from Waynesburg, Duquesne, Ursinus, Trinity, Marietta and Ohio. On September 27, 1919, he married Fern Elizabeth Dick; they had one daughter, Jeanne Doris.

== On the Standard Railroad of the World ==
Symes joined the Pennsylvania Railroad as a clerk in 1916. One of the earliest—and largest railroads in the United States—the Pennsylvania began styling itself the "Standard Railroad of the World" the same year James Symes went to work for the company. One of the largest railroads, it was also one of the largest business concerns in the U.S. It bought and carried miles of steel rails, bought and carried millions of tons of anthracite coal, carried more tonnage and earned more income than almost any other road in the nation. Symes was rapidly promoted through the World War One era and the era of nationalization under the U.S. Railroad Administration from car tracer, car distributor and statistician, moving from Pennsylvania to the general superintendent's office in Cleveland, Ohio.

In 1923, he was appointed freight movement director for the Pennsy's Central Region, with headquarters in Pittsburgh, Pennsylvania. He then apprenticed to the road's general manager in Chicago, Illinois, from 1927 to 1928. Following this posting, he was appointed superintendent for passenger transportation on the western half of the Pennsy system, again headquartered in Chicago. In 1934 he went to the road's headquarters in Philadelphia, Pennsylvania, as chief of freight transportation.

In 1935, he was lent out to the Association of American Railroads for a four-year period, serving as vice-president, operations and maintenance, for the industrial association of American's largest systems. He worked out of the AAR's headquarters in Washington, D.C. He returned to the Pennsy in 1939 as general manager for the Western Region at Chicago. In the 1940s and early 1950s, Symes was promoted into the top operational positions on the Pennsylvania. These were vice-president at Chicago (1942–46), deputy vice-president for operations at Philadelphia (1946–47), vice president, operations (1947–52), executive vice-president (1952–54), and in June, 1954, president.

== Death of the Pennsy and the birth of Penn Central ==
On November 1, 1959, Symes was named chairman of the board of directors with Allen J. Greenough, former vice-president in charge of transportation and maintenance, succeeding Symes as president. Behind the scenes, Ball noted, "The one-time unimagineable, unthinkable scenario of Pennsy and New York Central discussing survival by merging the two properties had begun." Retired Penn Central executive Peter E. Lynch noted in his history of the Penn Central that "A severe economic recession in 1957-8 caused both the Pennsy and the New York Central to lose seventeen percent of their revenue. Symes believed Pennsy and Central to be complementary and approached the Central's Robert R. Young in late 1957 about consolidation . . . . the two roads continued to talk after Young's death until early in 1959, when talks broke off because of Central's Alfred E. Perlman's belief that merger with the Baltimore and Ohio would better balance the Pennsylvania and its Norfolk and Western-Nickel Plate Road-Wabash Railroad affiliate." This planning fell apart in 1960 when the Baltimore and Ohio instead decided on consolidation with the Chesapeake and Ohio Railway and the Western Maryland Railway, forerunners of CSX Transportation.

Symes was not deterred, stating to the Interstate Commerce Commission during its Chessie system hearings in 1960 "that he did not oppose the Baltimore and Ohio/Chesapeake and Ohio merger and remained open to merging with the Central." In fact, Joseph Daughen and Peter Binzen write that Symes was a surprise witness at the hearings, asked by the Chessie's management to show up and support their merger. Symes went out of his way to say that if the New York Central knocked on the Pennsy's door, "that door would not be closed".

Financial pressures brought Perlman on October 25, 1961 to Symes and they agreed to take up where they had left off twenty-one months before. Agreement on key issues was quickly reached. The Central would sell its twenty percent interest in the Baltimore and Ohio. The Pennsy would divest itself, over time, of its one-third interest in the Norfolk and Western. (Penn Central's financial officer, David C. Bevan, would use the $300 million realized from this sale on non-rail diversification.) The Central would thus go out of business as a corporate entity, while the corporate existence of the Pennsylvania would continue under a new name. By 1962 the Pennsy and Central boards approved a Penn Central merger where one share of Pennsy stock would be exchanged for one share of the new company's stock, and 1.3 shares of Central stock would be exchanged for one share of the new Penn Central stock. Board representation would be based on shares outstanding in 1961—about 6.5 million for the Central, about 13.2 for the Pennsy—the outstanding shares, resulted in a sixty-forty split on the new board in favor of the Pennsy shareholders. By the end of the year the roads applied to the Interstate Commerce Commission for permission to merge.

ICC hearings and adverse reaction from the Department of Justice meant permission to merge would not be granted for an additional two years. Symes, first to testify before the ICC, touted the size of the system resulting from the merger—largest in terms of miles of track—largest in terms of gross revenue. Penn Central would be the tenth largest corporation in the nation, with assets of $5 billion and nearly 185,000 employees. H. Roger Grant notes that "Symes boasted that the combination could generate savings of $100 million annually and perhaps even more." What was not as large were net earnings and return on investment. The Penn Central would be far down the list of U.S. railroads in terms of profitability. In spite of this, Symes declared the merger would "preserve and strengthen these railroads in the public interest and for the national defense, to arrest their physical deterioration of the last fifteen years, and to avert possible bankruptcy that could eventually lead to nationalization."

Nearly as difficult for the proposed Penn Central managers was the request to the ICC by the trustees of the New York, New Haven and Hartford Railroad, bankrupted in 1961, for inclusion into the new Penn Central. The New Haven, primarily a Boston to New York line, heavily engaged in money-losing long-haul and local passenger operations. Under questioning, both Symes and Perlman rejected the notion of including the New Haven into the Penn Central. Both preferred the New Haven to be merged into a New England system which would include the Boston and Maine, along with the Central's own subsidiary, the Boston and Albany. Perlman's comments on this proposed New England system were dubious at best, as he also testified to the ICC that the Boston and Albany was a "marginal operation that regularly lost money." The Boston and Maine was struggling under its own debt load and itself went bankrupt in 1970. Neither Symes nor Perlman offered an explanation of how one marginally-successful road could be integrated into a bankrupt road and a soon to be bankrupt road and be made to perform. What was clear was that both men, with decades in the railroad industry, viewed the New Haven as outright poison. Symes testified that if inclusion of the New Haven were made a condition of the merger he would recommend to his board that the merger not "go forward." Perlman was even more adamant, stating that "should this railroad, with all its inefficiencies and its liabilities today, be taken over by systems that are still solvent, without first being made to help itself . . . it would be a grave mistake and a burden on interstate commerce and not in the public interest."

On October 1, 1963, one day before ICC hearings on the Penn Central merger ended, Symes stepped down as chairman of the Pennsy board (he would remain as chairman of the board's Executive Committee through 1968). In letter full of praise to C. Jared Ingersoll, chairman of board committee searching for Symes' replacement, Symes recommended Stuart T. Saunders; the board unanimously elected Saunders as Chairman/CEO effective October 1, 1963. As the merger approached, Symes and Saunders found themselves embroiled in political battle for the governorship of the state of Pennsylvania, where Democratic candidate Milton J. Shapp ran on a platform which included dire predictions against the proposed merger. One of Shapp's key charges was that the new company would re-route freight traffic out of Pennsylvania and onto former Central routes through New York state.

Concessions by Penn Central management to employees (inclusion of the bankrupt New Haven, reinstatement of laid-off workers, job protection agreements) finally overcame objections from the Johnson administration's Department of Justice, which ended its opposition in November, 1967. The Penn Central merger finally went into effect on February 1, 1968, at which time Penn Central was the 10th largest business in the U.S., with more than 100,000 employees, 20,000 route miles of track, and operations in fourteen states and two Canadian provinces. At the end of 1961, the two roads had 120,416 employees, 247,766 freight cars, 7,009 passenger cars and 4,805 locomotives. On the last day of 1968 the Penn Central totals stood at 94,453 employees, 187,362 freight cars, 4,976 passenger cars and 4,404 units; 21% fewer employees; 24% fewer freight cars, 29% fewer passenger cars.

== The birth of Conrail and the death of Symes ==
The merger proved to be one of the largest debacles in corporate history. On January 1, 1969, as part of the Interstate Commerce Commission's conditions to approve the merger, the New Haven was absorbed as well. Within just two years, the Penn Central became the largest bankruptcy in U.S. history to that time. Adversarial management teams, poorly planned attempts to diversify away from railroading, failure to adopt a standardized computer system, years of deferred maintenance, federal regulation and federally subsidized competition (the interstate highway system, the St. Lawrence seaway), coupled with deindustrialization in the heart of the Penn Central's territory, quickly overwhelmed the company. Failure to integrate the computer system alone meant that the company lost waybills, lost freight cars and clogged rail yards. Freight customers, who had the option of switching to sea or truck, took their business elsewhere. The role of the New Haven remains disputed. Symes stated to Daughen and Binzen that the inclusion of the New Haven was a major factor in the collapse of Penn Central. Symes' hand-picked successor, Stuart T. Saunders, disagreed. In 1970, after two years of losses and major under-performance in freight and passenger rail operations, Penn Central announced in February, 1970 that 1969 rail operations generated a loss of $56 million versus $5.1 million for the year before. Ominously, income dropped from $88 million to $4.38 million between 1968 and 1969. As a Securities and Exchange Commission investigation later noted, these reports "[ended] confidence in its commercial paper in the financial community."

From spring through summer 1970, Penn Central's financial position with the financial community declined precipitously, the first quarter losses being reported as $100 million, compared to $220 for the entire twelve months of 1969. The company was $2.6 billion in debt. Large investors and financial institutions sold the company's stock. Chase Manhattan Bank's own analysts' negative forecasts for Penn Central led the company to sell more than 134,000 shares on May 22, 1970. Four days later, Chase's Investment Department officially changed its recommendation to "sell". Penn Central was rapidly using up its lines of credit and unable to secure additional funding for operations through private institutions. Saunders approached the federal government for financing via United States Secretary of Transportation John A. Volpe, noting the company had reached its borrowing capacity. (Perhaps Penn Central could be financed federally under the Defense Production Act?) When the United States Department of Defense announced it could subsidize Penn Central to the amount of $200 million, the parties were blocked by Congressman Wright Patman, chairman of the House Banking and Currency Committee, and the Senate Commerce Committee. This story broke in The Wall Street Journal on June 12, 1970. The same day Saunders and Perlman submitted their resignations to the Penn Central board. Attempts by the Nixon administration and Penn Central officials on June 20 failed to change Patman's views; no federal funding would be forthcoming. The following day, after a special board meeting, the Penn Central Transportation Company filed for Chapter 77 bankruptcy protection. The company Jim Symes worked for more than ten years to create lost over a half-million dollars a day by 1970, but the board of directors continued paying cash dividends; some subsidiaries would not stop paying dividends until a month after the parent company declared bankruptcy.

Penn Central struggled on for over five more years as managers and politicians sought solutions to the railroad problems of the Northeast. The political solution turned out to be Conrail. Railway Age reported that in January 1976, Penn Central had 8,478 route miles under slow orders. In February Railway Age reported Penn Central suffered 1783 derailments in the first two months of the year, an increase of 878 percent for the same period in 1975. When Conrail took over on April 1, 1976, Trains magazine pointed out it had 95,000 employees, 4,877 locomotives, and 162,000 freight cars; it owned one of every ten U.S. rail cars, one in every six locomotives, employed one in every five rail employees. Of its locomotive fleet, 493, or ten percent, were out of service. According to The New York Times, among management's first acts was to cut over 2,700 jobs and predict an annual loss of $364 million. U.S. Railway Administration Chairman Arthur D. Lewis claimed Contrail would have a positive net income of $594 million "by 1985".

== Death ==
Symes died on August 3, 1976, in a nursing home in Feasterville, Pennsylvania, aged 79.

| Preceded by Walter S. Franklin (railroad executive) | President of the Pennsylvania Railroad; 1954 – 1959 | Succeeded by Allen J. Greenough |
