= Allen J. Greenough =

14th president of the Pennsylvania Railroad
- In office 1959–1968
- Preceded by: James M. Symes

Personal details
- Born: September 20, 1905; San Francisco, California, U.S.
- Died: September 21, 1974 (aged 69); St. Luke's Hospital; Manhattan, New York City, U.S.

Allen J. Greenough (September 20, 1905 – September 21, 1974) was the 14th and last president of the Pennsylvania Railroad.

== Private life and education ==
He was born on September 20, 1905, in San Francisco, California, to Ernest Allen Greenough and Nellie Jackson. He married Jean Lytel on April 8, 1933. They had two children, Allen Lytel Jackson and Norman Jackson.

He was educated at Princeton Prep School in Princeton, New Jersey, until 1923. He attended Union College in Schenectady, New York, and graduated with a Bachelor of Science in civil engineering in 1928.

== Career ==
In 1928, he began work as assistant on Engineering Corps, Pennsylvania Railroad; subsequently, all with Pennsylvania; 1929 to 1933, assistant supervisor, track; 1933 to 1939, supervisor, track, Cincinnati, Philadelphia and New York divisions; 1939 to 1945, division engineer, Columbus and Pittsburgh divisions; 1945 to 1946, superintendent, Wilkes-Barre Division, Sunbury, Pennsylvania; 1946 to 1947, superintendent, freight transportation, Chicago; 1947 to 1948, superintendent, Maryland Division, Baltimore, Maryland; 1948 to 1950, general superintendent, Harrisburg, Pennsylvania; 1950 to 1951, assistant general manager, Philadelphia, Pennsylvania; 1953 to 1953, general manager, Pittsburgh, Pennsylvania; 1953 to 1955, vice-president, Eastern Region, Philadelphia; 1955 to 1959, vice-president, transportation and maintenance, system, headquarters, Philadelphia; 1959 to 1968, president and director, Pennsylvania Railroad.

He served as a director for Lehigh Valley Railroad, Detroit, Toledo and Ironton, United New Jersey Railroad and Canal; Manor Real Estate, Girard Trust, Corn Exchange Bank, Merchants Warehouse Company, and trustee, Penn Mutual Life Insurance.

Time magazine reported Greenough's promotion to president of the self-styled "Standard Railroad of the World" early in November 1959: "After the Pennsylvania Railroad's board of directors finished its regular meeting last week in Philadelphia, a telephone call went through to summon Allen J. Greenough, 54, vice president in charge of transportation and maintenance. Walking into the president's office, Greenough was hit with the biggest surprise of his career: he had just been named president of the Pennsy, jumping over the heads of other officers who had hoped to get the job. The new post put Greenough in line as heir to James M. Symes, who moved up from president to chairman."

=== New York Central merger ===
Within a decade the vaunted Pennsylvania was gone in an ill-starred merger with arch-rival New York Central. Conflicted management teams, failure to produce an integrated computer system, internal strife, deindustrialization, federal regulation, taxation, declining passenger and express traffic and fierce competition from trucks via the Federally subsidized interstate highway system and shipping on the Saint Lawrence Seaway. Though both the Pennsylvania and the Central struggled through the 1950s on the dividends from their large investments in border state coal haulers—the Chesapeake and Ohio and the Norfolk and Western—the Penn Central merger created a massive system from two weakened giants. Exacerbating the situation, the Interstate Commerce Commission foisted the nearly bankrupt New York, New Haven and Hartford Railroad onto the new company. The New Haven, running between Boston and New York, was heavily involved in money-losing commuter traffic. Transportation historian George W. Hilton recounted the New Haven's infamous request to the ICC for permission to immediately discontinue more than one hundred and fifty money losing passenger trains circa 1958.

John F. Stover wrote, in his second edition of American Railroads: "The giant new Penn Central system faced a variety of problems. One of [Penn Central President Stuart] Saunders' aids, Allen J. Greenough, said of the enlarged line: 'This is a big dog with a lot of fleas. ... We'll be scratching for a long time.' The Penn Central was official one railroad, but [New York] Central workers tried to follow their old rules, and Pennsylvania workers did likewise. The two old lines had very different signal and computer systems. The result in 1968 and 1969 was lost waybills lost freight shipments, even one lost train. By early 1970 a major problem was having to borrow capital at eight to ten percent for a railroad earning one or two percent. Penn Central was now losing one million dollars a day. On Sunday, June 21, 1970, Penn Central filed for bankruptcy, one of the biggest business failures in United States history."

== Death ==
Greenough died September 21, 1974, at St. Luke's Hospital in Manhattan, New York City. He was 69 years old and he had homes in both North Salem, New York and County Clare, Ireland.

== Memberships ==
New York Railroad Club, American Railway Engineering Association, Presbyterian; Republican, Freemasonry Sundbury Lodge 713, Williamsport, Pennsylvania Consistory, Thirty-second Degree Zembo Shrine. The Round Hill Club, Pine Valley Golf Club, Rolling Rock Club, The Metropolitan Club, New York Presidents Club, and the Chi Psi executive council.

== Legacy ==
In 1976 the US government created the Consolidated Rail Corporation (Conrail) to handle the former Penn Central components, along with other bankrupt or financially struggling lines in the industrial Northeast. Included among the roads were the Ann Arbor, Central Railroad of New Jersey, Erie Lackawanna, Lehigh and Hudson River, Lehigh Valley, and the Reading. Conrail was privatized in 1986 and sold to CSX and Norfolk Southern between 1998 and 1999, CSX taking most of the former Central routes, and NS taking most of the former Pennsylvania components. Ironically, CSX and NS are the corporate descendants of the Appalachian coal haulers that once subsidized the Central and the Pennsylvania.

Preceded by James M. Symes	President of the Pennsylvania Railroad; 1959 – 1968	Succeeded by no successor
