= James McCrea =

American railroad executive (1848–1913)

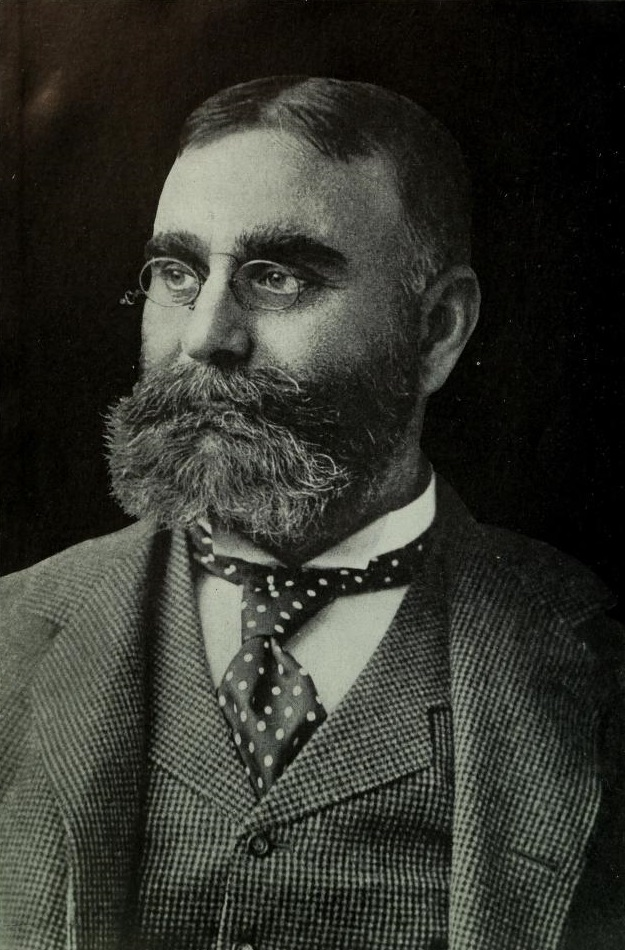
- Born: May 1, 1848; Philadelphia, Pennsylvania, U.S.
- Died: March 28, 1913 (aged 64); Haverford, Pennsylvania, U.S.
- Resting place: West Laurel Hill Cemetery, Bala Cynwyd, Pennsylvania, U.S.
- Education: Pennsylvania Polytechnic College
- Occupation: Businessman
- Spouse: Ada Jane Montgomery (m. 1873)
- Children: 3

James McCrea (May 1, 1848–1913) was an American businessman who was president of the Pennsylvania Railroad from 1907 to 1913. He was also president of the Philadelphia, Baltimore and Washington Railroad; Northern Central Railway; West Jersey and Seashore Railroad; and Pittsburgh, Cincinnati, Chicago and St. Louis Railroad.

== Early life and education ==
McCrea was born May 1, 1848, in Philadelphia to James Alexander McCrea and Ann Bispham Foster. He studied civil engineering at Pennsylvania Polytechnic College.

== Career ==
He began railroad work with the Connellsville & Southern Pennsylvania Railroad in June 1865. In December 1867, he worked as a rodman on the Wilmington & Reading Railroad and then as an assistant engineer with the Allegheny Valley Railroad. In March 1871, he worked with the Pennsylvania Railroad as principal assistant engineer. In 1874, he worked as assistant engineer of the Philadelphia division. In 1875, he worked as superintendent of the middle division, and then of the New York division in October 1878. In 1882 he was appointed manager of the Southwest system and then general manager of all the Pennsylvania Railroad lines west of Pittsburgh in October 1885. He was appointed to a series of vice president roles beginning in November 1887.

In June 1899 he was named a director of the Pennsylvania Railroad when Alexander Cassatt was made company president. When Cassatt died in January 1907, McCrea became the president and held the position until January 1913, when he resigned, in part because of his health. During his presidency, the tunnel extension under the Hudson River and New York City station were opened.

McCrea also served as president of the Philadelphia, Baltimore and Washington Railroad; Northern Central Railway; West Jersey and Seashore Railroad; and Pittsburgh, Cincinnati, Chicago and St. Louis Railroad.

McCrea was elected to the American Philosophical Society in 1910. He was a trustee of the University of Pennsylvania, as well as a member of the Philadelphia Club and the Merion Cricket Club.

McCrea died March 28, 1913, at Ballyheather, his home at Haverford, Pennsylvania. He was interred at West Laurel Hill Cemetery, in Bala Cynwyd, Pennsylvania.

== Personal life ==
He married Ada Jane Montgomery on February 12, 1873, and the couple had three children. The oldest son, James Alexander McCrea, followed his father in a career with the Pennsylvania Railroad.

Preceded by Alexander Cassatt	President of Pennsylvania Railroad; 1907 – 1913	Succeeded by Samuel Rea
