= Samuel Rea =

American engineer (1855–1929)

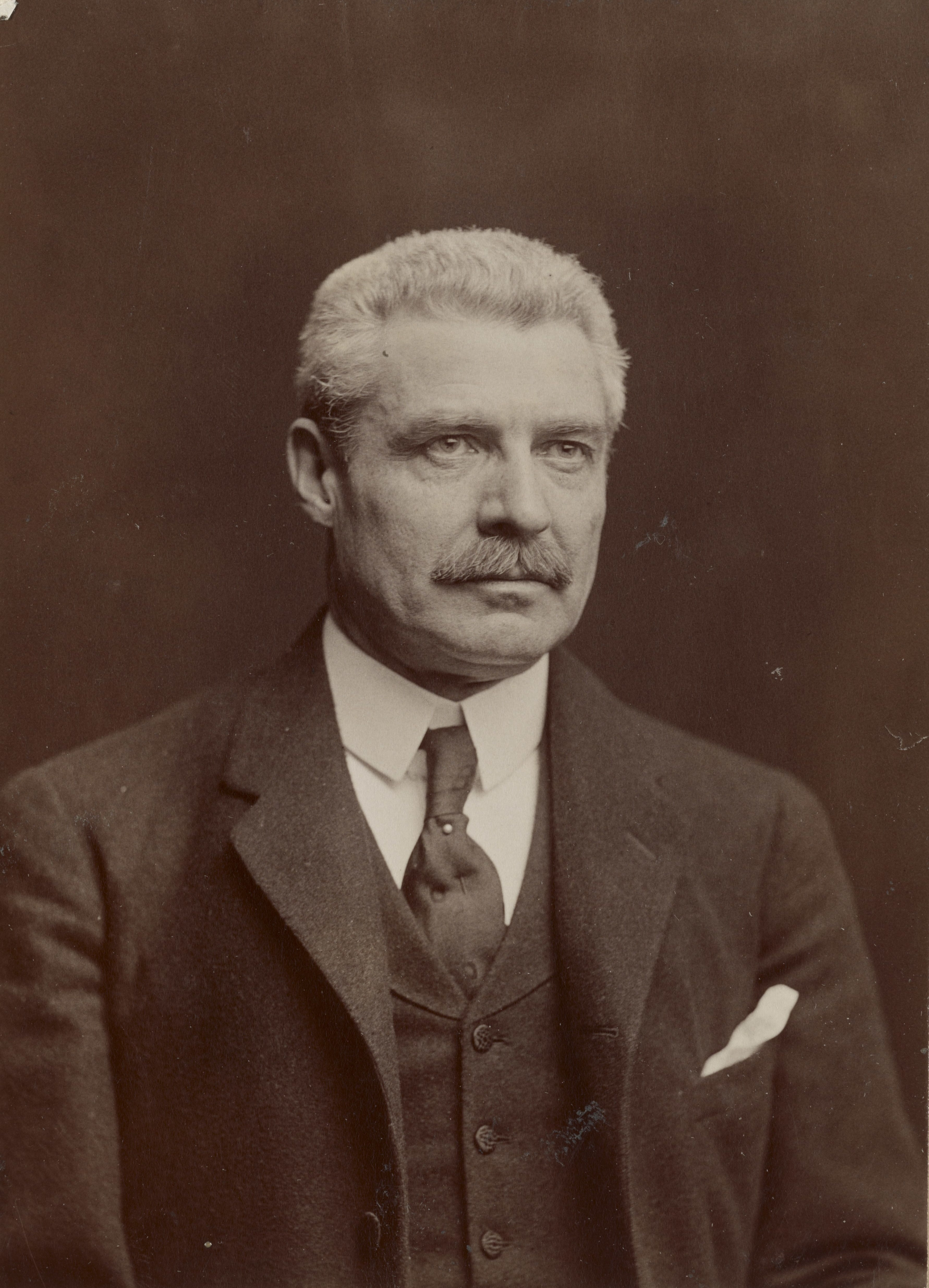
- Samuel Rea, c. 1905
- Born: September 21, 1855; Hollidaysburg, Pennsylvania, U.S.
- Died: March 24, 1929 (aged 73); Gladwyne, Pennsylvania, U.S.
- Known for: President of the Pennsylvania Railroad (1913 –1925)
- Spouse: Mary Black (m. 1879)
- Children: 2
- Awards: Franklin Medal (1926)

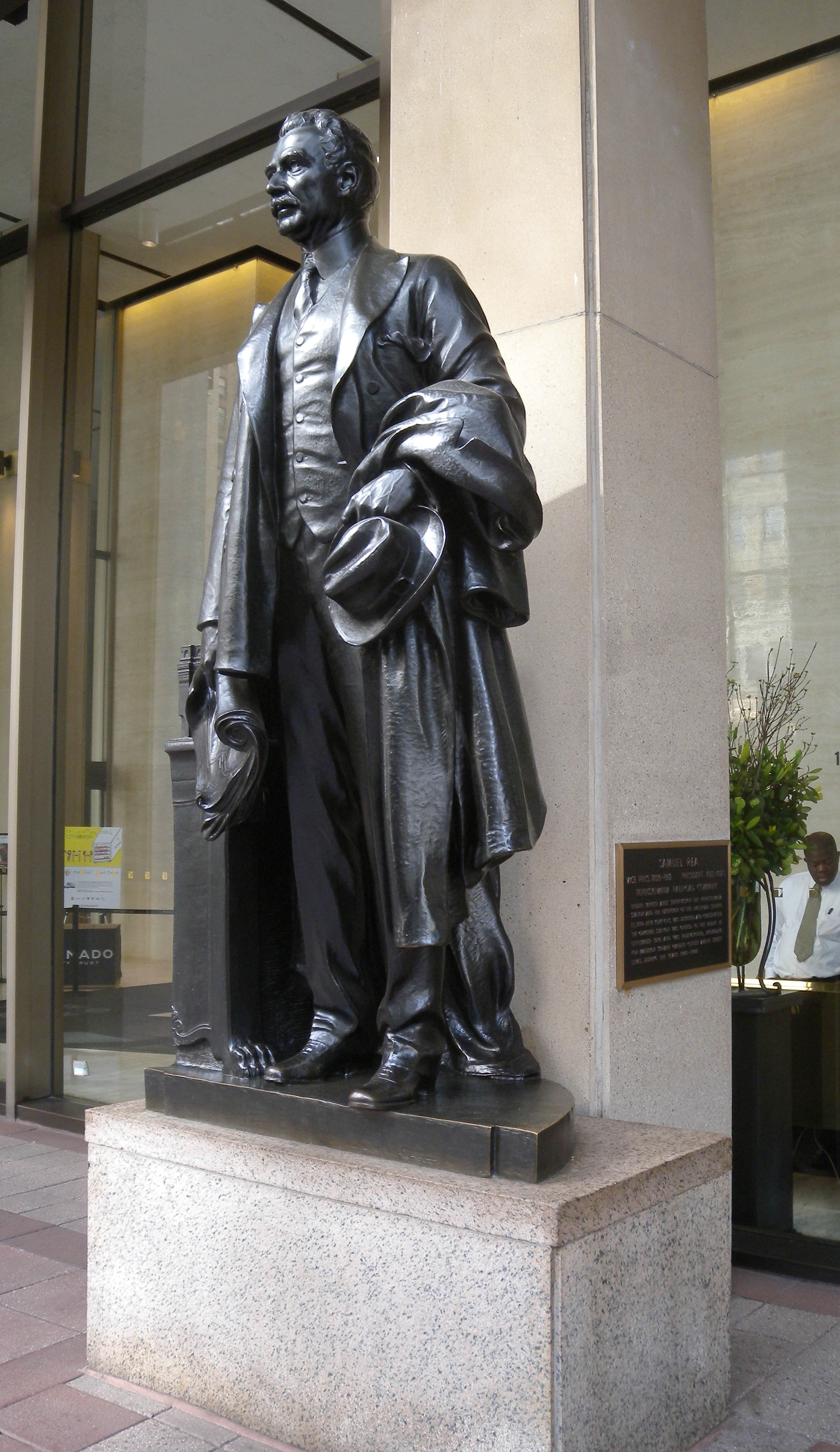
Rea statue in New York City's Pennsylvania Station

Samuel Rea (September 21, 1855 – March 24, 1929) was an American engineer and the ninth president of the Pennsylvania Railroad, serving from 1913 to 1925. He joined the PRR in 1871, when the railroad had hardly outgrown its 1846 charter to build from Harrisburg to Pittsburgh, and helped it grow to a 12,000-mile (19,000 km) system with access to Manhattan, upstate New York, and New England.

Rea was elected to the American Philosophical Society in 1913, awarded the Franklin Medal in 1926, and was elected as an honorary member of the Institution of Civil Engineers in 1928.

== Early life and career ==
Samuel Rea was born on September 21, 1855, in Hollidaysburg, Pennsylvania. His parents were James D. Rea and Ruth Blair Moore. His paternal grandfather, General John Rea, was the United States representative from Bedford and Franklin, Pennsylvania, during the terms of Thomas Jefferson and James Madison. Through the marriage of his father's siblings, he was related to the Asa Childs and the Henry Clay Frick families. His father died when Samuel was 13.

He began his vocational life as a clerk in a country store. In 1871, at age 16, he took a job as a rodman, or surveyor's assistant, with the Pennsylvania Railroad (PRR), where he would spend most of his career. He left the PRR in 1875 to work for the Pittsburgh and Lake Erie Railroad, but returned in 1879.

In the mid-1880s, Rea supported a proposal by consulting engineer Gustav Lindenthal to build a large bridge across the Hudson River from Jersey City, New Jersey, to Manhattan. Due to the enormous costs of the proposal, a decision on the project would not come for many years. By 1886, when he was 31, Rea was assistant engineer in the construction of chain suspension bridges over the Monongahela River at Pittsburgh. He also became a member of the New York Stock Exchange — the first to hold a seat in the city of Pittsburgh — and remained a member for 12 years. In 1888, he published a book called The Railways Terminating in London: With a Description of the Terminating Stations.

In 1889, Rea again left the PRR, frustrated by his lack of advancement within the company. He was recruited to work for the Baltimore and Ohio Railroad (B&O) by new company president Charles F. Mayer, and also became a vice president of the Maryland Central Railroad. He worked on the B&O's Belt Line project in central Baltimore, which included a new tunnel and the use of electric locomotives.

In 1892, Rea was rehired by the PRR. In his new position, he reported directly to President George Brooke Roberts, and began to explore options for crossing the Hudson. Eventually, he renewed his support for Lindenthal's bridge proposal, but other railroads declined to share the project's costs, and the financial constraints of the Panic of 1893 made that prospect unlikely for the rest of the decade. By 1900, as the economy improved, Rea and Lindenthal continued to press for the bridge project, but to no avail. The PRR then took a more serious look at building tunnels under the river, and this option was supported by Alexander Cassatt, who had become PRR president in 1899. Under Cassatt's and Rea's leadership, the New York Tunnel Extension project began in 1903 and was completed in 1910.

Rea later arranged with the New York, New Haven and Hartford Railroad to build the Hell Gate Bridge over the East River, which gave the PRR access to upstate New York and New England.

=== Pennsylvania Station ===
As it dug its Hudson tunnel, the PRR also began construction of its massive Pennsylvania Station in New York City. The project was completed under PRR president James McCrea, and the station opened in 1910. It was built to accommodate half a million daily passengers, and Rea, who became PRR president in 1913, found himself fending off charges that the station had been wastefully overbuilt. Time was to prove him right. By 1919, the station was accommodating almost 35 million travelers a year, eclipsing the nearby Grand Central Terminal as the busiest New York station. Less than a decade later, more than 60 million used it annually, enough to make it the most heavily used railroad station in North America. By 1939, its yearly traffic had reached a then-record level of almost 66 million passengers.

=== President of the Pennsylvania Railroad ===
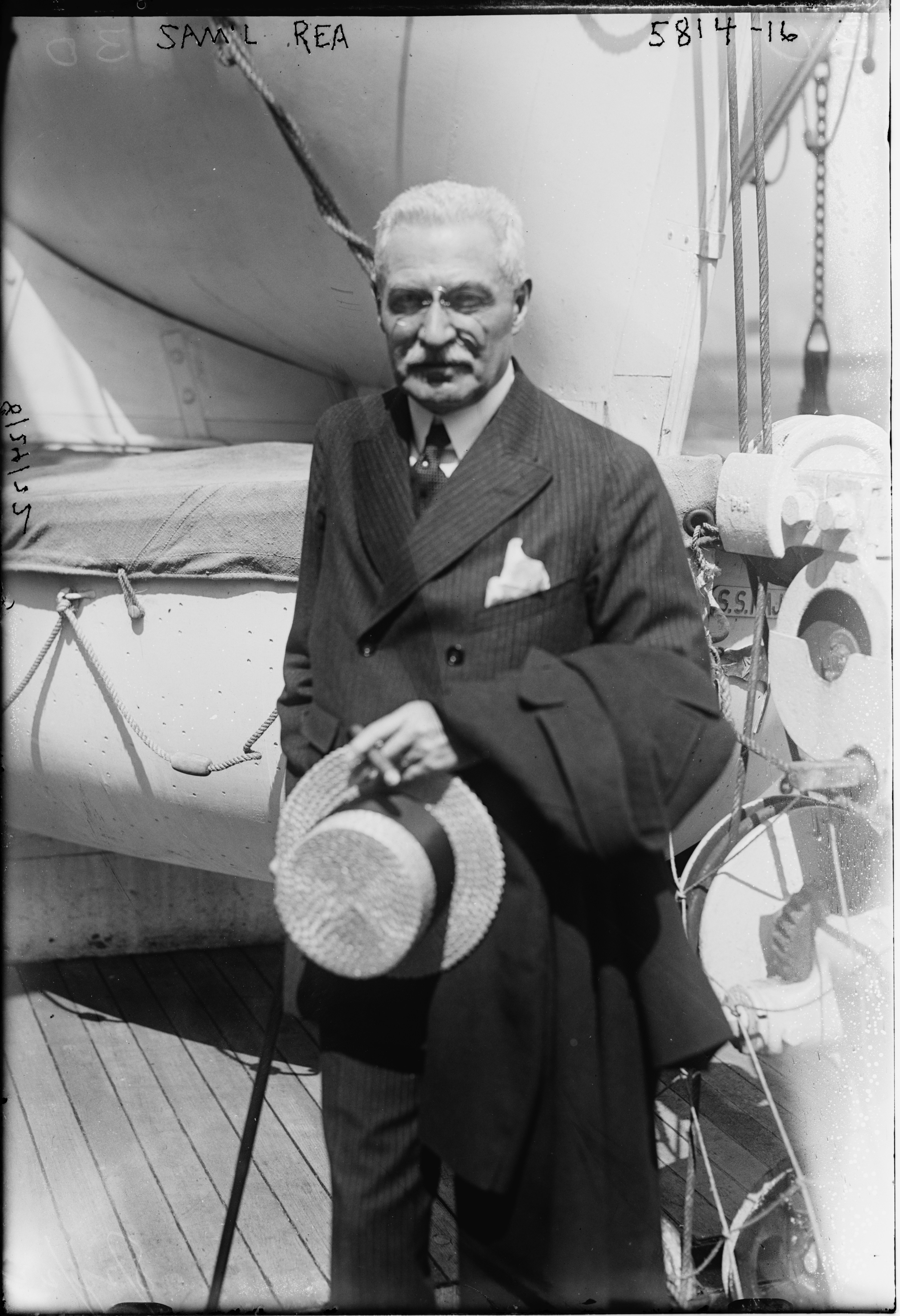
Rea c. 1922

Rea became president of the Pennsylvania Railroad in 1913. As head of the PRR system, which employed 250,000 men, he became one of the three or four dominating powers in American transportation. Rea was considered largely responsible for many features of the Esch-Cummins Act, whereby the railroads were returned to private control in 1920 after World War I.

Samuel Rea retired as PRR president in 1925 at the age of 70. He then served as president of the Long Island Rail Road, a PRR subsidiary, from 1923 to 1928.

=== Professional recognition ===
Samuel Rea was awarded honorary degrees by the University of Pennsylvania, Princeton University and Lafayette College. He received the Franklin Medal in 1926, and was elected as an Honorary Member of the Institution of Civil Engineers in 1928.

== Personal life ==
Rea married Mary Black, the daughter of Jane Black, in 1879. In 1880, Samuel and Mary lived with her widowed mother and family in Allegheny, Pennsylvania. Their children, born after 1880, include George Rea and Ruth Rea.

Rea was a member of the exclusive South Fork Fishing and Hunting Club, whose earthen dam failed in May 1889, causing the Johnstown Flood. After the flood, Rea removed to Bryn Mawr, Pennsylvania, to an estate called "Waverly Heights," designed by architect Addison Hutton. Waverly Heights later became a lifecare community in Gladwyne.

Rea was reared in the Presbyterian faith and said he preferred reading Prof. James Moffatt's translation of the Bible.

== Death ==
He died at his home in Gladwyne, Pennsylvania on March 24, 1929.

== See also ==
- List of railroad executives

Preceded by James McCrea	President of Pennsylvania Railroad; 1913–1925	Succeeded by William W. Atterbury
