= Frank Thomson (railroad executive) =

American railroad executive (1841–1899)

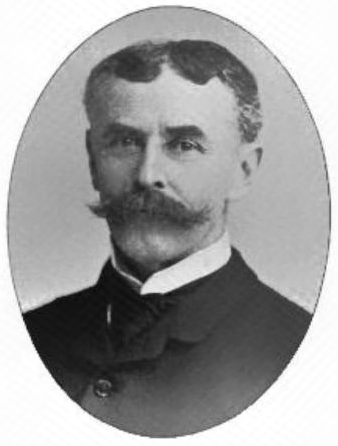
- Born: July 5, 1841; Chambersburg, Pennsylvania
- Died: June 5, 1899 (aged 57); Philadelphia, Pennsylvania
- Occupation: Railroad executive
- Years active: 1897-1899
- Known for: President of Pennsylvania Railroad
- Parent: Alexander Thomson (father)

Frank Thomson (1841–1899) was a railroad executive from the United States, and the sixth president of the Pennsylvania Railroad (PRR).

== Life ==
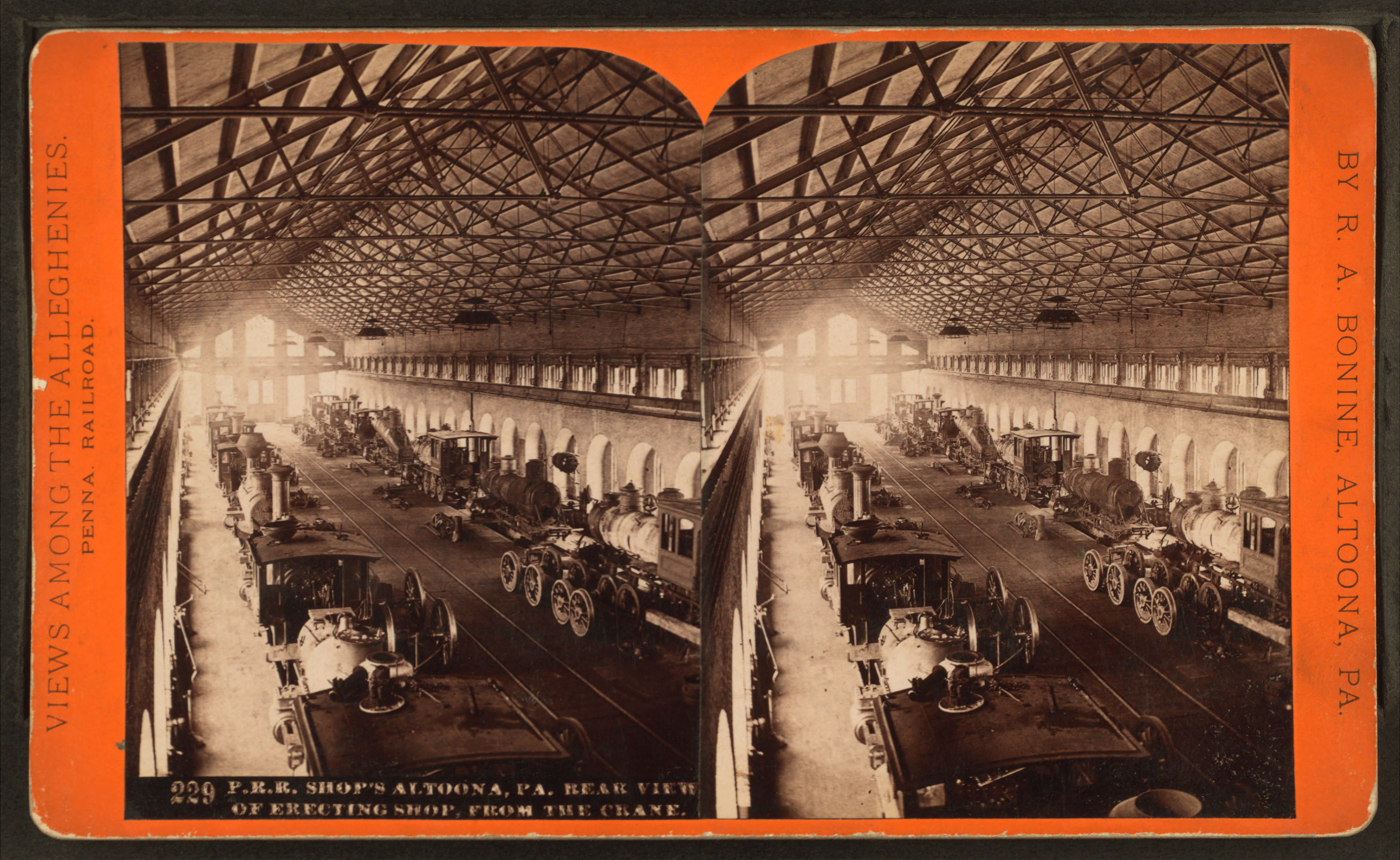
Stereoscopic view of the PRR erecting shop at Altoona (c. 1870s)

Frank Thomson was born in Chambersburg, Pennsylvania on July 5, 1841, the son of Judge Alexander Thomson. At age 17, Thomson became an apprentice in the PRR machine shops in Altoona, and studied mechanical engineering there for four years. Thomson gained experience with restoring shops, repair of rolling stock and machinery, the rebuilding of bridges and the construction of new roads and telegraph lines. Later in his life, the press often commented he could both build a locomotive and act as its engineer.

He enlisted in the Union Army in 1861 during the American Civil War, and served as chief assistant to Colonel Thomas A. Scott, later the PRR's fourth president. As assistant to Scott, Thomson built railroads and bridges as well as directed the transport of troops and supplies. Thomson was relieved of military duty in June 1864, and appointed Superintendent of the Eastern Division of the Philadelphia and Erie Railroad. He served in this position until 1873, when he was appointed Superintendent of Motive Power of the PRR at Altoona, and in 1874, General Manager of the PRR system east of Pittsburgh and Erie. Under Thomson's management, the railroad saw equipment of a superior quality become the standard, as well as the building of picturesque stations. In 1874, Thomson was elected as a member to the American Philosophical Society.

He became a PRR vice-president in 1882, and was promoted to be the sixth president in 1897. Thomson instituted a system of track inspection, and was said to be instrumental in standardizing track and roadbed.

Thomson had a daughter, Anne, and two sons, Frank G. and Clarke. He was also an avid outdoorsman, and struck up a friendship with William F. Cody, otherwise known as Buffalo Bill, who took him buffalo hunting. Thomson hosted scores of distinguished European and American visitors at his hunting cabin at Corkerhill. He also served as director of the Equitable Life Assurance Society.

He died on June 5, 1899, in Merion, Pennsylvania after a two-week illness.

== Legacy ==
Following his death, his children established the Frank Thomson Scholarship as a memorial to their father. Thomson had a lifelong interest in the education of the youth of his fellow employees, and he devoted himself to helping them obtain an education. Today, the Scholarship are offered annually to provide assistance toward tuition and additional necessary expenses for undergraduate study at generally recognized and accepted colleges and universities.

== See also ==
- List of railroad executives

== Footnotes ==
Preceded by George Brooke Roberts	President of Pennsylvania Railroad; 1897 – 1899	Succeeded by Alexander Cassatt
