= William Wallace Atterbury =

Brigadier general in the United States Army (1866–1935)

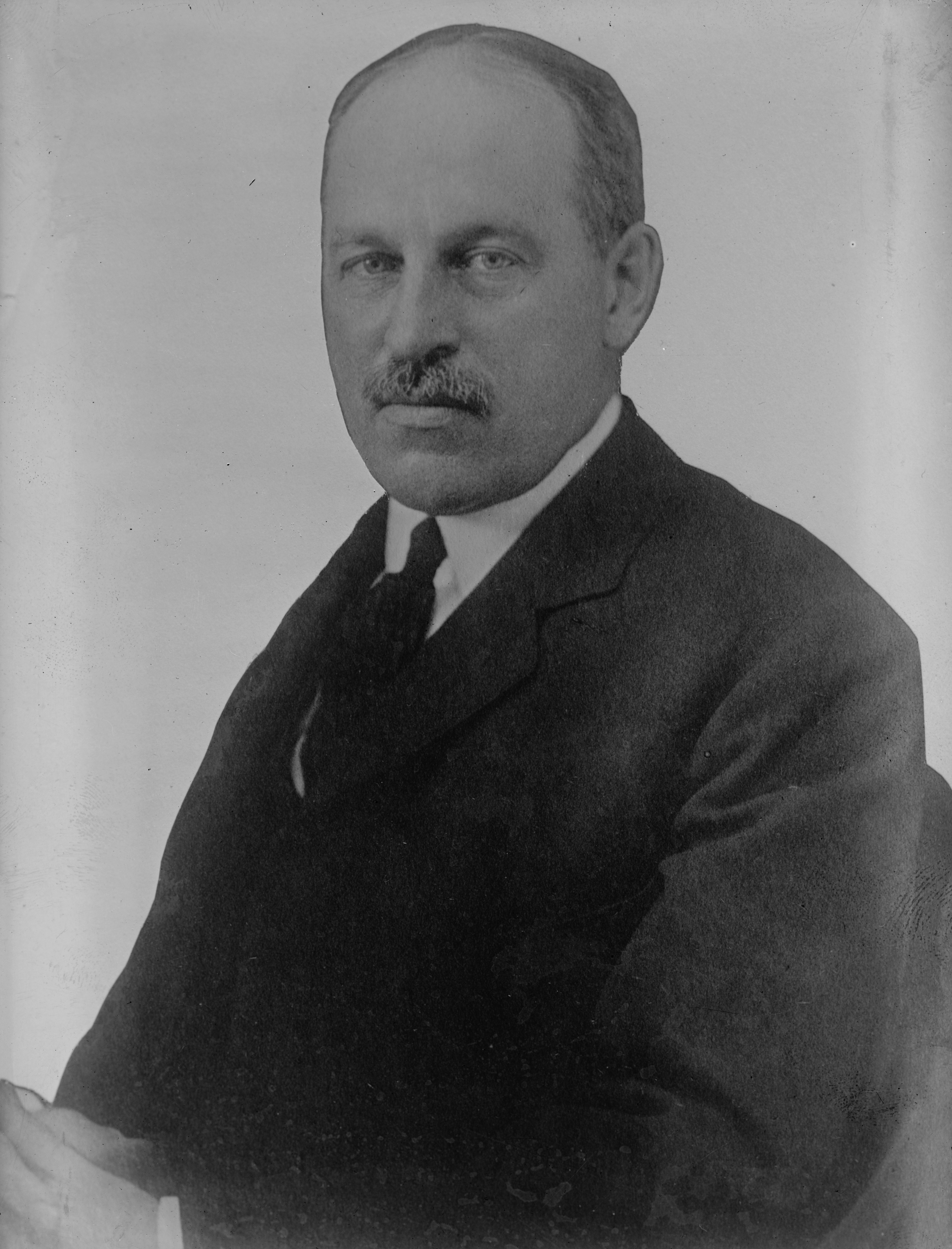
- Atterbury c. 1913

Member of the Republican National Committee from Pennsylvania
- In office May 12, 1928 – October 10, 1930
- Preceded by: George Pepper
- Succeeded by: Jay Cooke

Personal details
- Born: January 31, 1866 New Albany, Indiana, U.S.
- Died: September 20, 1935 (aged 69) Bryn Mawr, Pennsylvania, U.S.
- Resting place: St. David's Episcopal Church, Radnor, Pennsylvania, U.S.
- Party: Republican
- Spouse(s): Matilda Hoffman (m. November 13, 1895 – her death in 1910); Arminia (Rosengarten) MacLeod (m. June 10, 1915 – his death in 1935)
- Children: Malcolm MacLeod Atterbury (adopted); George Rosengarten MacLeod Atterbury (adopted); William W. Atterbury Jr.
- Military career
- Allegiance: United States
- Branch: United States Army
- Service years: 1917–1920
- Rank: Brigadier General
- Unit: American Expeditionary Forces
- Commands: Transportation Department, American Expeditionary Forces
- Conflicts: World War I
- Awards: Army Distinguished Service Medal; Legion of Honor (Commander) (France); Order of the Bath (Companion) (England); Order of the White Eagle (Poland); Order of the Crown (Grand Officer) (Romania)
- Education: Yale University (Ph.B.)

William Wallace Atterbury (January 31, 1866 – September 20, 1935) was a brigadier general in the United States Army during World War I, who began his career with the Pennsylvania Railroad (PRR) in 1886 and rose through the ranks to become its tenth president (1925–1935). As director-general of transportation in France during the war, the New Albany, Indiana, native and Yale University graduate was instrumental in reorganizing railroad traffic for more efficient transportation of troops and supplies for the American Expeditionary Forces. He was also known as "The Railroad General". Under his leadership after the war, the Pennsylvania Railroad undertook a $250 million project to electrify major portions of its main line that ran between New York City and Washington, D.C. He also assisted in development of the company's first M1-class steam locomotive.

Atterbury, who was a recipient of the U.S. Army's Distinguished Service Medal, also received honors from France, England, Serbia, and Romania for his wartime military service. In addition, Atterbury was awarded honorary degrees from Yale, the University of Pennsylvania, Villanova University, and Temple University. Camp Atterbury, a former U.S. Army training camp west of Edinburgh, Indiana, and Atterbury Army Airfield (later named Bakalar Air Force Base and the present-day Columbus, Indiana, municipal airport) were named in his memory.

== Early life and education ==
William Wallace Atterbury was born in New Albany, Indiana, on January 31, 1866. He was the seventh son of Catherine Jones (Larned) and John Guest Atterbury, a former lawyer who became a Presbyterian missionary minister.

Atterbury, the youngest of twelve children, attended Yale University's Sheffield Scientific School, where he received a Ph.B. in 1886. While attending Yale, Atterbury joined the Chi Phi fraternity.

== Marriage and family ==
Atterbury married Matilda "Minnie" Hoffman on November 13, 1895, in Fort Wayne, Indiana. She died in 1910.

On June 10, 1915, Atterbury married Arminia Clara (Rosengarten) MacLeod of Philadelphia, Pennsylvania. Atterbury adopted MacLeod's sons, Malcolm, an actor known for Perry Mason among other works and George. William and Arminia had a son named William Wallace Atterbury Jr. (1916–1995). The Atterbury family resided in Radnor, a suburb of Philadelphia.

== Career ==
=== Early years ===
In 1886 Atterbury began work as an apprentice in the Pennsylvania Railroad's shops at Altoona, earning five cents an hour. Atterbury rose through the ranks to become general superintendent of motive power at the Altoona Works in 1901, a general manager of the Pennsylvania Railroad's lines east of Pittsburgh in 1903, and a company vice president in charge of transportation in 1909. On May 8, 1912, the railroad company named him a vice president in charge of operations. In 1916 Atterbury also became president of the American Railway Association.

=== World War I military service ===
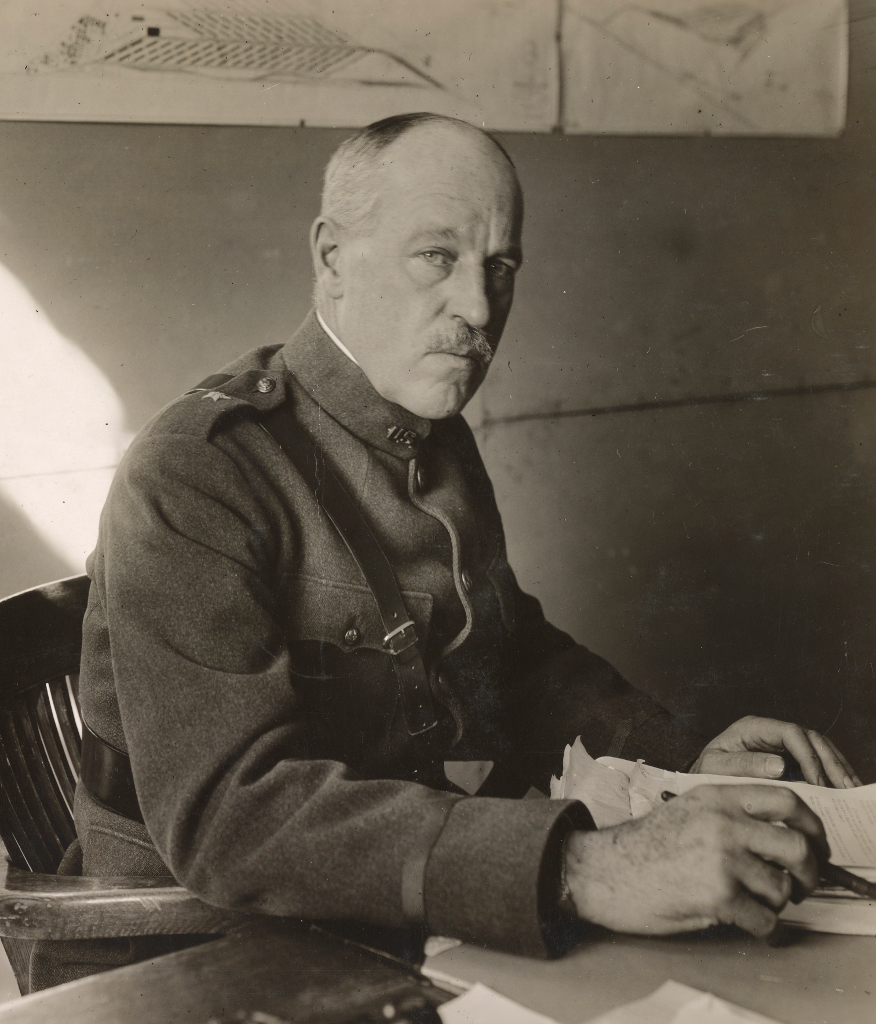
Brigadier General Atterbury in October 1918.

On August 6, 1917, four months after the American entry into World War I, Atterbury was granted a leave of absence from his position with the Pennsylvania Railroad to join the American Expeditionary Forces (AEF) in France. Atterbury served as the AEF's director-general of transportation. On October 5, 1917, he was commissioned a brigadier general in the United States Army.

Between August 1917 and May 1919, Atterbury supervised construction of harbor facilities and a portion of the railways in France that were assigned to the U.S. Army for maintenance and operation. The troops in France gave him the nickname of "General Attaboy" and he was also known as "The Railroad General." Atterbury was discharged from military service on May 31, 1919, and returned to civilian life in Pennsylvania.

=== Postwar career ===
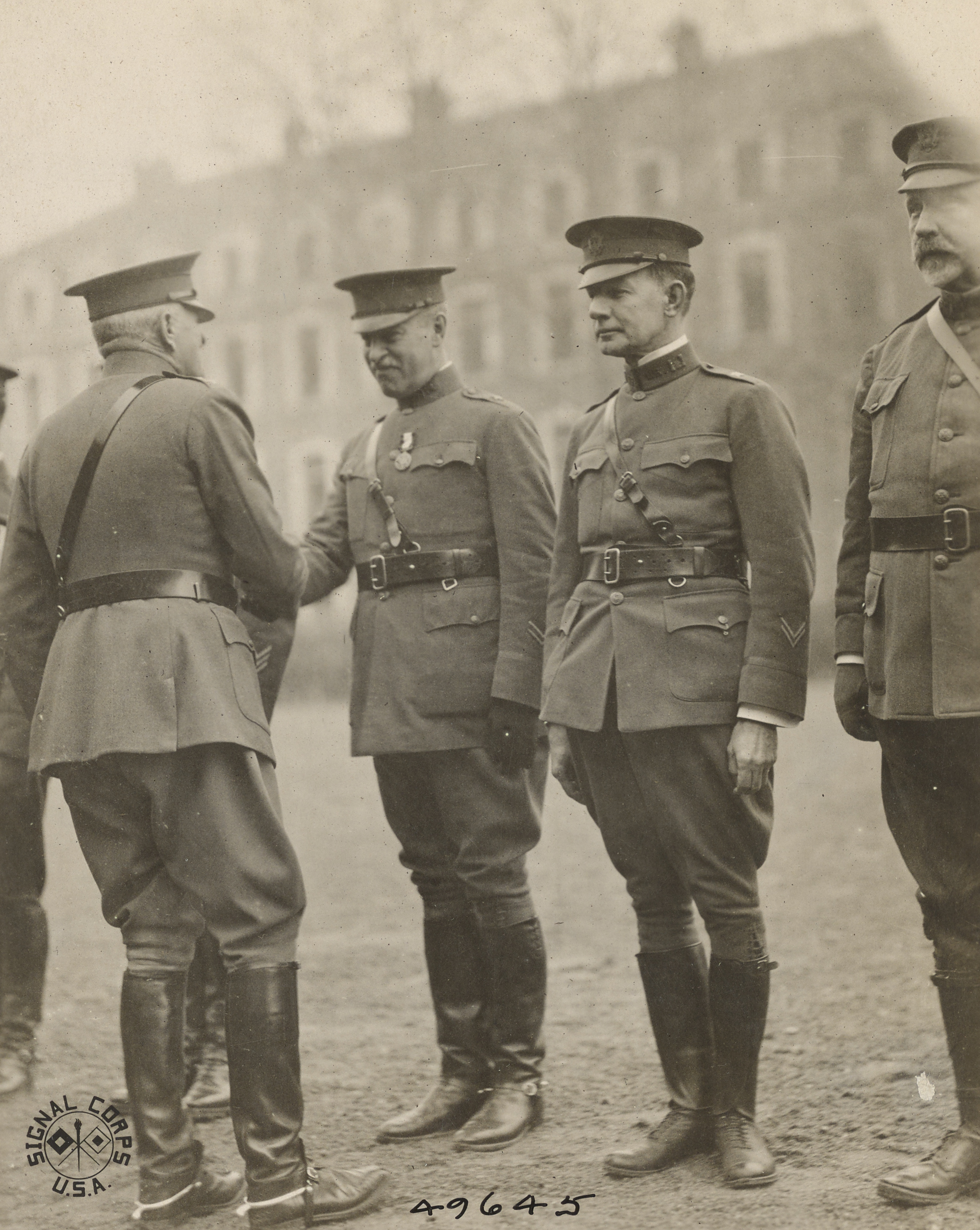
General John J. Pershing decorating Brigadier General William W. Atterbury with the Army DSM at the headquarters of the Services of Supply at Tours, Indre-et-Loire, France, January 18, 1919.

In 1920 Atterbury resumed his career with the Pennsylvania Railroad as vice president in charge of operations. On October 1, 1925, he succeeded Samuel Rea to become the tenth president of the railroad company, a position he held until 1935. During Atterbury's tenure as company president, the Pennsylvania Railroad undertook a $250 million project to electrify a 245-mile (394 km) multi-track main line that ran between New York City and Washington, D.C. Begun in 1928 and completed in 1935, it was the largest capital improvement project ever undertaken by an American railroad company up to that time. In addition, Atterbury assisted in development of the company's first M1-class steam locomotive. Atterbury retired from the railroad in 1935 due to ill health. He advocated for the consolidation of railroads and elimination of underused rail lines.

Atterbury was also active in Pennsylvania's state politics for several years. He served as a Pennsylvania delegate to the 1920 Republican National Convention and was a member of Pennsylvania's Republican State Committee. According to reports appearing in The Baltimore Sun in 1928 and The New York Times in 1930, he was elected to the Republican National Committee in 1928, but resigned from the post two years later because he refused support Gifford Pinchot, the Republican Party's gubernatorial nominee.

Atterbury served as a director on numerous boards of banking and trust institutions, railroad companies, and life insurance firms, among other businesses. He was also active in the American Society of Mechanical Engineers, the American Society of Civil Engineers, and the American Philosophical Society.

== Death and legacy ==
Atterbury died of apoplexy at Bryn Mawr Hospital in Bryn Mawr, Pennsylvania on September 20, 1935. He was buried at St. David's Episcopal Church Cemetery in Radnor, Pennsylvania.

On February 16, 1942, the U.S. War Department announced that its new military training camp under construction approximately 4 miles (6.4 km) west of Edinburgh, Indiana, would be named Camp Atterbury in his memory. In April 1943 an air field established near Camp Atterbury was renamed Atterbury Army Airfield. (It was renamed Atterbury Army Air Base in June 1943 and Bakalar Air Base in 1954.) After its deactivation as a military base, the facility began operating as a civilian airfield, known as the Columbus Municipal Airport.

== Honors and tributes ==
For his service during World War I, the U.S. Army awarded Atterbury the Army Distinguished Service Medal, the citation for which reads:

The President of the United States of America, authorized by Act of Congress, July 9, 1918, takes pleasure in presenting the Army Distinguished Service Medal to Brigadier General William W. Atterbury, United States Army, for exceptionally meritorious and distinguished services to the Government of the United States, in a duty of great responsibility, during World War I. As Director General of Transportation, in the face of almost insurmountable obstacles, General Atterbury organized and brought to a high state of efficiency the Transportation Service of the American Expeditionary Forces. The successful operation of this most important service upon which the movements and supply of the combat troops were dependent, was largely due to his energy, foresight, and ability.

He was also designated a Commander of the Legion of Honor (France), a Companion of the Most Honorable Order of the Bath (England), a Commander of the Royal Order of the White Eagle (Serbia), and a Grand Officer of the Order of the Crown (Romania).

Atterbury was awarded an honorary M.A. degree from Yale University in 1911. He also received honorary LL.Ds from the University of Pennsylvania in 1919, Yale University in 1926, Villanova University in 1927, and Temple University in 1929. The American Society of Mechanical Engineers elected Atterbury an honorary member in 1925.

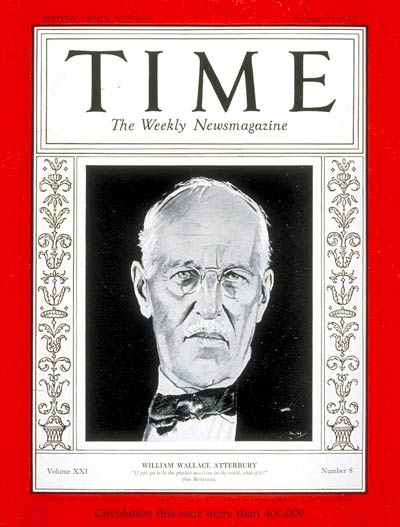
Atterbury on the cover of Time Magazine in 1933.

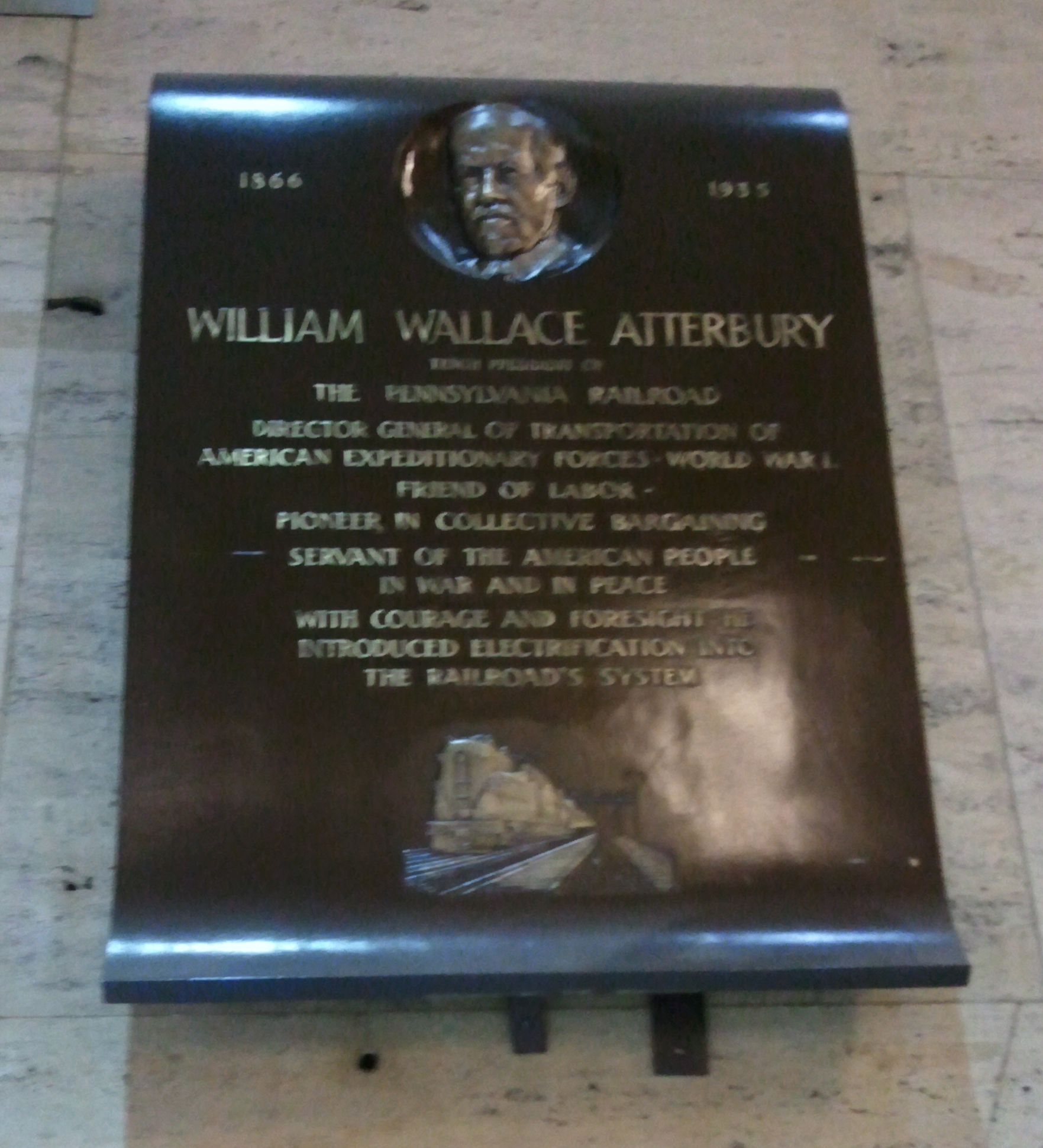
A plaque commemorating the career of William Wallace Atterbury, hanging in Philadelphia's 30th Street Station, a former Pennsylvania Railroad Station.

== See also ==
- List of railroad executives

== Notes ==
Party political offices
Preceded by George Pepper	Member of the Republican National Committee from Pennsylvania; 1928–1930	Succeeded by Jay Cooke
Other offices
Preceded by Samuel Rea	President of the Pennsylvania Railroad; 1925–1935	Succeeded by Martin Clement
