= Compton Bassett (Upper Marlboro, Maryland) =

Historic house in Maryland, United States

- U.S. National Register of Historic Places
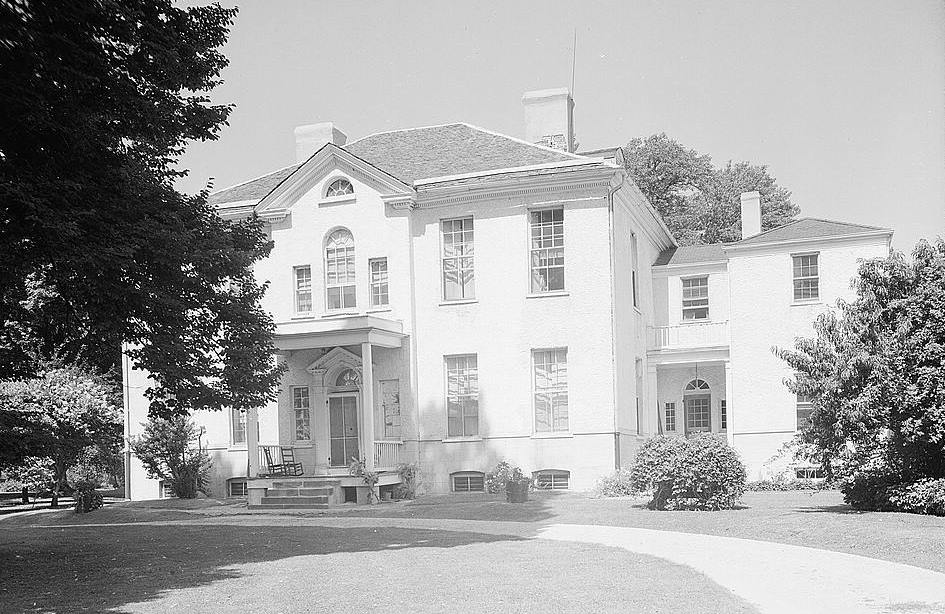
- Compton Bassett, 1936 HABS Photo

- Location within Maryland Location within the United States
- Location: 16508 Marlboro Pike, near Upper Marlboro, Maryland
- Coordinates: 38°48′55″N 76°43′1″W
- Area: 80 acres (32 ha)
- Built: 1783
- Architectural style: Georgian
- NRHP reference No.: 83002959
- Added to NRHP: March 8, 1983

Compton Bassett is a historic home in Upper Marlboro, Prince George's County, Maryland, United States, that was constructed ca. 1783. It is a two-story brick Georgian house, covered with cream-colored stucco, on a high basement of gray stucco. A two-story wing was added in 1928. Remaining outbuildings include a chapel to the southeast, a meat-house to the southwest, and a dairy to the northwest. Also on the property is a family burial ground.

The house was named after the Compton Bassett House in Wiltshire, England.

The house was built for tobacco planter Clement Hill. He was Surveyor-General of Calvert and Prince George's counties from about 1685 to 1708.

The Hill family and descendants lived at the premise from 1699 to 1900. Hills Bridge (700 meters to the southeast) has carried traffic over the Patuxent River here since a toll bridge was first constructed in 1852 by W.B. Hill.

In 1822, architect James Hoban consulted on changes to the home's exterior.

Compton Bassett was listed on the National Register of Historic Places in 1983. In July 2010 the house and grounds were acquired by the Maryland-National Capital Park and Planning Commission.

In an effort to slow down the effects of time, in 2018 the house underwent a significant structural stabilization. MNCCPC engaged the nationally recognized restoration firm The Durable Restoration Company, working with a local firm to design and build the structural framework system to reinforce the external and internal portions of the house.
