= Alexander Cassatt =

American railroad executive (1839–1906)

Alexander J. Cassatt
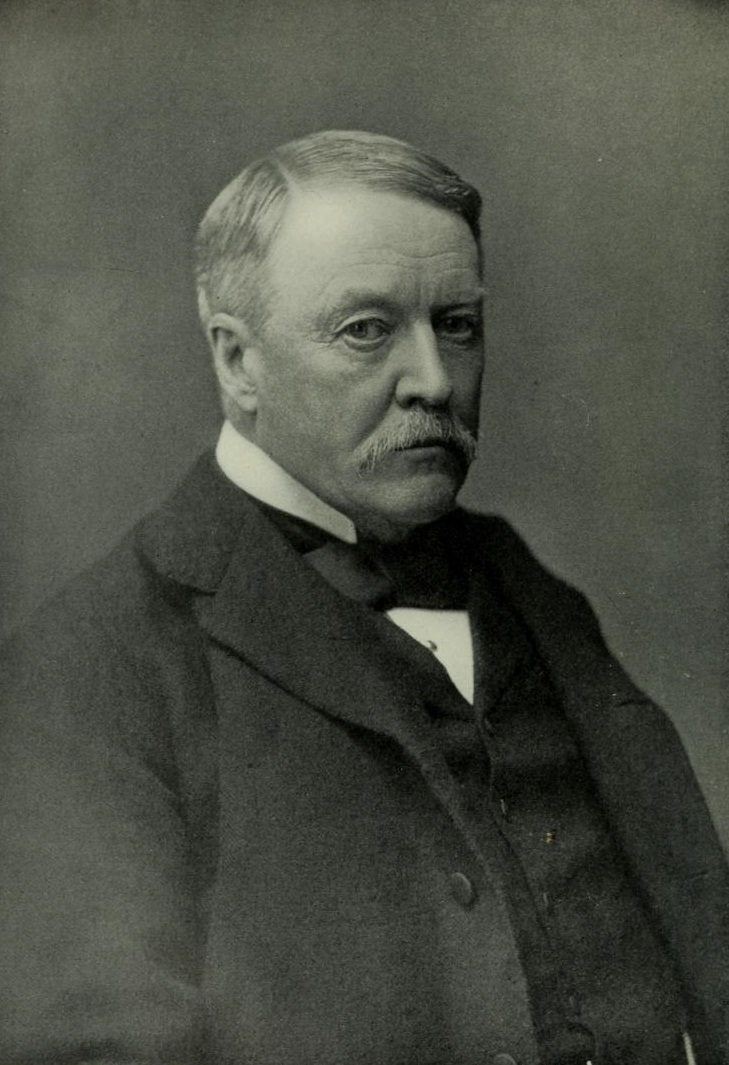
- Alexander Cassatt, c. 1890–1900.
- Born: December 8, 1839; Pittsburgh, Pennsylvania
- Died: December 28, 1906 (aged 67); Philadelphia, Pennsylvania
- Resting place: Church of the Redeemer Cemetery, Bryn Mawr, Pennsylvania
- Occupation: Railroad executive
- Years active: 1866-1906
- Known for: President of Pennsylvania Railroad
- Spouse: Lois Buchanan (1847–1920)
- Children: Edward Buchanan Cassatt (1869–1922); Katherine Kelso Cassatt (1871–1905); Robert Kelso Cassatt (1873–1944); Elsie Foster Cassatt (1875–1931)
- Relatives: Mary Cassatt, sister
- Honors: SS A. J. Cassatt

Alexander Johnston Cassatt (December 8, 1839 – December 28, 1906) was the seventh president of the Pennsylvania Railroad (PRR), serving from June 9, 1899, to December 28, 1906.

== Family and early life ==
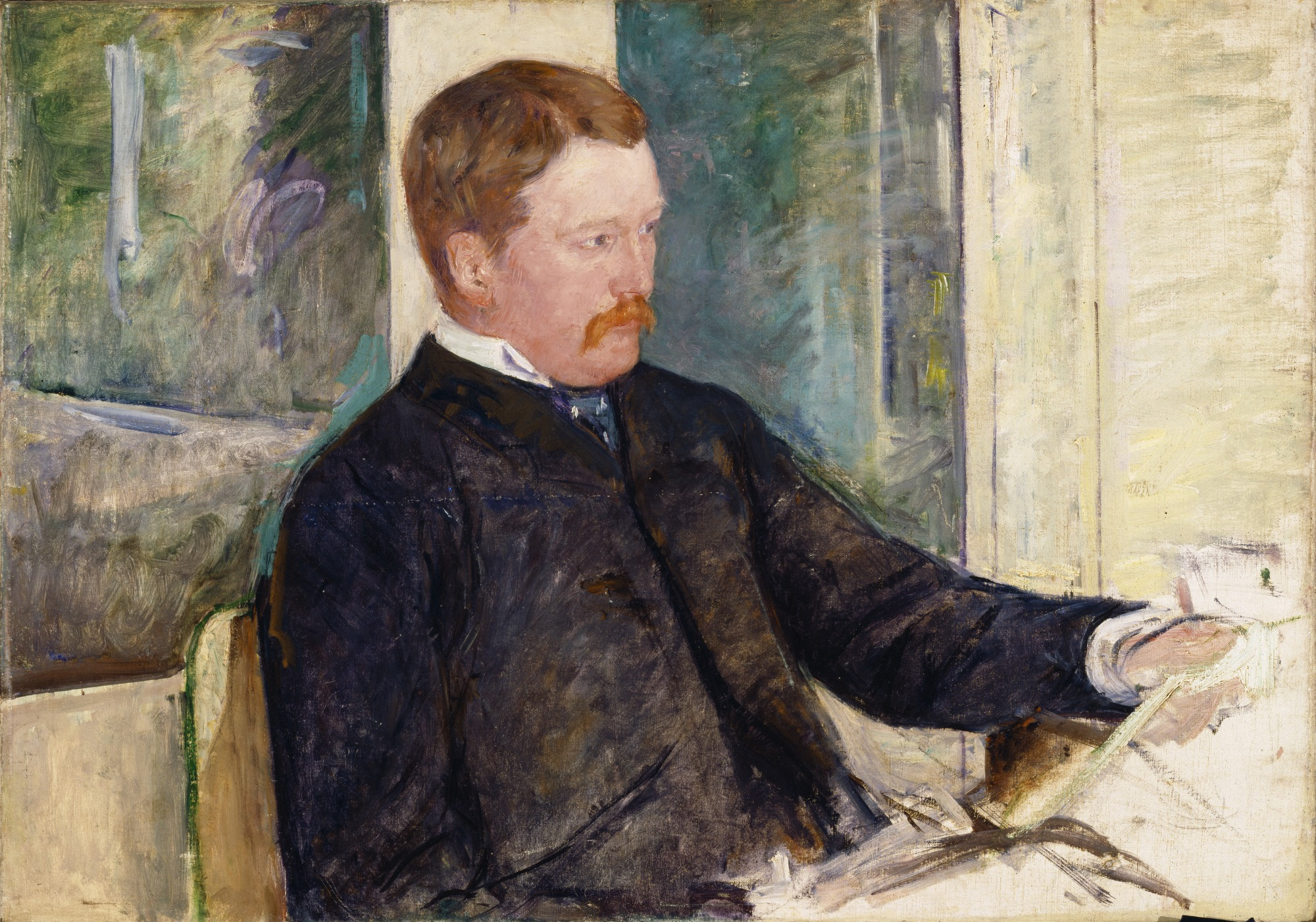
A 1880 portrait of Cassatt by his sister, Mary Cassatt

Alexander Cassatt was born on December 8, 1839, in Pittsburgh, Pennsylvania. He was the eldest of seven children born to Robert Simpson Cassat (later Cassatt), and his wife Katherine Cassatt, the former Katherine Kelso Johnston. The elder Cassatt was a successful stockbroker and land speculator who was descended from the French Huguenot Jacques Cossart, who came to New Amsterdam in 1662. The Cassatts had seven children, two of whom died in infancy; Alexander's younger sister was the impressionist painter Mary Cassatt. Their mother, Katherine, came from a banking family. She was educated and very well read. It was said that of the seven Cassatt children, Alexander most resembled his mother in "appearance and temperament".

In 1856, Alexander Cassatt entered Rensselaer Polytechnic Institute to study civil engineering. His senior thesis was entitled "Review of Pressure Turbine". After graduating in the summer of 1859, his father took him to see James Buchanan, the 15th president of the United States, who was a former neighbor of the family.

By the fall of 1860, Cassatt had secured a position as a surveyor or rodman with the Georgia Railroad. By the time the State of Georgia voted to secede from the Union in January 1861, Cassatt had abandoned his work as surveyor on the Dalton-Knoxville line of the Georgia Railroad and returned to Pennsylvania without seeing any military service during the American Civil War.

== Career ==
=== Pennsylvania Railroad ===
Alexander J. Cassatt (usually styled A. J. Cassatt) joined the Pennsylvania Railroad (PRR) in 1861 as an engineer and rapidly rose through the ranks. He was a vice president in 1877 when the Pittsburgh Railway riots broke out, and had become PRR's first vice-president by 1880. He was disappointed to be passed over for the presidency and resigned from the company in 1882.

During his absence he devoted his time to horse breeding but still was able to organize the New York, Philadelphia and Norfolk Railroad (NYP&N), a new line that connected southern markets with the north. Despite no longer being an executive with PRR, he was elected to the PRR's board of directors and was recalled in 1899 to serve as president.

Cassatt more than doubled the PRR's total assets during his term, from $276 million to $594 million, while track and equipment investment increased by almost 150 percent. The route from New York through Philadelphia, Harrisburg and Altoona to Pittsburgh was made double-tracked throughout; the route to Washington, D.C. made four-tracked (it was known as "Pennsy's Broad Way"). Many other lines were double-tracked; almost every part of the system was improved. New freight cutoffs avoided stations; grade crossings were eliminated; flyovers were built to streamline common paths through junctions; terminals were redesigned, and much more. Cassatt initiated the PRR's program of electrification which led to the road being the United States' most electrified system.

However the PPR's great accomplishment under Cassatt's stewardship was the planning and construction of the long awaited tunnels under the Hudson River that brought PRR's trunk line into New York City. His purchase of a controlling interest in the Long Island Rail Road and the construction of tunnels under the East River facilitated the creation of a PRR commuter network on Long Island.

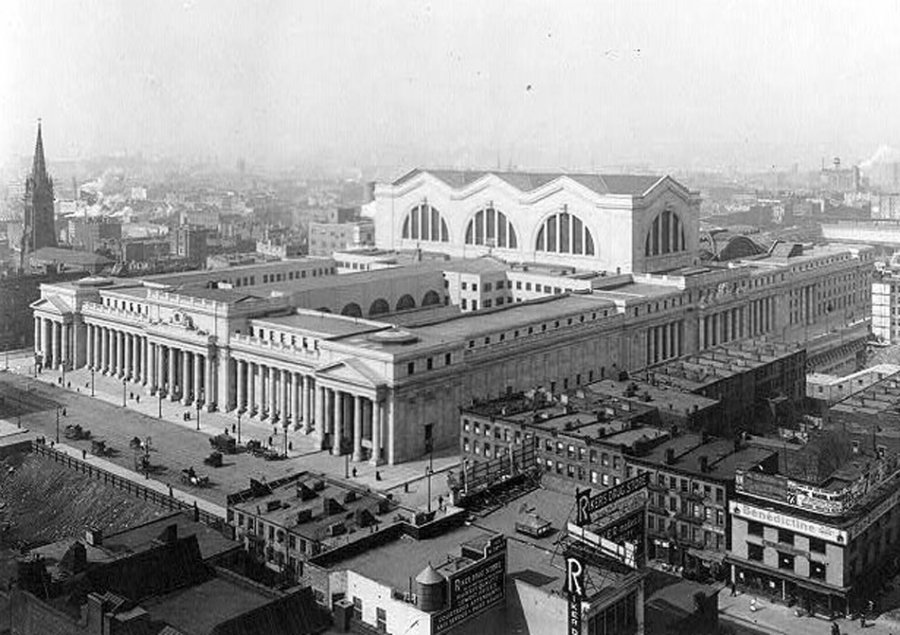
Pennsylvania Station, New York, NY (1911, demolished 1963).

Cassatt died in 1906, several years before his grand Pennsylvania Station in New York City was completed. He was succeeded as PRR's president by James McCrea.

=== Civil engineer ===
In the spring of 1861, Cassatt had been hired as part of the Engineer Corps of the Pennsylvania Railroad, again as a rodman where he worked on the Connecting Railway.

It is unknown how Cassatt managed to avoid the Pennsylvania militia draft during the Union mobilization in this period but in 1864, Cassatt was transferred to Renovo, Pennsylvania, as a resident engineer to work on the middle division of the Philadelphia and Erie railroad. In 1866, Cassatt became superintendent of motive power and machinery for the Oil Creek and Allegheny River Railway, recently reorganized in 1864 as the Warren and Franklin Railroad which was growing rapidly due to the discovery of oil in the region and coal mining.

In 1867, Cassatt was appointed as superintendent of motive power and machinery for the Pennsylvania railroad in Altoona with a salary of $3,000 per year ($_{2025}=69,000) when a trainman made less than $10 a week ($_{2025}=200).

Sometime during Cassatt's tenure as superintendent, he married Lois Buchanan, daughter of the Rev. Edward Y. Buchanan and Ann Eliza Foster. Lois Buchanan was a niece of James Buchanan, 15th President of the United States, and through her mother, a niece of songwriter Stephen Foster. The couple had two sons and two daughters.

In 1872, Cassatt was elected as a member to the American Philosophical Society.

=== Chesterbrook Farm ===
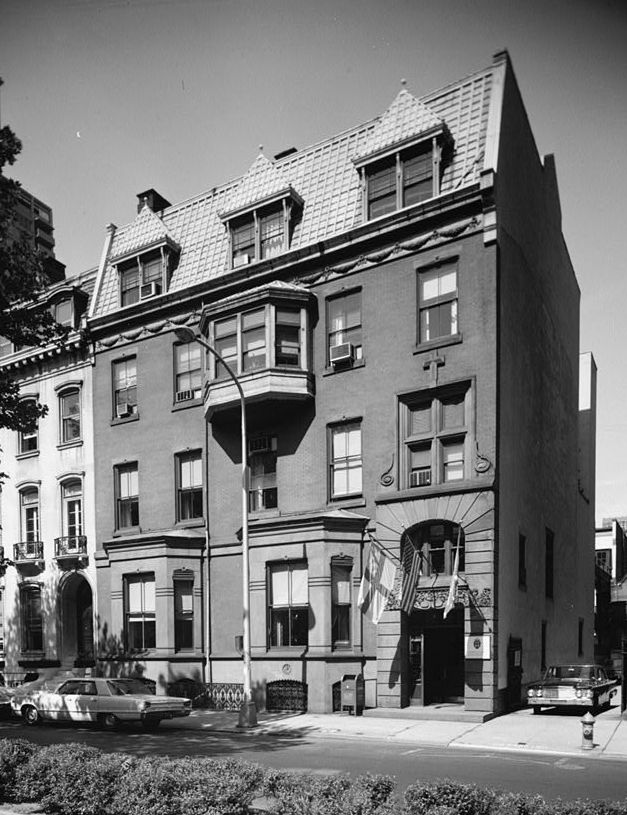
Cassatt's Rittenhouse Square townhouse at 202 South 19th Street, Philadelphia, Pennsylvania, (demolished 1972). Now the site of the Rittenhouse Hotel.

Cassatt was a horse enthusiast and fox hunter who owned Chesterbrook Farm, outside Berwyn, Pennsylvania, where he bred Thoroughbred racehorses. The 600-acre (240 ha) property is today the site of a subdivision with office buildings and homes using the Chesterbrook Farm name. The original main barn designed by Philadelphia architect Frank Furness has been maintained and restored. (Furness also designed Cassatt's Rittenhouse Square townhouse.)

Cassatt initially raced under the pseudonym "Mr. Kelso" and his horses as from the Kelso Stable. He owned the 1886 Preakness Stakes winner, The Bard, and the 1889 Belmont Stakes 1889 winner, Eric. As well, he bred the winner of the 1875, 1876, 1878, and 1880 Preakness Stakes and Foxford, who won the 1891 Belmont.

In addition to flat-racing his Thoroughbreds, in 1895 Cassatt helped found the National Steeplechase Association to organize competitive steeplechase racing. He was also responsible for the introduction of the Hackney pony to the United States. In 1878 he acquired 239 Stella in Britain and brought her to Philadelphia. In 1891, Cassatt and several fellow Hackney enthusiasts founded the American Hackney Horse Society. The organization and registry continues to this day, with its headquarters now in Lexington, Kentucky.

== Death and interment ==
Cassatt had been feeling unwell since early August 1906, while he was vacationing with his family in Bar Harbor, Maine. There, he had contracted whooping cough from his two grandchildren, Cassatt and Catherine Stewart. His condition became serious, and specialists were called to examine him. He seemed to have recovered by the middle of September.

Cassatt's physician, Dr. J.H. Musser, had diagnosed him with Adams-Stokes syndrome, a form of temporary hypoxia, and from early December onwards, he was attended regularly by a nurse. His family and friends were often worried about his health, but Cassatt protested that he would soon recover. On Christmas Eve, Cassatt went for a drive and returned insisting that he felt much refreshed, though Musser had his doubts.

On the morning of December 28, a Friday, Cassatt did not feel well and decided to return to bed, though he did not complain to his wife and daughter, who were with him, of any particular pain. He was supposedly cheerful and decided to forgo his usual business meetings with other officials of the Pennsylvania Railroad, who had been coming to his residence on Rittenhouse Square regularly to meet him for much of December, so they did not seem alarmed. His grandchildren visited him before scampering away to the playroom in the Cassatt townhouse. A short time later Cassatt fell asleep, and it was only a short time later that Cassatt's wife noticed he looked very pallid, and summoned the nurse, whose examination quickly determined he was dead. Dr. Musser was summoned, but he also determined that no medical aid would be useful.

Despite the medical explanations for Cassatt's passing, many of his business colleagues in the railroad and financial industries immediately asserted that he had died "of a broken heart due to the sensational revelations of grafting by officials of the Pennsylvania [Railroad] system" that had come to light during recent investigations into the coal industry by the Interstate Commerce Commission.

A servant called both Musser and Cassatt's assistant William A. Patton to inform them of his death. The news was then relayed to the employees of the Pennsylvania Station at Broad Street Station in Philadelphia and from there telegraphed throughout the United States.

He was interred in the Church of the Redeemer Cemetery in Bryn Mawr, Pennsylvania. His widow died in 1920.

== Legacy ==
In World War II, the United States Liberty ship SS A. J. Cassatt was named in his honor.

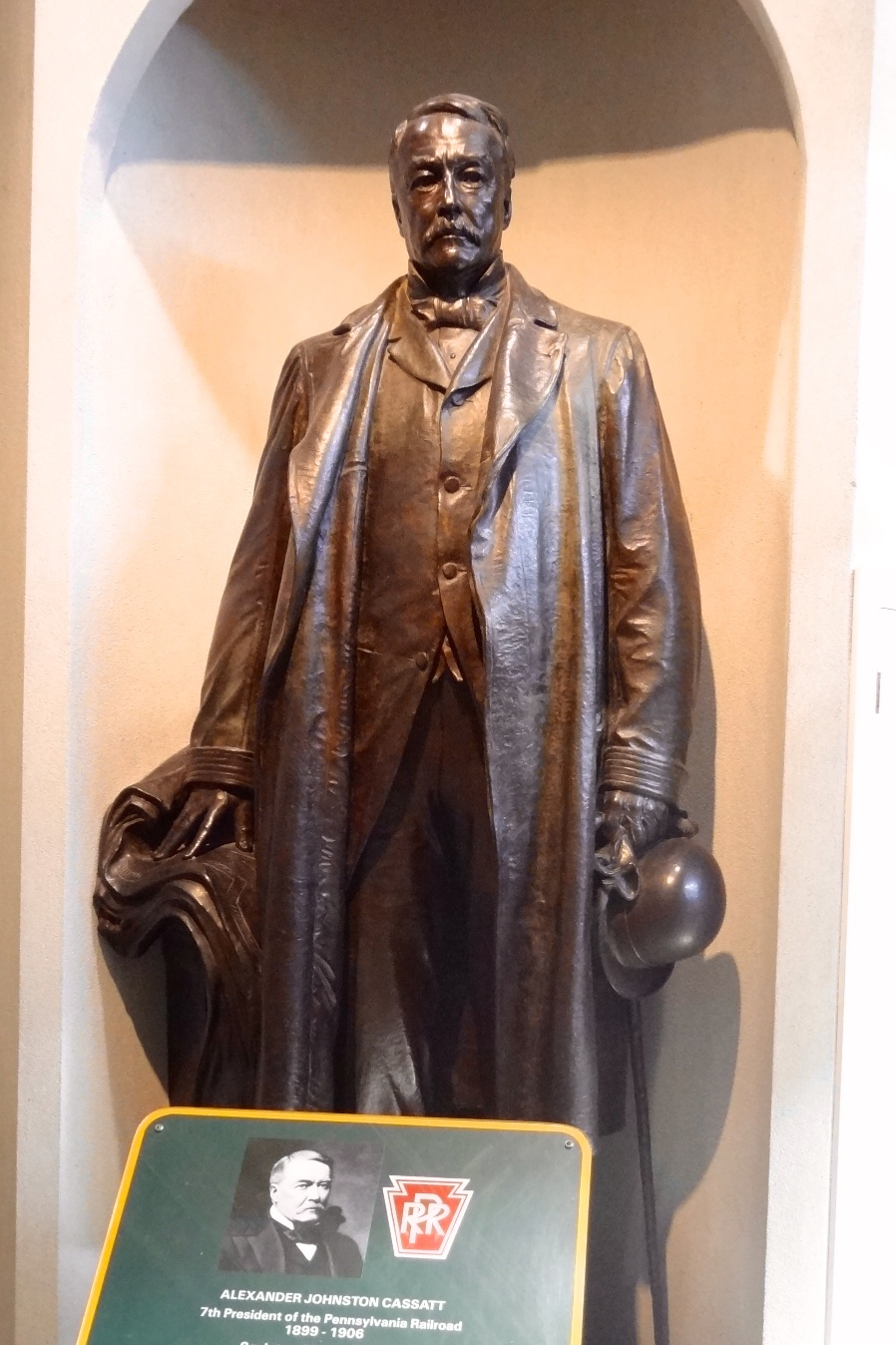
His statue at the Railroad Museum of Pennsylvania

Gramercy Mansion in Baltimore, Maryland, was built by Alexander Cassatt in 1902.

The New York Times reported that Cassatt was, relative to other railroad magnates, not an extraordinarily wealthy man, citing officials at the Pennsylvania Railroad who stated at his death that he was worth no more than $5 million (though this would at least be equivalent to $173.9 million in 2022). Evidently, Cassatt built most of his fortune between 1882 and 1899, when he was no longer employed by the Pennsylvania Railroad, as he had invested in stock of railroad supply manufacturers such as the Union Switch and Signal Company and the United States Metallic Packing Company, the Pennsylvania Steel Company, and the Cambria Steel Company.

In 1910, the Pennsylvania Railroad erected a statue of Cassatt, by Adolph Alexander Weinman, in a niche at New York City's new Pennsylvania Station. An inscription below the niche read:

ALEXANDER JOHNSTON CASSATT · president pennsylvania railroad company · 1899–1906 · whose foresight, courage and ability achieved · the extension of the pennsylvania railroad system · into new york city

The statue is currently located at the Railroad Museum of Pennsylvania in Strasburg, Pennsylvania.

== See also ==
- Pennsylvania Station – original station, demolished in 1963
- List of railroad executives

Preceded by Frank Thomson	President of Pennsylvania Railroad; 1899–1906	Succeeded by James McCrea
