= 2006 in rail transport =

This article lists events related to rail transport that occurred in 2006.

== Events ==
=== January events ===
- (India) January – New Kolkata railway station for long-distance passengers officially inaugurated in Chitpur.
- January 5 – Railway workers across India begin voting on whether or not to hold a strike against Indian Railways in February. The union's demands center around pay scales, pensions, and private investment into the railway. A Northern Railway Mazdoor Union spokesperson stated that the decision to hold the strike vote was made at the recent All India Railwaymen's Union convention in Mumbai; Western Railway Mazdoor Sangh union members protested at the convention by burning an effigy of Indian Finance Minister P Chidambaram. Voting is scheduled to conclude on January 8, and the vote count, which is expected to begin on January 9, will be monitored by external observers.
- January 6 – China's Minister of Railways Liu Zhijun announces details of a 160 billion yuan ($20 billion) plan for railway construction there in the coming year. The ministry expects to begin construction on as many as 87 new railway projects in 2006, including thirteen new express passenger train routes and opening new electrified lines. The plan also includes the acceleration of eleven express passenger route projects already under construction.

=== February events ===
- February 7 – Workers in Turkmenistan begin the final phase of construction on the Trans Karakum railway that will connect Ashgabat to Dashoguz, crossing the Karakum Desert. The new railway connection is expected to cut travel times between the two cities in half, bypassing the current circuitous route from Ashgabat through Mary and Lebap provinces and along the border with Uzbekistan. Once construction is completed, the official opening ceremony is expected to be held at the new Ichoguz station on the border between Ahal and Dashhowuz provinces.
- February 13 – Genesee & Wyoming (G&W) announces that it has sold its 50% share in operations (the other 50% was owned by Wesfarmers) of the Australian Railroad Group (ARG) in Western Australia to Queensland Rail (QR) and Babcock & Brown (B&B). The deal, valued at $974 million (A$1.55 billion), splits the holdings between operations and infrastructure elements with QR purchasing the above-rail operations and B&B purchasing the below-rail infrastructure. In a concurrent deal, G&W is purchasing Wesfarmer's share of ARG in South Australia for $15 million (A$22 million), which is renamed Genesee & Wyoming Australia and operated as a subsidiary company of G&W.
- February 20 – Officials in Thailand affirm that they will consider World Heritage Railway status for the Thailand-Burma Railway, also known as the Death Railway. Thousands of British, Dutch and Australian nationals perished in the railway's prisoner of war construction camps during World War II, and the railway's construction served as the inspiration for the 1957 film The Bridge on the River Kwai. The campaign to gain heritage status is being led by Takashi Nagase, an English language teacher in Japan, who had served as an interpreter for the Japanese military during the war.

=== March events ===
- (United States) March – Guilford Rail System changes its name to Pan Am Railways.
- (South Korea) March 1 – South Korean railroad strike of 2006: Members of the Korean Railway Workers' Union begin a strike action against Korean National Railroad (Korail). Systemwide passenger service is reduced by 60% and freight service is also drastically reduced during the strike. Union members called the strike to protest Korail's practice of replacing regular long-term positions with short-term contract positions.
- (Republic of Ireland) March 9 – Groundbreaking ceremonies are held in Dublin, Ireland, on Spencer Station, the first new railway station to be built in the city in more than 100 years. The first shovelfuls of dirt were turned by Minister for Transport Martin Cullen. The new station, which is valued at €30 million, will serve the Maynooth and Navan lines and is planned as part of an extension of the city's Luas light rail system to the north docks area. The new station, part of the Transport 21 plan announced in 2005, is expected to open in mid-2007.
- March 24 – Officials with the Portuguese firm Mota-Engil announce that the company will begin building a trans-Andean railway line in April 2006 that will connect Argentina and Chile. Construction of the new Transandino del Sur railway will begin near the Argentine city of Zapala and will run from there for the 50 km (31 mi) to the Chilean border; Mota-Engil expects to complete this section by 2008. From the border, the contract to build the segment to the Chilean city of Lonquimay, 170 km (110 mi) further, will be up for international bidding.
- (Japan) March 27 – Second phase of the Kintetsu Keihanna Line opens for service between Ikoma Station and Gakken Nara-Tomigaoka Station, bringing railway service further into Kansai Science City.

=== April events ===
- (United Kingdom) April 1 – The London passenger rail services of West Anglia Great Northern and Thameslink are merged under First Capital Connect in a new franchise that will continue for six years. The new franchisee plans to overhaul the trains with new liveries and on-board services as well as an £8 million program of upgrades for several major stations.
- April 7 – Officials with BNSF Railway announce that the railway will become the first United States railroad to open an office in China when its office in Shanghai opens later in April. Both Canadian National Railway and Canadian Pacific Railway, which both maintain track and operate in the US, already maintain offices in China, but this will be the first office for a US-headquartered railway. The office is hoped to help BNSF with logistics planning for containerized shipments between the US and Asia.
- April 10–14 – Conference of African Railway Ministers discusses integration and gauge standardisation.
- April 11 – Hong Kong's Executive Council formally approves the merger of Kowloon-Canton Railway (KCR) and Mass Transit Railway (MTR). Officials close to the negotiations estimate a passenger fare reduction for as many as 2.8 million riders on the first day that the merger is effective. The proposal includes a formula for future fare adjustments. The resulting company will use the MTR name and identity; it will be responsible for the daily operation of both KCR and MTR systems. Although up to 700 layoffs are predicted due to job duplication, officials estimate that the combined company could be looking to hire 1,300 more employees within a few years.
- (Switzerland) April 24 – Bern–Lötschberg–Simplon railway merges with Regionalverkehr Mittelland to form the new BLS AG, operating primarily in the Swiss Canton of Bern.
- April 25 – Officials with the governments of Spain and the Basque autonomous region sign an agreement outlining the proposed Basque Y railway service. The service would provide passenger and freight rail transport between the three Basque provincial capitals of Vitoria-Gasteiz, Bilbao and San Sebastián and connections to the high-speed Madrid–Vitoria-Gasteiz–Paris rail corridor. The agreement puts the section between Vitoria-Gasteiz and Bilbao under Spanish control, and the section in Gipuzkoa province under Basque control.

=== May events ===
- (China) May 9 – The last train from Beijing South railway station departed at 23:09, and the station then stops services for preparing the rebuild. The new Beijing south will be the starting station of high-speed trains include Beijing-Tianjin high-speed rail and Beijing-Shanghai Express Railway. The rebuild work is scheduled to be completed in 2008.
- May 11 – Transport and Communications Minister of Greece, Mihalis Liapis, announces a €2 billion pledge by the government to rehabilitate the country's rail network. One of the projects included in the pledge is an expansion of passenger rail service between Athens and Thessaloniki. OSE, the national railway of Greece, is expected to submit orders for new equipment valued at over €750 million in the following week.
- (Germany) May 13 – Inauguration of Nuremberg–Munich high-speed railway.
- (United States) May 16 – In ceremonies held in Washington, D.C., the 2005 E. H. Harriman Awards for employee safety on American railroads are presented. Recipients in class A (line-haul railroad companies with more than 15 million employee hours per year) are: Gold – Norfolk Southern Railway (for the 17th consecutive year); Silver – BNSF Railway; and Bronze – CSX Transportation. In class B (between 4 and 15 million employee hours per year), the recipients are: Gold – Canadian Pacific's U.S. subsidiary (formerly Soo Line Railroad); Silver – Kansas City Southern Railway; and Bronze – Metra. In class C (less than 4 million employee hours per year), the recipients are: Gold – Florida East Coast Railway; Silver – Pan Am Railways; Bronze – Elgin, Joliet and Eastern Railroad. The final group, switching and terminal railroads, recipients are: Gold – Terminal Railroad Association of St. Louis; Silver – Conrail; Bronze – Belt Railway of Chicago.

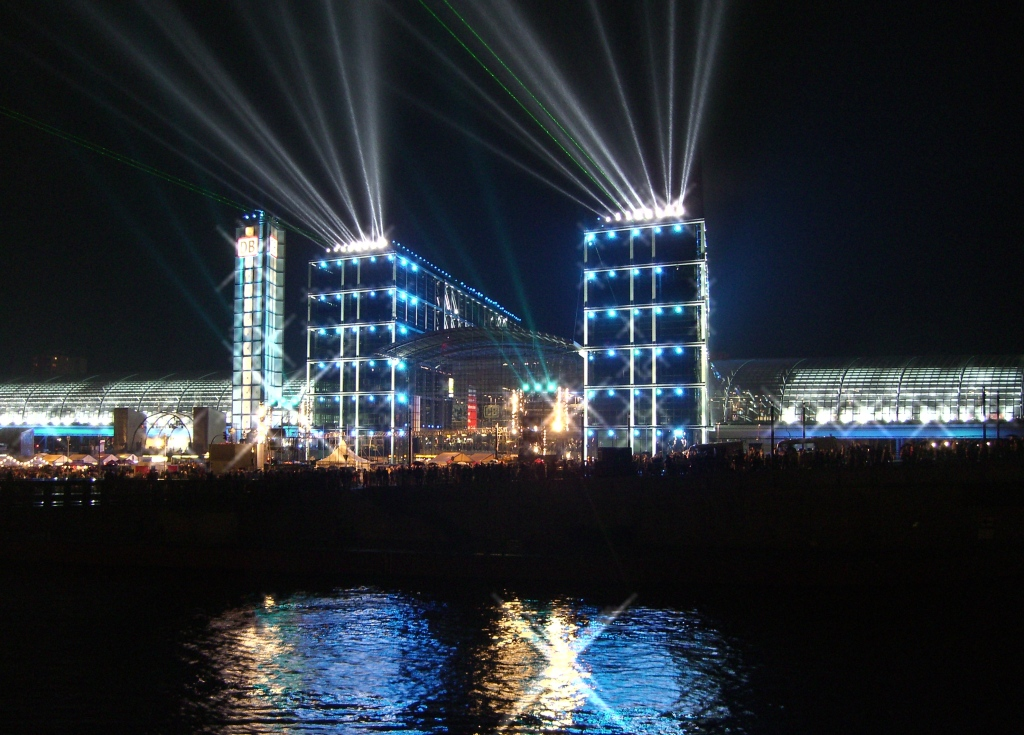
Opening celebration for Berlin Hauptbahnhof

- May 22 – Mark 4 InterCity Coaches enter service in the Republic of Ireland.
- (Germany) May 26 – Berlin Hauptbahnhof is ceremonially opened by Chancellor Angela Merkel, who arrives together with transport minister Wolfgang Tiefensee in a specially chartered InterCityExpress from Leipzig. A "Symphony of Light" is performed immediately following the dedication. Reamonn and BAP perform at Hauptbahnhof, and there are also events at the other new stations: Gesundbrunnen, Potsdamer Platz and Südkreuz. Full public operation begins 2 days later.

=== June events ===
- (United Kingdom) – Fastline Freight begins revenue operation.
- (India) June 5 – Indian Railways begins construction on a new rail bridge that will become the highest railroad bridge in the world. The bridge, crossing the Chenab River at 359 metres (1,178 ft) above the river and connecting Katra and Laol in the Indian state of Jammu and Kashmir, will also include the world's largest supporting arch. The arch will span 1,315 m (4,314 ft). Construction is expected to be completed by 2009.
- June 6 – In a precedent-setting case brought by European Green Party legislator Alain Lipietz and his sister, SNCF, the national railway of France, is ordered to pay almost $80,000 in reparations for transporting members of their family to the Drancy deportation camp during World War II. SNCF argued at trial that they were at the time under orders of the German military; the railroad further argued that the German military threatened to shoot any railroad official who disobeyed their orders. The court disagreed with SNCF concluding that there was no way that SNCF could have avoided knowledge of the prisoners' likely deportation to concentration camps and that SNCF made no effort to either protest the transportation or to transport them in a humane manner.
- June 20 – Hankyu Railway announces that it has completed its stock purchase for control of Hanshin Electric Railway in a transaction totalling about $2.2 billion. Hankyu now owns a 63.7% interest in Hanshin, which is planned to be operated as a subsidiary company beginning later in 2006. The purchase makes the combined company the third largest railway in Japan by revenue, and the second largest in the Kansai region.
- (China) June 26 – Shanghai South railway station opens for limited service; the first regular train out of the station is train N521 bound for Hangzhou. The station features the world's largest circular transparent roof and can accommodate up to 16,000 passengers at once. Formal opening ceremonies are currently scheduled for July 1.

=== July events ===
- July 1 – China's President Hu Jintao presides over a ribbon cutting ceremony in Golmud to officially open the Qingzang railway for service. The first train over the newly constructed line carried about 900 passengers to Lhasa. With the highest point on the new line at 5,072 m (16,640 ft) above sea level, the Qingzang railway is now the highest operating railway in the world.
- (France) July 2 – SNCF's president Louis Gallois leaves the French railway company for Airbus. He's been replaced by Anne-Marie Idrac, former president of the RATP. Louis Gallois had been SNCF's president for 10 years, and SNCF's employees applauded him as he was leaving.

=== August events ===
- August 3 – The power car of the first RUS 250/330 high speed trainset built by Siemens is delivered in a ceremony at Saint Petersburg, Russia. A total of six 10-car trains are being built by Siemens for use between Saint Petersburg and Moscow; in service, the trains are expected to reach speeds up to 250 km/h (155 mph) and are designed for speeds as fast as 300 km/h (186 mph). Although current trackage between the two cities could not currently support such speeds, a Russian Siemens official stated that construction is underway to upgrade existing track and build new track.
- August 10 – Officials in China announce plans to extend the Qingzang railway beyond Lhasa to Tibet's second-largest city, Xigaze, which would add another 170 miles (270 km) of track to the already controversial line. Chinese officials anticipate the extension to be completed in 2009.
- (United States) August 29 – Amtrak announces the selection of Alexander Kummant to become president and CEO of the company effective September 12 to succeed David L. Gunn. David Hughes, who had stepped in as interim president, will step down from that position but will remain with the company. Before Amtrak, Kummant had served as a vice president for Komatsu America Corporation and as a Regional Vice President for Union Pacific Railroad.

=== September events ===
- (Finland) 1 September – Helsinki-Lahti railway opens. Finnish Railways start 220 km/h operations.
- September – The new federal railway agency of Finland will begin work.

=== October events ===
- October 15 – Venezuelan President Hugo Chávez presides over the opening ceremonies for the first new above-ground train line constructed in Venezuela for more than 70 years, the Ezequiel Zamora Mass Transportation System.

=== November events ===
- November 3 – Los Teques Metro Line 1, Ayacucho to Ali Primera route, officially regular operation service to start and first section in Altos Mirandinos, Venezuela.

=== December events ===
- December 24 – Opening of Imazatosuji ("orange") Line of Osaka Municipal Subway, Japan, using 80 series linear motor units.
- (China) December 30 – Guangzhou Metro's Line 4 extension from Xinzao to Huangge (except Guanqiao, Qingsheng) opens.

=== By season ===
==== Spring events ====
- (United States) Spring – The first test runs are scheduled to take place on a one-mile segment of the new light rail transit system in Phoenix, Arizona.

=== Unknown date events ===
- (United States) – The Massachusetts Bay Transportation Authority expects to switch from tokens to a farecard system that will be called "The Charlie Card" in honor of the unfortunate hero of "Charley on the MTA" (a.k.a. "M.T.A.").
- (Canada) – GO Transit in Toronto, plans to begin construction to add a third track on the Lakeshore West and Lakeshore East lines and a second track on the Georgetown line.
- (United States) – Union Pacific Railroad and CSX Transportation will launch new produce unit trains between Washington and New York states.
- – Vietnam expects to begin construction to upgrade the Hanoi–Lào Cai railway line.
- (United States) – The Deadwood, Black Hills and Western Railroad expects to begin passenger train service between Rapid City, Piedmont, Sturgis, Whitewood and Deadwood, South Dakota.
- (United Kingdom) – Feasibility tests of airport-style security systems will be performed at London Paddington station as random passengers are asked to pass through detectors and have their bags X-ray scanned. The test period is expected to last about six months.
- (Canada) – Royal Hudson steam locomotive 2860 is expected to return to excursion service after its overhaul.

== Accidents ==
- January 23 – The Bioče train disaster in Montenegro kills at least 45 people, including five children, and injures another 184 injured. It is the worst train disaster in Montenegrin history.
- (United States) June 14 – Two BNSF Railway trains collide near Madera, California injuring all 4 crew members. The cause was drug driving by one of the engineers.
- July 3 – An accident on Valencia Metro kills at least 41 and injures 40. The driver seems to have driven too fast, causing the breaking of a wheel and the derailment of the train. This accident occurs in the very center of Valencia, Spain, as the city makes ready for Pope Benedict XVI's arrival July 8.
- July 11 – A series of bombs explode aboard commuter trains on the Mumbai Suburban Railway in India. An additional bomb is also found, but defused, at the Borivali station. The blasts claim at least 200 lives, and cause hundreds of injuries. The bombs explode during the evening rush hour on trains plying on the western line of the suburban train network, which forms the backbone of Mumbai's transportation network.
- August 21 – Qalyoub rail accident – A passenger train from Mansoura runs past a signal and crashes into a stopped passenger train in Qalyoub, Egypt, killing 57 and injuring 128 more. Four passenger cars derail in the accident which closes the line in the country's Nile Delta region. The train is estimated as travelling at more than 50 mph (80 km/h) at the time of the collision. In the wake of the accident, Egyptian Railways director Hanafi Abdel Qawi is dismissed.
- September 22 – 2006 Lathen maglev train accident – A Transrapid magnetic levitation (or "maglev") train collides with a maintenance vehicle near Lathen, Germany, killing 23 people. This is the first ever fatal accident on a maglev train.
- (United States) October 9 – A BNSF Railway coal train rear-ended a local train in a siding near Cactus, Texas injuring both crew members. The cause was a misaligned switch.
- (Italy) October, 17 - A train crash happened in Vittorio Emanuele station, on the line A's Rome metro, the injuries was 110 and the deaths was 1 (Alessandra Lisi)
- (United Kingdom) December 30 – Heavy rainfall causes a landslide on an embankment near St Blazey, Cornwall, blocking the Atlantic Coast Line.

== Deaths ==
=== February deaths ===
- (United States) February 5 – W. Thomas Rice, president of Richmond, Fredericksburg and Potomac Railroad 1955–1957, Atlantic Coast Line Railroad 1957–1967, Seaboard Coast Line Railroad, cofounder of CSX Transportation, dies (b. 1913).
- February 24 – Emery Gulash, prolific and widely published photographer of mid-20th century Midwestern United States railroading, dies (b. 1918).

=== April deaths ===
- (Canada) April 7 – Ian David Sinclair, president of Canadian Pacific Railway 1969–1981, dies (b. 1913).

=== June deaths ===
- (United States) June 5 – Edward L. Moyers, president of MidSouth Rail and Illinois Central Railroad, chairman and CEO of Southern Pacific Railroad, "Railroader of the Year" for 1995, dies (b. 1928).

=== September deaths ===
- (United Kingdom) September 12 – Chris Moyes, Chief Executive Officer for Go-Ahead Group 2005–2006 (b. 1949).

=== October deaths ===
- (Russia) October 8 – Vasilie V. Magdei, Chairman of Ulaanbaatar Railway 2004–2006.

== Industry awards ==
=== Japan ===
Awards presented by Japan Railfan Club

- 2006 Blue Ribbon Award: Odakyu Electric Railway 50000 series VSE EMU
- 2006 Laurel Prize:
  - Nagoya Railroad 2000 series μSky EMU
  - Aichi Rapid Transit 100 series Linimo
  - Hiroshima Electric Railway 5100 series Green Mover Max tramcar
  - Fukuoka City Transportation Bureau 3000 series EMU

=== North America ===
2006 E. H. Harriman Awards

Group	Gold medal	Silver medal	Bronze medal
A	(not yet announced)	(not yet announced)	(not yet announced)
B	(not yet announced)	(not yet announced)	(not yet announced)
C	(not yet announced)	(not yet announced)	(not yet announced)
S&T	(not yet announced)	(not yet announced)	(not yet announced)

Awards presented by Railway Age magazine

- 2006 Railroader of the Year: Richard F. Timmons (American Short Line and Regional Railroad Association)
- 2006 Regional Railroad of the Year: Buffalo and Pittsburgh Railroad
- 2006 Short Line Railroad of the Year: Georgia Midland Railroad

=== United Kingdom ===
Train Operator of the Year

- 2006: Midland Mainline
