= 1984 in rail transport =

This article lists events related to rail transport that occurred in 1984.

== Events ==
=== April events ===
- April 9
  - Saltaire station is reopened in West Yorkshire, England, by the West Yorkshire Passenger Transport Executive nearly twenty years after it was closed by British Rail.
  - Tokyu Den-en-toshi Line, Shibuya of Tokyo to Chuo-Rinkan route officially completed with regular operation service to start in Japan.
- April 15 – The first section of Pittsburgh Light Rail begins service after being upgraded from PCC streetcar operation.
- April 28 – Philadelphia's Center City Commuter Connection tunnel opens for service with shuttles between Suburban Station and Market East Station (now Jefferson Station).

=== May events ===
- May 20 - The Metrorail opens in Miami, Florida. There is free service from Dadeland South to Overtown/Arena to entice residents to ride.
- May 22 - Opening of Line 2 on the Seoul Metropolitan Subway (54.2 km (33.7 mi)).
- May 29 - Canadian Pacific Railway (CPR) operates the last train over the railroad's Waltham subdivision between Wyman and Waltham; power for this train is handled by road number 6538, the last CPR locomotive to wear the railroad's maroon and grey livery.

=== June events ===
- June 3 - Electrification is commissioned between Wyee and Newcastle allowing the introduction of electric interurban trains between Sydney and Newcastle and also the electric operation of freight services on this line.
- June 22 - Hundreds of stations in New Jersey are listed on the National Register of Historic Places, many of which are part of the recently formed New Jersey Transit Rail Operations.
- June 30 - The Minsk Metro in Belarus (then still a part of the Soviet Union) opens.

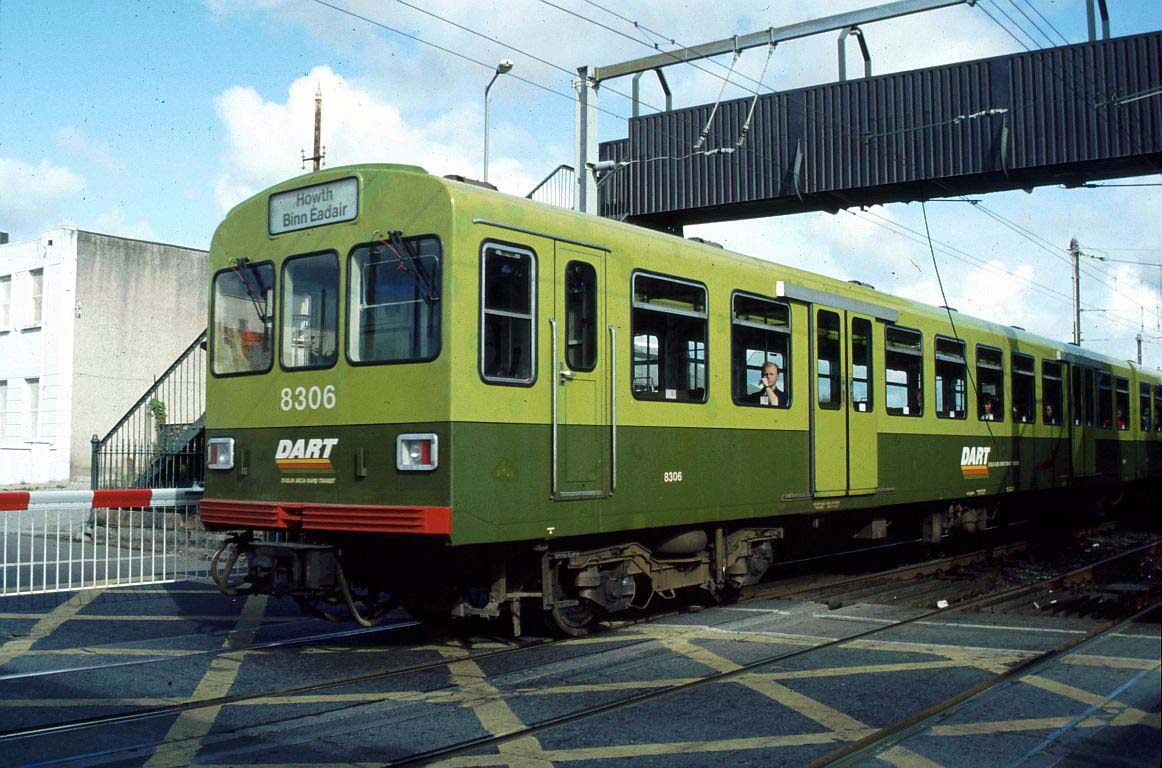
DART unit

=== July events ===
- July 23 - The Dublin Area Rapid Transit opens, serving Dublin with an electrified rapid transit service for commuters. The original route was from Howth to Bray.
- July 30 - The Polmont rail accident occurred at Polmont, near Falkirk, Scotland, when an express train from Edinburgh to Glasgow, travelling at high speed, struck a cow near Polmont station. Several of the carriages were derailed, resulting in 13 deaths and 61 injuries.

=== August events ===
- August 15 - The first empty revenue Chicago and North Western Railway coal train enters the Powder River Basin to pick up a trainload of coal; the first consignment is destined for Arkansas Power and Light.
- August 16 - The first full revenue Chicago and North Western Railway coal train leaves the Powder River Basin with a load from the North Antelope Mine.

=== September events ===
- September - Official ceremony at Kuanda to mark linking of eastern and western sections of Baikal Amur Mainline.
- September 3 - The final segment of the O'Hare rapid transit extension of the Chicago "L" between River Road and O'Hare International Airport opens for passenger service. After the completion of this extension, the CTA renamed the West-Northwest Route, the "O'Hare-Congress/Douglas" Line.

=== October events ===
- October 11 - The Wembley Central rail crash occurs just outside Wembley Central railway station, Greater London and kills three passengers.
- October 15 - The San Diego and Imperial Valley Railroad begins freight operations on the former San Diego and Arizona Eastern Railway right of way.
- October 24 - The first section of the Calcutta Metro (presently a section of Blue Line) begins operation in India.
- October 26 - The first Board of Directors of the newly formed Alaska Railroad, chaired by James Campbell, is appointed by Governor Bill Sheffield, and Frank Turpin is appointed company president.

=== November events ===
- November
  - Philadelphia: The last SEPTA passenger train departs from Reading Terminal on November 6, in preparation for the first train through the Center City Commuter Connection via Market East Station (now Jefferson Station) on November 12. Four days later, a serious defect on an old bridge at Temple U Station is discovered, leading to a shutdown of the newly opened connection until January 1985; permanent repairs are not completed until fall 1993.
  - Switzerland: Regionalverkehr Bern-Solothurn formed through merger.
- November 2 - The Iowa Interstate Railroad is created using the former Chicago, Rock Island and Pacific Railroad mainline from Chicago, Illinois, to Omaha, Nebraska.
- November 3 - Electrification between Kingston and Beenleigh in Brisbane is commissioned.

=== December events ===
- December 1 - The first rapid transit line in Southeast Asia and in the Philippines which is the Manila Line 1, began commercial operations from Baclaran Station up to Central Terminal Station
- December 4 - The Eccles rail crash occurred at Eccles, Greater Manchester, when an express passenger train collided at speed with the rear of a freight train, killing three people.
- December 20 - The Summit Tunnel fire occurred on a dangerous goods train passing through the Summit Tunnel on the Greater Manchester/West Yorkshire border in England.
- December 23 - Seventeen people were killed in the Train 904 bombing in the Apennine base tunnel in Italy. The attack is attributed to the Mafia.

=== Unknown date events ===
- Delaware and Hudson Railway is purchased by Guilford Transportation Industries.
- The Southern Pacific Company, parent of the Southern Pacific Railroad merges into Santa Fe Industries, parent of the Atchison, Topeka and Santa Fe Railway, to form Santa Fe Southern Pacific Corporation. When the Interstate Commerce Commission refuses permission for the planned merger of the railroad subsidiaries as the Southern Pacific Santa Fe Railroad SFSP shortens its name to Santa Fe Pacific Corporation and puts the SP railroad up for sale while retaining the non-rail assets of the Southern Pacific Company.
- Philip Anschutz purchases the Denver and Rio Grande Western Railroad.
- David L. Gunn assumes control of the New York City Transit Authority.
- Construction begins on the Buffalo Metro Rail system.
- Via Rail Canada restores service on the Super Continental passenger train.
- General Motors Electro-Motive Division introduces the EMD SD60.
- Keihin-Tohoku Line introduces Automatic Train Control.
- Operations on the PNR North Main Line was cut short to Paniqui, Tarlac after a bridge collapse. The Philippine National Railways' bus subsidiary also closed that year.
