= Rio Grande Industries =

Defunct railroad holding company

Rio Grande Holding, Inc.
- Formerly: Rio Grande Industries, Inc. (1968-1988)
- Industry: Railroad; Construction; Real estate; Energy
- Founded: 1968; 57 years ago
- Headquarters: Denver, Colorado, United States
- Parent: Anschutz Corporation (early 1980s-1988); Rio Grande Industries, Inc. (from 1988)

Southern Pacific Rail Corporation
- Formerly: Rio Grande Industries, Inc. (1988-1993)
- Founded: 1988; 37 years ago
- Parent: Union Pacific (from 2015)

Rio Grande Industries, Inc. (RGI) was a name of two holding companies that were involved in the railroading industry. The original and second company took part in the operations of the Denver and Rio Grande Western Railroad and the Southern Pacific Transportation Company.

The first company was formed in 1968 and was later known as Rio Grande Holding while the second company was formed in 1988 and was later known as Southern Pacific Rail Corporation.

== History ==
The original Rio Grande Industries was formed in 1968, its non-railroad operations included construction, real estate, and energy units. The original diversified parent company of the Denver and Rio Grande Western Railroad was headquartered in Denver.

In the early 1980s, after Philip Anschutz's Anschutz Corporation took RGI over and operated RGI as a subsidiary, they arranged the take over of the Southern Pacific Transportation Company, where new head Robert Krebs (of the SPTC's old parent Santa Fe Southern Pacific Corporation) had recently succeeded Benjamin Biaggini. When the Interstate Commerce Commission denied permission to merge the respective companies' railroad subsidiaries as the Southern Pacific Santa Fe Railroad, the merged holding company, which retained both companies' non-rail interests, while selling the Southern Pacific Transportation Company to Rio Grande Industries.

The original Rio Grande Industries changed its name to Rio Grande Holding (or Rio Grande Holding, Inc.) in 1988 and a new Rio Grande Industries company was formed in 1988; the new Rio Grande Industries took control of the original Rio Grande Industries (now known as Rio Grande Holding).

The Denver and Rio Grande Western was placed under control of the original Rio Grande Industries company (Rio Grande Holding) and the new Rio Grande Industries formed SPTC Holding (or SPTC Holding, Inc.) to purchase the Southern Pacific Transportation Company. The new Rio Grande Industries purchased the Southern Pacific Transportation Company and its subsidiaries under SPTC Holding subsidiary.

The new Rio Grande Industries company was renamed to the Southern Pacific Rail Corporation in 1993 and merged SPTC Holding into themselves.

The new Rio Grande Industries company, now known as the Southern Pacific Rail Corporation, was eventually merged into the Union Pacific in 2015.

According to the Utah corporation database, it has been suggested that the Southern Pacific Rail Corporation (formerly the second Rio Grande Industries) was merged into UP Holding Company, a Union Pacific subsidiary, and UP Holding Company was renamed Southern Pacific Rail Corporation, becoming a second incarnation of the Southern Pacific Rail Corporation. It has also been suggested that UP Holdings Company was originally known as "CNW Holdings" (or "CNW Holdings, Inc."). CNW Holdings could be mistaken for the Chicago and North Western Holdings Corporation, the former parent company of the Chicago and North Western.

Subsidiary companies in RGI history:

- Denver and Rio Grande Western Railroad
- Southern Pacific Transportation Company
- St. Louis Southwestern Railway
- Alton and Southern Railway
- SPCSL Corporation
- Leavell Development Company
- Rio Grande Motorways
- Frontier Village Amusement Park, San Jose CA (1976–1980)
- SPTC Holding (or SPTC Holding, Inc.)
- Rio Grande Holding II (or Rio Grande Holding II, Inc.)
- Arrow Development(1971–1981)
