= QSST election =

United States' tax law term

In United States federal income tax law, a qualified Subchapter S trust is one of several types of trusts that may retain ownership as the shareholder of an S corporation. The beneficiary of such a trust makes a QSST election for each S corporation in which the trust holds stock. A trust is eligible to hold S corporation stock if it is a Subpart E trust ("grantor trust"), a testamentary trust, a voting trust, a qualified Subchapter S trust ("QSST"), or an electing small business trust ("ESBT").
