= Ozol =

Ozol can refer to:

- The ozol, a fictional unit of currency in the works of Jack Vance
- Ozol (Contra Costa County), California, the location of the Defense Logistics Agency's Defense Fuel Support Point Ozol
