= Emsland test facility =

Former testing facility in Germany

Coordinates: 52°52′18″N 7°20′58″E

Emsland Test Facility
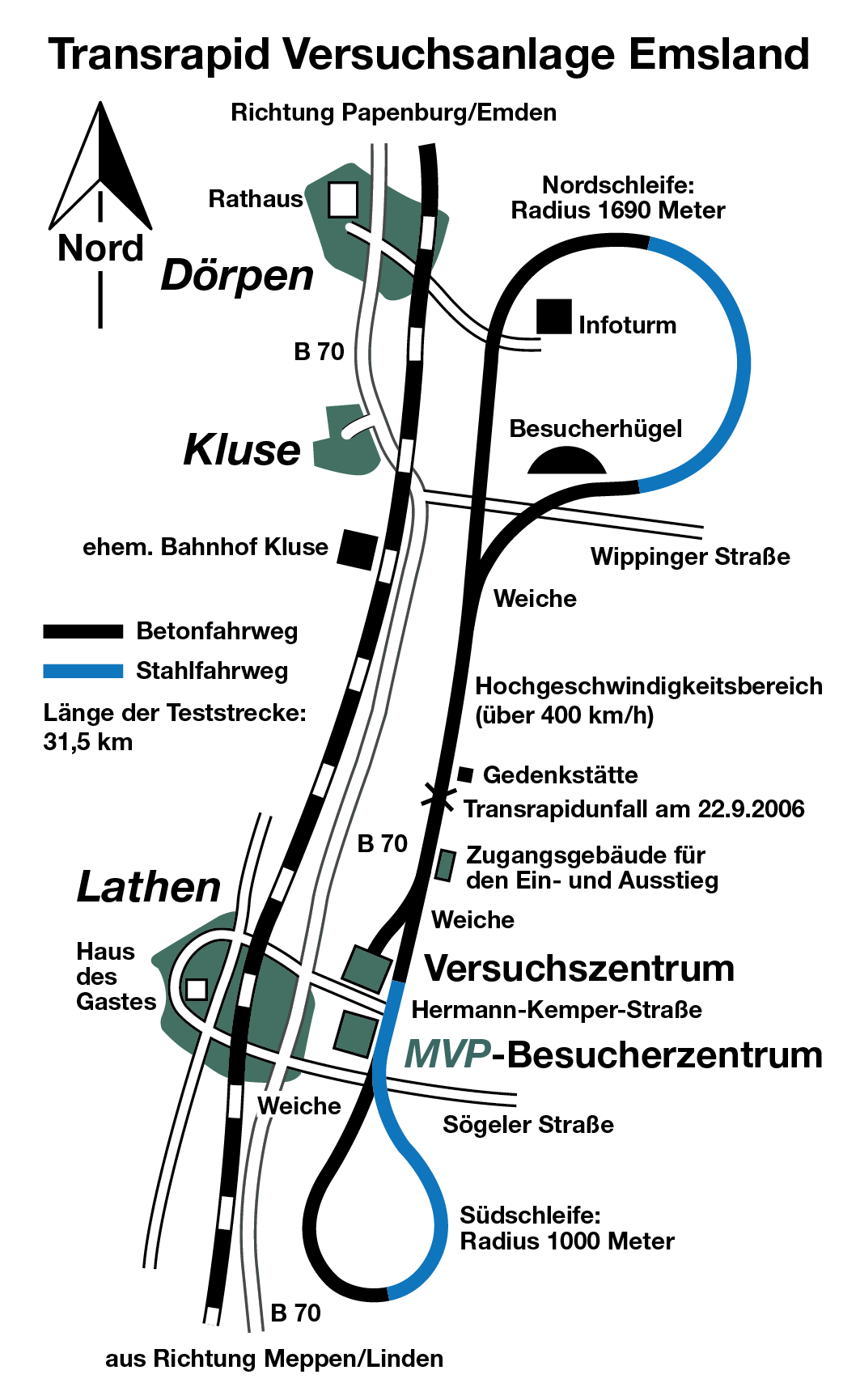

Overview
- Locale: Emsland, Germany
- Transit type: Maglev
- Number of lines: 1
- Number of stations: 1

Operation
- Began operation: 1984
- Ended operation: 2012
- Operator: Transrapid International

Technical
- System length: 31.5 kilometres

The Emsland Transrapid Test Facility (German: Transrapid-Versuchsanlage Emsland, TVE) is a defunct testing site for Transrapid maglev trains in Emsland in the west of Lower Saxony, Germany.

== Construction and use ==
Construction of the facility began in 1980 and was completed in 1984.

The single track line runs between Dörpen and Lathen. Turning loops are at each end. The track is elevated for almost its entire length to allow continued farming and grazing of the land occupied.

Until 2006, trains often carried paying passengers, possibly to "show off" the maglev. They regularly ran at up to 420 km/h. All runs, including those with passengers, were fully monitored, with the last car in the three car trains filled with monitoring computers and engineers.

== Accident ==
In 2006, 23 people were killed in the Lathen maglev train accident on the track, involving a Transrapid passenger train and a maintenance vehicle. The accident was discovered to have been caused by human failure in implementing safety and checking protocols.

== Closure ==
At the end of 2011, the operation license expired and the test track was closed.

In early 2012, the demolition and reconversion of all the Emsland site, including the tracks and factory, was approved.

Demolition work began around 2016, largely focused on stripping out the electrical equipment. As of 2024, none of the concrete structures have been demolished.

Transrapid 09, the last test train, was bought in 2016 by H. Kemper GmbH & Co. KG, a sausage factory, and is now in use as a meeting and memorial space on the factory site in Nortrup. One of the members of the Kemper family, Hermann Kemper, invented the technic of magnetic levitation.

In April 2024, updated drone footage revealed that although the electrical components of the Transrapid test track had been removed, the full 31.5 km of concrete infrastructure remained intact. In the same year, a local association reopened the former visitor center, offering exhibitions and access to preserved Transrapid vehicles.

== Potential reprieve ==
In 2021, IABG, which is responsible for the former test track, confirmed that it had been approached by CRRC about re-opening the site for use in testing CRRC's new maglev vehicles. At the same time, several universities from Lower Saxony confirmed they would consider reactivating the track to further develop the Hyperloop technology.
