= Alexander Kummant =

American business executive

Alexander K. Kummant (born 1962) was the president and chief executive officer of Amtrak from 2006 to 2008.

== Early life and education ==
Alexander K. Kummant was born in 1962 in Ohio. He earned his undergraduate degree from Case Western Reserve University's engineering school in 1982. He later earned a masters degree from Carnegie Mellon University in 1986 and an MBA from Stanford University in 1990.

== Career ==
Kummant began his career in railroad at 18 years old as a track crew member for the Lake Terminal Railroad at the U.S. Steel Lorian Works in Lorian, Ohio. By 1982, he began to work as an engineer for the Standard Oil Company. He left the Standard Oil Company in 1986 to work for the Carnegie Group, and from 1990 to 1992, Kummant served as a senior analyst for The Timken Company.

Following his departure from The Timken Company, Kummant served as a strategic planner for Emerson Electric in 1992. Four years later, he was named president of the SWECO Division at the company.

In 1998, Kummant was named a president of two SPX Technologies divisions.

The next year, Kummant joined the Union Pacific Railroad (UP). During his tenure, he served as a regional vice president, vice president and general manager of industrial products, and vice president of premium operations of the UP. He left the company in 2003.

In 2004, Kummant served as president of BOMAG, the German manufacturer of road rollers and other construction material compacting equipment. The next year, he was named executive vice president and chief marketing officer of Komatsu America Corporation.

In August 2006, Amtrak named Kummant president and chief executive officer, effective in September of that year. He succeeded David L. Gunn (who was dismissed in November 2005), and David Hughes who had been serving as interim president.

During his tenure, Kummanr reportedly opposed Congressional proposals to split the Northeast Corridor (the segment from Boston to Richmond) from the rest of Amtrak's operations and the cease of long distance east-west Amtrak routes of Amtrak.

Kummant submitted his resignation from Amtrak on November 14, 2008. His resignation received press coverage alleging that the departure was not voluntary, but instead due to a dispute with the board of directors regarding debt restructuring.

In October 2012, Kummant was recruited by QR National in Australia, becoming Executive Vice President Strategy.

== See also ==
- Amtrak

Business positions
| Preceded by David Hughes | President of Amtrak; 2006 – 2008 | Succeeded by William Crosbie (interim), Joseph H. Boardman |
