= Mueller Community =

Mueller
- Neighborhood
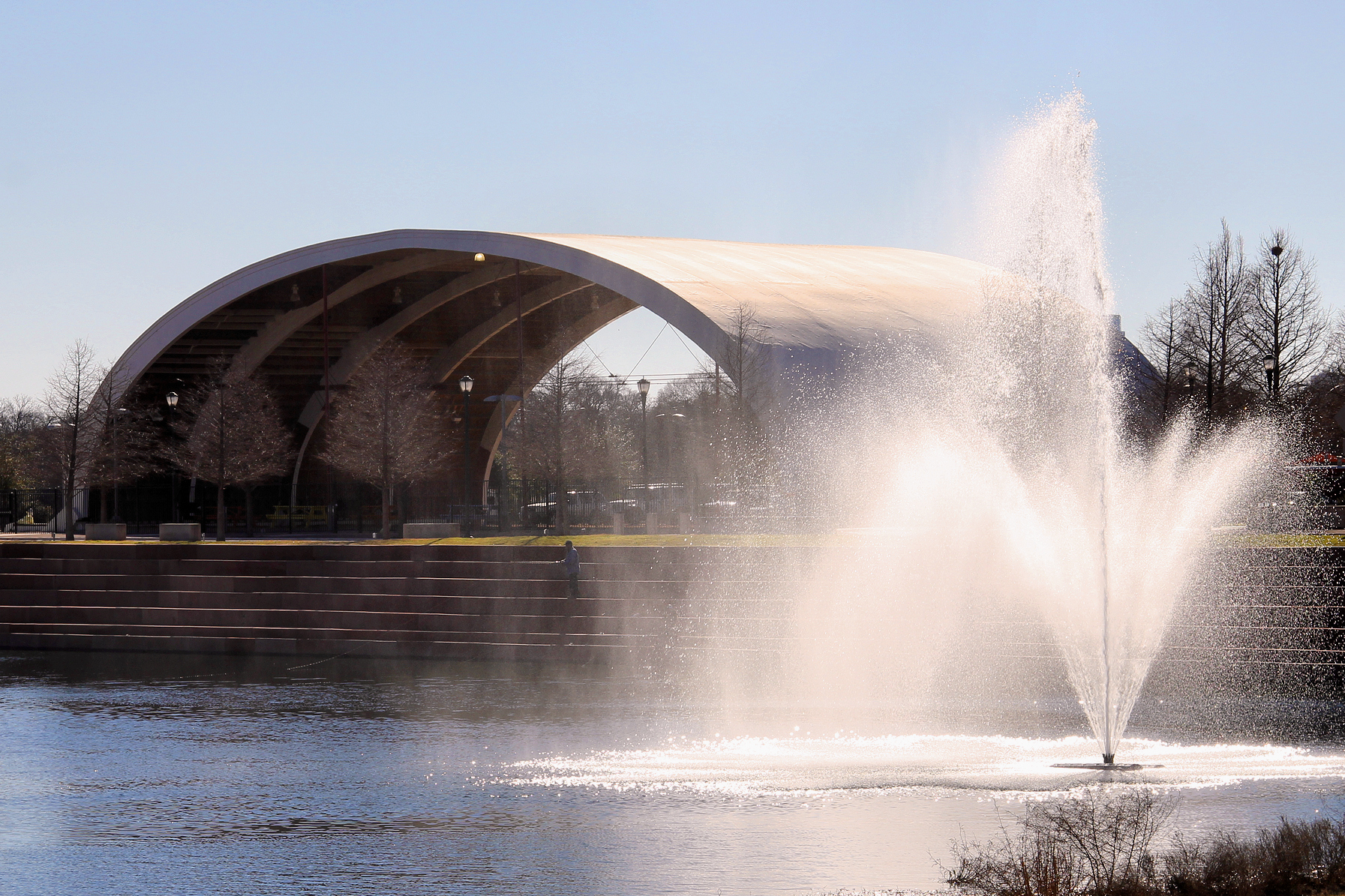
- Lake Park and converted Browning hangar in Mueller Community
- Neighborhood Boundaries
- Coordinates: 30°17′22″N 97°42′9.49″W
- Country: United States
- State: Texas
- City: Austin

Area
  - Total: 1.11094 sq mi (2.8773 km^{2})
- Time zone: UTC-6 (CST)
  - Summer (DST): UTC-5 (CDT)
- ZIP Codes: 78722 - 78723
- Area codes: 512, 737
- Website: http://www.muelleraustin.com

Mueller /ˈmɪlər/ is a 711-acre (288 ha) Planned Unit Development (PUD) in the east-central portion of the city of Austin, Texas, United States. The project is in the process of long-term development on the former site of the Robert Mueller Municipal Airport, which was closed in 1999 upon the opening of Austin–Bergstrom International Airport in southeast Austin, itself a civilian adaptation of Bergstrom Air Force Base after its closure in the early 1990s. Mueller is intended to be a pedestrian-oriented, interactive mixed-use community and a model for responsible urban planning and development.

== About ==
The community is being developed by Catellus, whose parent company was ProLogis. Per the developer, the value of the Mueller development upon completion will be $1.3 billion, and will comprise 4.2 million square feet of non-residential development, 650,000 square feet of retail space, 4,600 homes, and 140 acres of open space. An estimated 10,000 permanent jobs within the development will have been created by the time it is complete.

The Mueller Master Plan includes a mix of residential, commercial and retail developments, along with designated parks and green space, with many of the elements completed and many more in the planning stages. On Mueller's northwest edge, bordering I-35, the Mueller Retail Center has been completed, and is anchored by The Home Depot, Best Buy, Old Navy, and PetSmart. Adjacent to it is the Dell Children's Medical Center of Central Texas, a 32-acre campus with 248 patient beds and a total of 1,400 employees. In keeping with Mueller's best-practices ethos regarding environmentally friendly development, the Center is the first acute-care facility in the world to achieve LEED Platinum certification. Its 30-room Ronald McDonald House serves patients from both within the Dell facility as well as other children's hospitals in the region. The Center was expanded in 2011 to add a new patient wing.

To the Dell Center's immediate north, the 14-acre University of Texas Health Research Campus is under development. Its first building, the Dell Pediatric Research Institute, is already open, and next door a Residence Inn by Marriott is scheduled to open in early 2014. East of the Research Campus is a new Performing Arts Center designed to serve the entire Austin Independent School District. Upon completion in late 2014, it will incorporate a 1,200-seat auditorium as well as a 250-person capacity "black box theater." In Mueller's north-center area, at the intersection of East 51st St. and Berkman Drive, the Mueller Market District made its debut in mid-2013, anchored by a state-of-the-art H-E-B Grocery Store. The 83,000 square foot store was designed to consume a full 80% less electricity than a standard grocery store, as well as 50% less water, and H-E-B officials plan to seek LEED Silver Certification for the project. The store features Cafe Mueller, which includes a stage for band performances; dedicated stations for making guacamole and sushi on-site; two recharging stations for electric vehicles; and the only gas station in Central Austin that sells ethanol-based E85 car fuel.

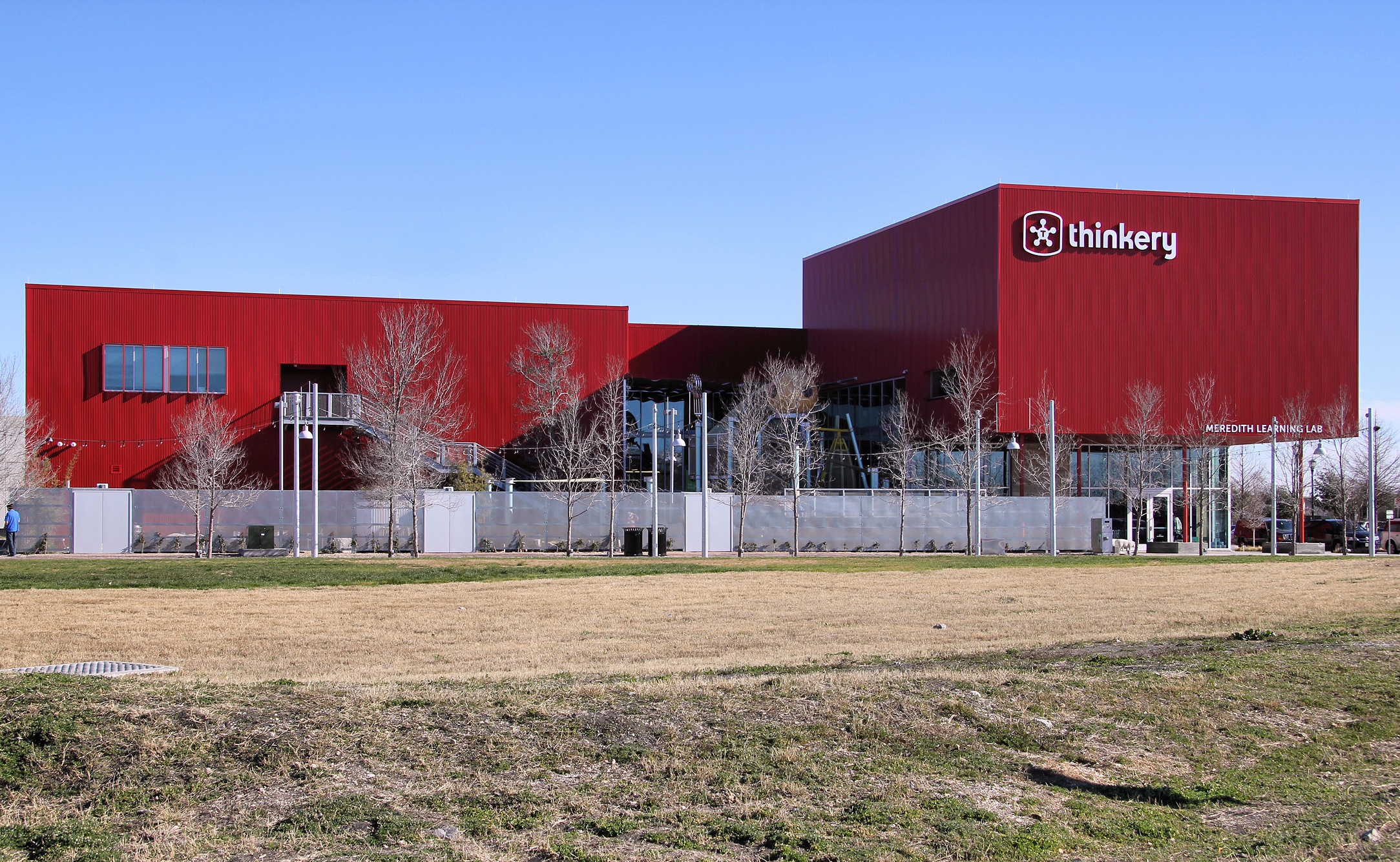
The Thinkery children's museum

A number of other facilities have been completed inside Mueller as well. The Austin Children's Museum—rebranded as The Thinkery—and Austin Playhouse were among the first tenants of the Mueller Town Center, and a 279-unit AMLI Residential apartment community is under construction next door. It will join two already completed luxury apartment complexes inside Mueller: Mosaic and Elements. Finally, Wildflower Terrace, an upscale apartment community, with 201 units, for seniors 65 and up, is open and located at Mueller's southern edge, near the intersection of Berkman Drive and Manor Road.

In December 2009, the U.S. Department of Energy awarded Pecan Street, Inc. $10.4 Million in federal stimulus funds to develop an advanced smart grid demonstration project at Mueller, which included a demonstration house—known as the Pike Powers Commercialization Lab—that made its debut in 2013.

Numerous eco-friendly green spaces have debuted in Mueller as well. At the center of it all is Lake Park, a 30-acre landscape featuring a duck-filled lake, hike and bike trails, and Browning Hangar, a historic airport hangar originally constructed in the 1940s and retroconverted into an open-air amphitheater. The Hangar is periodically used for special events and until 2021 housed Mueller's weekly Sunday Farmers' Market. Mueller's weekly Sunday Farmers' Market is now located at Branch Park Pavilion. Next door to the Hangar is Mueller Central, a former airport administration building that now houses an information center for Mueller as a whole. A block away from Mueller Central and Lake Park, Mueller's Northwest Greenway meanders its way along the area's border all the way to its termination point at I-35. South of Lake Park is the Southwest Greenway, where native plants and outdoor art installations share space with walking trails and water features. Here, Mueller officials have partnered with the Lady Bird Johnson Wildflower Center on a restoration project for the endangered Blackland Prairie. Finally, Ella Wooten Neighborhood Park is a three-acre green space located roughly in the center of Mueller's residential section. It houses a Junior Olympic-sized swimming pool, open seasonally, as well as a playscape and basketball court.

The Mueller Community also has more electric cars per capita than any other neighborhood in the United States - a fact partially attributable to an incentive program.

== Home builders ==
Home construction companies that are active in the area include David Weekley Homes, Meritage Homes Corporation, CalAtlantic Homes, Streetman Homes, Saldaña Homes, Wes Peoples, Centerra, Homes By Avi, and Muskin Homes.

== Affordability ==
Approximately 25% of the planned residential homes are to be part of the Mueller Affordable Program, available under a shared equity or fixed appreciation scheme (fixed appreciation was implemented during July 2012 and applies to all affordable housing entered into subsequent to the implementation date). The affordable program has a purchase component which is available to households earning less than 80% of the city's mean family income (MFI), and a rental program available to those earning less than 60% of the Austin MFI.

== Community ==
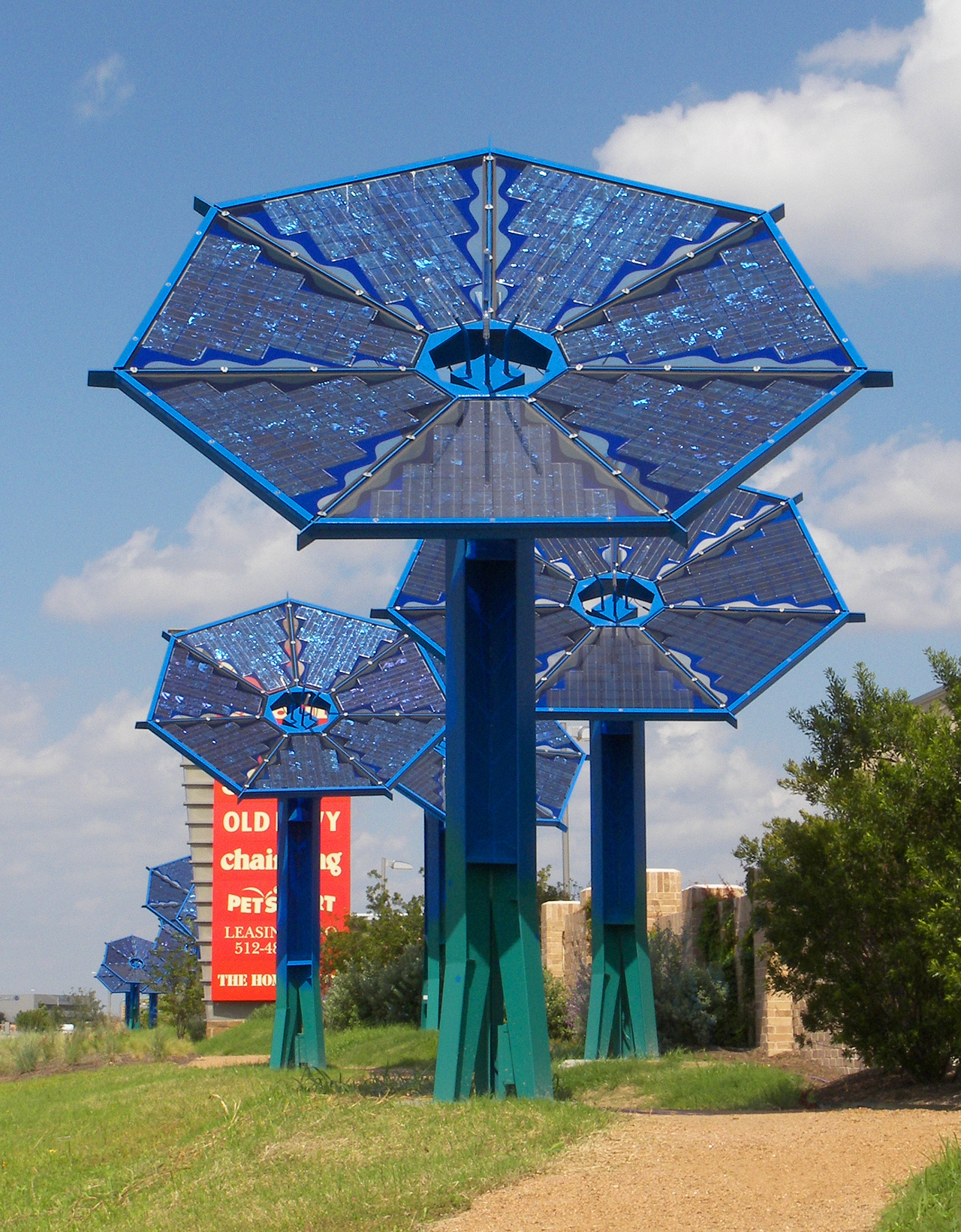
A solar array in Mueller

Members of the Mueller community formed the Mueller Neighborhood Association to foment strong ties among neighbors, as well as awareness of new developments in the area. The neighborhood association has its own website muellerneighborhood.org. Other neighborhood social tools include a closed Mueller Neighbors Facebook group, a closed Next Door group, and the POA-sponsored community Web site

== Education ==
Residents are zoned to the Austin Independent School District. The first half of the community is zoned to Maplewood Elementary School, Kealing Middle School, and McCallum High School, although Reagan High School is only 1.5 miles away from the development. The community includes a site for a future middle school. The second part of the development tracks to Blanton Elementary School, Bertha Sadler Means and Gus Garcia Middle Schools and Reagan High School.
