= Robert Krebs =

American railroad executive

Robert D. Krebs is an American railroad executive who has headed three major United States railroads in succession, leading the Southern Pacific (SP) when it was acquired by Santa Fe Industries, rising to lead the resulting Santa Fe Pacific Corporation, and finally being chosen to head the new Burlington Northern Santa Fe (BNSF) when Santa Fe Pacific (the holding company for the Santa Fe railroad) merged with Burlington Northern.

He started out working for SP subsidiary Cotton Belt in the early 1960s becoming the youngest Superintendent of Cotton Belt's Pine Bluff Division in 1971 at age 29. Krebs eventually become president of the SP and later CEO of ATSF and BNSF. He retired as CEO of BNSF in 2000 and left the board when he retired as chairman on April 17, 2002.

On May 13, 2005, Krebs joined the Board of Directors for Railpower Technologies, a position from which he resigned on September 9, 2005, citing personal reasons.

On December 10, 2024, Krebs became the interim President of Lake Forest College after having served on the college's Board of Trustees since 1990. Prior to becoming interim President Krebs was twice Chairman of the Board of Trustees.

| Preceded by Edward L. Moyers (SP) | Railroader of the Year; 1996 shared with Gerald Grinstein (BN) | Succeeded by Paul M. Tellier (CN) |
| New title | Chief Executive Officer of BNSF Railway | Succeeded by Matthew K. Rose |
