= Thinkery =

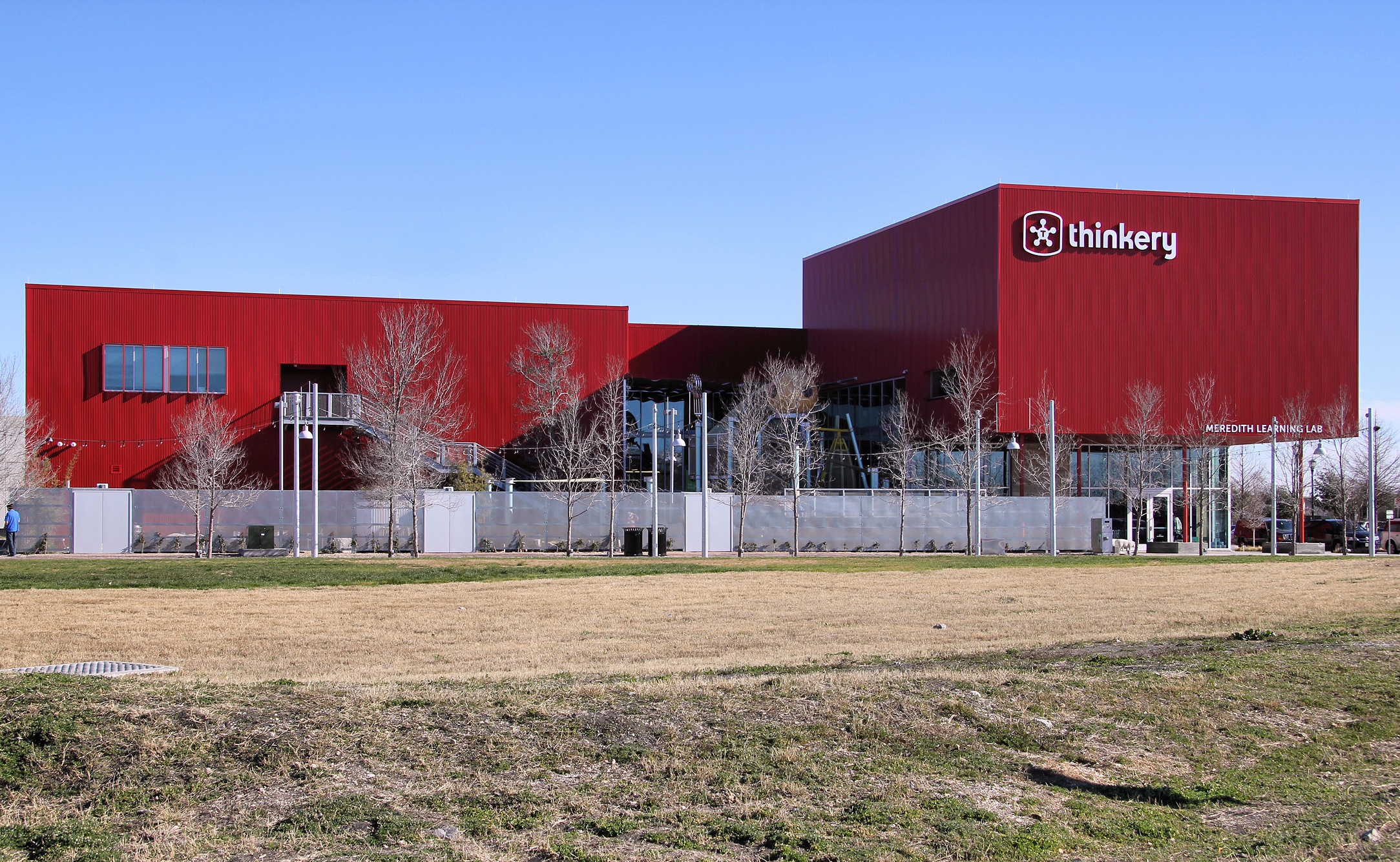

- Location of The Thinkery in Texas
- Established: 1983
- Location: 1830 Simond Ave, Austin, Texas, United States
- Coordinates: 30.2975°N 97.7050°W
- Type: Children's
- Director: Trish Young Brown (2017-Present)
- Website: thinkeryaustin.org

Thinkery (formerly the Austin Children's Museum) is a children's museum in Austin, Texas.

== History ==
The museum was founded in 1983 without a permanent location, providing traveling exhibits in public places such as malls, parks and libraries. In 1987, a storefront on Fifth Street became the Austin Children's Museum's first established location. In 1997, a fundraising campaign, including a million-dollar donation by Michael and Susan Dell, helped the museum move to a larger space at Colorado and Second Street.

The Austin Children's Museum announced its new name, Thinkery, on June 4, 2013. The downtown location closed on September 7, 2013, with the new Thinkery location opening December 7 at the Meredith Learning Lab — a 40,000-square-foot facility in the Mueller Community.

In 2015, nearly 500,000 visitors came to Thinkery.

== Overview ==
Thinkery was designed to meet the demand of the greater Austin region and its families. Its mission is to provide learning experiences for children and their families in Science, Technology, Engineering, Art, and Math (STEAM) subjects.

== Recognition ==
- Thinkery was one of 33 organizations selected to participate in Cognizant's Making the Future grant program. Thinkery established its Spark Club program as a result of this grant.
- In 2014, Thinkery was one of three organizations in Texas designated as a host site for Maker Corps. Part of the Maker Education Initiative, Thinkery was selected to host a resident Maker and engage local youth in STEAM learning through making-oriented projects.
- The Smithsonian Latino Center selected Thinkery as a host site for their Young Ambassadors Program — a nationally recognized program for graduating high school seniors.
- Thinkery was the first children's museum selected to participate in Portal to the Public — a National Science Foundation funded program to increase interactions between volunteer scientists and the public.
- Thinkery was chosen as a local site for the City of Austin's Google Fiber Community Connections program.
