= Defense Fuel Support Point Ozol =

US jet fuel storage and transfer terminal

Coordinates: 38.026°N 122.169°W

The Defense Fuel Support Point Ozol (DFSP Ozol) is located at Ozol, California, US along the Carquinez Strait. It is a jet fuel bulk storage and transfer terminal operated by contractors on behalf of the Defense Logistics Agency's Defense Fuel Supply Center, which was renamed DLA - Energy in 1977.

During its last active years, DFSP Ozol was responsible for the purchase and truck transportation of JP-5 and JP-8 petroleum needs of ANG Fresno, ANG Klamath; CGAS San Francisco, ANG Reno, Travis AFB, and FAA Sacramento.

== Background ==
The terminal was built in the 1940s, and was not in service as of 2000. The facility today covers 76 acres and has a storage capacity of one million barrels of jet fuel using twelve underground tanks that are hardened to withstand nuclear attack. The nuclear-hardened facility was constructed in 1959 by the Holley Corporation and leased to the federal government until the Air Force purchased the facility in 1980. DLA has managed the facility since 1980, and Tenco Services, Inc., operated it under contract from 1990 through 1999, when the facility was placed in closure mode.

DFSP Ozol is served by a ship port, an interstate pipeline and a railroad terminal. The waterfront pier is 880 feet long with 40 feet of depth alongside. It is located 270 feet offshore, with a connecting pier to the shore. The DFSP is connected to the Kinder Morgan SFPP (Santa Fe Pacific Pipeline) interstate pipeline. It is adjacent to the Union Pacific Railroad's Martinez Subdivision, however the spur track to the railcar loading racks has been disconnected from the main line.
