= Catellus Development Corporation =

American real estate developer

- Formerly: Santa Fe Pacific Realty (1984-1989)
- Type: Developer
- Genre: Property development
- Founded: 1984 (as Santa Fe Pacific Realty)
- Headquarters: Emeryville, California
- Area served: Contiguous United States
- Services: Public / Private Partnerships, Land Development, Master Developer, Vertical Development, Brownfield Redevelopment, Mixed-Use Development, Infrastructure, Sustainable Development
- Website: catellus.com

Catellus Development Corporation is an Emeryville, California based, national real estate developer. Founded in 1984 to be the real estate division of Santa Fe Pacific Corporation, as part of the Santa Fe–Southern Pacific merger. It was spun off into its own company in 1989, after the two railroads split. Catellus created contemporary developments throughout California, including Mission Bay and Alameda Landing in the San Francisco Bay Area. Catellus was also a proponent of the Emery Go-Round tram network.

== History ==
In 1984, the Atchison, Topeka and Santa Fe Railway and the Southern Pacific Lines announced plans to merge all their assets into a single railway. As part of the merger, Santa Fe Pacific Realty, the real estate arm, was incorporated after the announcement. In 1986, the Interstate Commerce Commission denied the merger, as it would have created a monopoly on mainline freight movements in California and its bordering states. As a result, the two railroads split in 1988. The real estate arm was spun off in 1989 and was renamed Catellus Development Corporation to manage the stations and land parcels next to the railroad tracks remaining under their ownership. It would later come to own numerous properties across the continent. Catellus became independent from Santa Fe Pacific in 1990.

Between 1999 and 2004, The Wildlands Conservancy acquired more than 587,000 of lands in the Mohave Desert from Catellus and donated it to the National Park Service and Bureau of Land Management.

On June 7, 2005, Catellus Development Corporation announced it will merge into ProLogis (NYSE: PLD) for $3.6 billion ($5.5 billion in 2018 dollars). The deal closed on September 15, 2005.

In late 2010, the private equity firm TPG Capital announced its intent to acquire a collection of real estate and the Catellus trademark from ProLogis. The deal closed in 2011.

Today, the developer operates with headquarters in Emeryville, California with regional offices in Austin, Texas; Newport Beach, California; and Tempe, Arizona.

== Assets ==
=== In California ===
The company owned Los Angeles Union Station; they sold it on April 14, 2011, to Metro. Catellus previously held an entitlement from the city council for developing sites surrounding the station until 2022, which included the station's restoration and seismic upgrades, in addition to constructing the MTA Building. The entitlement expired with the sale to Metro.

It is no longer the owner of the Santa Fe Depot in San Diego, but created the Santa Fe Place transit oriented development on parcels surrounding it. The Grande twin towers are part of that project.

In the San Francisco Bay Area, it currently owns the Pacific Commons retail center in Fremont. The master planned Alameda Landing, located near Alameda Point is also a current project under their portfolio.

=== Outside California ===
Catellus has overseen construction of the master planned Mueller Community in Austin, Texas. Catellus is also master developer of Novus Innovation Cooridor in partnership with Arizona State University in Tempe, Arizona.

== Projects ==
- HYPERSCALE DATA CENTER CAMPUS - Frederick County, MD
- Airpark 599 - Stockton, California
- Alameda Landing and Bayport - Alameda, California
- Circle Point Corporate Campus - Westminster, Colorado
- East Bay Bridge and Bridgecourt - Emeryville/Oakland, California
- Foothill Glen - Union City, California
- Kaiser Commerce Center - San Bernardino, California
- Los Angeles Union Station - Los Angeles, California
- Mission Bay - San Francisco, California
- Mueller - Austin, Texas
- Novus Innovation Corridor - Tempe, AZ
- Victoria Commons - San Antonio, TX
