= Pacific Commons =

Mixed-use development in Fremont, CA

Coordinates: 37°30′16.45″N 121°57′58.95″W

Pacific Commons is a mixed-use development consisting of 840 acres in Fremont, California, currently in development by Catellus Development Corporation. It sits on part of the site of what was once the Fremont Dragstrip/Baylands Raceway Park and the Sky Sailing Airport, a glider field. Given Fremont's location at the Northern tip of Silicon Valley, Catellus originally planned the development to house primarily high-tech research and development operations with a moderate amount of retail and restaurant space, a convention center, and a hotel. Until the dot-com bubble, Cisco Systems had planned to relocate its headquarters to Pacific Commons and consolidate substantially all of its San Francisco Bay Area operations to a large campus in Pacific Commons, which would have consisted of several high-rise office buildings. With the downturn in the technology industry, Cisco put its plans on hold. While it is unclear whether Cisco will ultimately relocate its headquarters to Fremont, in 2011 Cisco purchased 149 acres of vacant land in Fremont, most of it from Catellus, fueling speculation that, at some point, it will move forward with its headquarters move to Pacific Commons.

To mitigate environmental impacts caused by the massive scale of the project, Catellus donated hundreds of acres of land along the southern and western boundaries of Pacific Commons to the Don Edwards San Francisco Bay National Wildlife Refuge. Further environmental mitigation involved building a causeway as a portion of Cushing Parkway over the wetlands preserve from Pacific Commons southward to Fremont Boulevard and Interstate 880 near the Fremont Marriott Hotel. Today, Pacific Commons contains more than one million square feet of research and development and industrial space, including a 500,000 square-foot distribution center for Office Depot. More than one hundred acres of land slated for research and development uses remains undeveloped.

== Pacific Commons Retail District ==
A large portion of Pacific Commons was re-entitled by the City of Fremont to retail use in early 2004, and by October of that year Catellus opened the regional shopping center. The shopping district, a hybrid regional shopping center, power center, and lifestyle center, is anchored by Costco, Lowe's Home Improvement, Ashley HomeStore, Target, and Nordstrom Rack.

A major expansion of the retail district opened in March 2012. The expansion is a shopping and entertainment sub-district called The Block @ Pacific Commons and includes a lifestyle center anchored by Target and a 16-screen Century Theatres multiplex. The Block also features a promenade consisting of shops, restaurants and eateries leading from the Target store to the theater. The shop frontage along Pacific Commons Boulevard faces the sidewalks, in an attempt to resemble the appearance of a traditional small-town downtown retail area (a common feature of lifestyle centers).

After The Block @ Pacific Commons was completed, the Pacific Commons retail district now contains just under 1,200,000 sq ft (110,000 m^{2}) of gross leasable space on 106 acres (43 ha) and is the largest shopping center in southern Alameda County.

In 2026, it was announced that Pacific Commons is expanding with 3 new shops and restaurants.

== Cisco Field ==
In April 2006, the owner Lewis Wolff took a modified version of his so-called Ballpark Village proposal, Cisco Field, to Fremont where a large 143-acre (0.6 km^{2}) parcel of land was available north of Mission Boulevard and south of Auto Mall Parkway off Interstate 880 in Pacific Commons. Most of the land was purchased by Cisco Systems. The land was bought in the late 1990s by Cisco in anticipation of company growth that never occurred due to the dot com bust. Additional land was also purchased by Lewis Wolff's development group to bring the total land up to approximately 240 acres (1.0 km^{2}) at the ballpark village site.

The plan called for the 240 acres (1.0 km^{2}) to be developed into a combination of commercial, retail, and residential spaces in addition to the construction of a 34,000-seat baseball-only facility. The planned development was similar to the Santana Row development in nearby San Jose with the addition of the baseball park. The planned name for the park was Cisco Field as first announced by the Fremont city council after meeting with Wolff on November 8, 2006. The stadium would have been privately financed primarily from sales of the surrounding "ballpark village" residential and commercial properties to offset the cost of the stadium. The site plan proposed 520,000 square feet (48,000 m^{2}) of commercial space adjacent to the ballpark, and would have included a hotel, restaurant, movie theater and several parking garages of varying size. Its plans also called for 2,900 homes. More than 580 of those residences — including 12 each behind the left- and right-field bleachers — would have been sprinkled into retail space north and east of Cisco Field, a 32,000-seat stadium with an estimated $450 million price tag.

In addition, 2,318 town homes would have been built on 115 acres (0.5 km^{2}) south and west of the ballpark. The housing would have been built in phases, and designs showed that a 41-acre (170,000 m^{2}) team-owned parcel would have provided nearly 6,000 parking spaces until the town homes were built there. The earliest the stadium would have opened was for the 2011 season.

In 2010, the deal fell through and was cancelled San Jose was being considered for the ballpark instead.
