= Santa Fe Industries =

Former American diversified parent company of primarily railroad interest

- Industry: Railroad; Construction; Real estate; Energy production
- Founded: 1968; 57 years ago
- Defunct: 1983
- Successor: Santa Fe Pacific Corporation
- Headquarters: Chicago, Illinois, United States
- Key people: John Shedd Reed; John J. Schmidt

Santa Fe Industries was the diversified parent company, headquartered in Chicago, of the Atchison, Topeka and Santa Fe Railway. Formed in 1968, its non-railroad operations included construction, real estate, and energy units. In the early 1980s, after longtime head John Shedd Reed had been succeeded by John J. Schmidt, they arranged a merger with the Southern Pacific, where new head Robert Krebs had recently succeeded Benjamin Biaggini.

When the Interstate Commerce Commission denied permission to merge the respective companies' railroad subsidiaries as the Southern Pacific Santa Fe Railroad, the merged holding company, which retained both companies' non-rail interests while being forced to sell the Southern Pacific, changed its name to Santa Fe Pacific Corporation.

It has also been linked to controversies in the book titled American House of Saud by Steven Emerson.

Santa Fe Industries, Inc. v. Green, 430 U.S. 462 (1977) is a Supreme Court of the United States case on share price, manipulation and deception.
