= Joseph H. Boardman =

American transportation official (1948–2019)

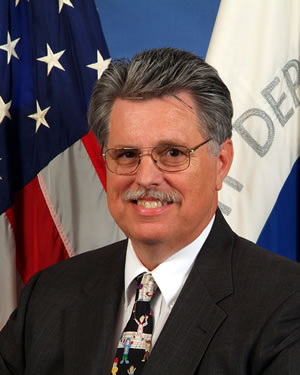

President and CEO of Amtrak
- In office November 25, 2008 – September 1, 2016
- Preceded by: Alexander Kummant
- Succeeded by: Charles "Wick" Moorman

11th Administrator of the Federal Railroad Administration
- In office April 28, 2005 – November 25, 2008
- President: George W. Bush
- Preceded by: Allan Rutter
- Succeeded by: Joseph C. Szabo

Commissioner of the New York State Department of Transportation
- In office 1997–2005
- Governor: George Pataki
- Preceded by: John Daly
- Succeeded by: Thomas J. Madison, Jr.

Personal details
- Born: December 23, 1948 Taberg, New York, U.S.
- Died: March 7, 2019 (aged 70) Pasco County, Florida, U.S.
- Party: Republican
- Spouse: Joanne
- Children: 3
- Education: Cornell University (BS); Binghamton University (MS)
- Profession: Transportation professional

Joseph Houston Boardman (December 23, 1948 – March 7, 2019) was an American transportation executive.

Boardman served as commissioner of the New York State Department of Transportation (NYSDOT) from 1997 until 2005, then led the United States Federal Railroad Administration until 2008, then served as president and CEO of Amtrak until 2016.

Boardman is the longest-serving NYSDOT chief and the second-longest serving head of Amtrak, after W. Graham Claytor, Jr. in the 1980s. In 2014, Railway Age magazine named Boardman its 51st "Railroader of the Year".

== Early life and military service ==
Boardman was a lifelong resident of New York State, born the second of eight children born and raised on a dairy farm in Oneida County, which two of his siblings used to operate for a long time until recently. In 1966, he volunteered for military service in the United States Air Force, serving in South Vietnam from 1968 to 1969. Upon receiving an honorable discharge from the Air Force, he studied Agriculture Economics at Cornell University, receiving his bachelor's degree in 1974, and graduated with a master's degree in Management Science from Binghamton University in 1983.

== Career ==
=== Early positions ===
Boardman's first jobs in transportation were managing the transit authorities for the cities of Rome and Utica in Upstate New York. In 1981, he became the commissioner of public transportation for Broome County, New York, which includes the city of Binghamton. He left government service in 1988 to start his own transportation management company, called Progressive Transportation Services.

New York Governor George Pataki nominated Boardman in 1997 to serve as commissioner of the New York State Department of Transportation (NYSDOT). Boardman went on to become the longest-serving commissioner in NYSDOT history, remaining in that position from July 1997 through May 2005. During his term as commissioner, he also served a stint as chair of the American Association of State Highway and Transportation Officials' (AASHTO) Standing Committee on Rail Transportation (SCORT).

=== Federal Railroad Administration ===
In March 2005, Boardman was nominated by President George W. Bush to become the administrator of the United States Federal Railroad Administration. He was confirmed by the United States Senate on April 28, 2005, and began working as FRA Administrator on June 1 of that year.

Boardman was the 11th Federal Railroad Administrator. In this role, he was responsible for overseeing all aspects of operations for the nearly eight hundred-person organization. This included managing comprehensive safety programs and regulatory initiatives; enforcement of FRA safety regulations; development and implementation of national freight and passenger rail policy; and oversight of diverse research and development activities in support of improved railroad safety. During this time, he also served as chairman of the executive committee of the Transportation Research Board (TRB).

=== Early years at Amtrak career (2008–2009) ===
The Amtrak Board of Directors on November 25, 2008, announced that Boardman had been appointed to a one-year term as president and CEO of the railway to replace Alexander Kummant. In January 2010, Amtrak announced that Boardman's appointment had been extended indefinitely.

Railway rescues

Amtrak has worked closely with states using stimulus funds to purchase 130 next-generation bi-level cars and 35 next-generation diesel locomotives to upgrade corridor service in the Midwest, California, and Washington State. Other major orders for new equipment are in the works, marking the beginning of a renewal of Amtrak's aging fleet. Using stimulus funds from the American Recovery and Reinvestment Act of 2009, Amtrak rescued from the wreck yards more than 90 railcars, rebuilt them, and put them into service. The added capacity allowed Amtrak's passenger totals to grow by record numbers, more than one million year-over-year in 2010, 2011, and 2012, and revenues increased as well.

Boardman led an effort to augment and replace Amtrak's fleet of high-speed Acela Express trains with about 28 new trainsets. The company issued a RfP (request for proposals) in December, 2013. Offers were due by May, 2014, with negotiations likely to continue until the end of the year before a contract could be signed. The new trains would substantially increase capacity on the Northeast Corridor, where Amtrak shows an operating profit. Major new orders of equipment include 70 electric locomotives for the Regionals and the long-distance trains operating over the Northeast Corridor. Another is for 130 Viewliner II diners, crew dorm-baggage cars, sleepers, and baggage cars to replace worn-out "Heritage" equipment (built before Amtrak was formed in 1971) for the Eastern long-distance trains. The first of the ACS-64 electric locomotives entered service on February 7, 2014. The Viewliner II cars began service later that year.

=== Recent Amtrak developments (2013–2016) ===
In May 2013, Boardman signed to a two-year "renewable" contract. Board Chairman Anthony Coscia said, "We are extremely pleased with the progress Amtrak has made under the leadership of Joe Boardman". Boardman's salary during 2013 was $350,000. At Amtrak, Joe Boardman oversees an organization that carried a record 31.2 million passengers and had $3 billion in revenue while employing more than 20,000 people in fiscal year 2013. Since Boardman's appointment, Amtrak made progress cutting debt, purchasing new equipment, and improving infrastructure, with cost recovery reaching a new company peak of 93% in 2014. E-ticketing and electronic payment for on-board snacks, meals, and beverages have been put in place, as well as Wi-Fi on most trains. Boardman is perhaps the longest serving high-level Republican appointee under President Barack Obama.

On December 9, 2015, Boardman announced in a letter to employees that he would be leaving Amtrak in September 2016. He had advised the Amtrak Board of Directors of his decision the previous week. Boardman's successor, former Norfolk Southern Railway President & CEO Charles "Wick" Moorman, was named in August 2016 and took over on September 1, 2016. P42DC unit 42 was later named after Boardman.

== Personal life and death ==
Boardman and his wife, Joanne, had three children. He suffered a stroke while on vacation in Florida on March 5, 2019, and died on March 7.

== Awards ==
Railway Age magazine named Joseph H. Boardman as its 51st "Railroader of the Year" in its January 9, 2014, issue, which featured a column about him and a printed interview with him. A video of the interview can be seen at railwayage.com.

Boardman's name currently adorns the side of AMTK P42DC locomotive #42, a locomotive that is painted in tribute to America's Veterans from America's railroad.

== See also ==
- List of railroad executives

Business positions
Preceded by Alexander Kummant, William Crosbie (interim)	President of Amtrak; 2008 – 2016	Succeeded by Charles "Wick" Moorman
