= Carnegie Group =

The Carnegie Group brings together the science ministers and senior officials from the G7 nations and some others including the European Commission in meetings, possibly every six months or every year. The location of meetings rotates from country to country.

== History ==
The Carnegie Group of Science Advisers to Presidents and Prime Ministers was established in 1991 by William T. Golden, businessman, chairman of the Board of the American Museum of Natural History, and long-time adviser on national science policy issues in the US, and D. Allan Bromley, a Canadian-born physicist who was the national science adviser to President George H.W.Bush. It met twice yearly since its creation, but since 2009 meets annually. Members of the Group alternate in hosting the meetings. The Carnegie Group, an informal group designed to bring together the science ministers and advisors of the G7 countries and the EU to discuss issues of mutual concern and interest, has been faithful to the original design envisioned by its founders. But it is also a group that has adapted to changing circumstances and to the growing importance of the emerging economies of China, India, Brazil, Mexico and South Africa. Recent meetings of the Carnegie Group have been adjusted in order to engage these countries and address key regional and global questions and challenges of shared concern.

The format of the Carnegie Group meetings has also had to be flexible. In meeting on weekends, rotating locales and hosts, it still functions as an informal gathering, with no official record kept of the proceedings. However it has also been cognizant of the need to respond to emerging issues while continuing to focus on major global problems where science can provide sustainable solutions. Members of the Group have also articulated a desire to exert more influence in raising the profile of science and science issues at the G-7 summit level. The growing importance of the G-7 (and now G-20) summits along with the close links between those agendas and the topics discussed by Carnegie certainly underlines the value of the Group. Indeed, the continued need to address major subjects such as capacity building in Africa, climate change and energy futures, global health and pandemics, and large scale research infrastructure have all required the collective knowledge and wisdom of its members. South Africa offered to host the 38th Carnegie Group meeting in 2011, the first time the Group met outside of the G7. Five short history volumes describe the agenda, issues, and origins of the Carnegie meetings written by members of the Carnegie Group, with the latest volume published in December 2010. (see Science Advisers to Presidents and Prime Ministers-Volume V, A Brief History of the Carnegie Group, 2005-2007, by Arthur J Carty and Paul Dufour)

Currently, there are 14 participating parties including Brazil, Canada, China, the European Union, France, Germany, India, Italy, Japan, Mexico, Russia, South Africa, the United Kingdom, and the United States.

The name Carnegie Group also refers to an unrelated company.

== Recent Meetings ==
- September 28–30, 2017
- 44th meeting, November 4–6, 2016
- 43rd meeting, November 20–22, 2015, Gurgaon, India
- October 2010, London, Ontario, (Canada)
- October 2009, Kazan (Russia)
- June 2008, Okinawa, (Japan)
- December 2007, Bath, Somerset (UK)
