= Strait Area Transit =

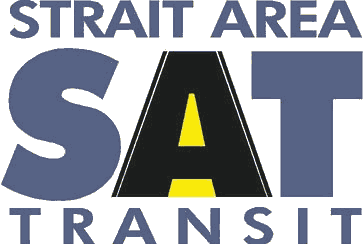
- Founded: 2008
- Service area: Inverness County and Richmond County, Nova Scotia
- Service type: bus service
- Operator: Strait Area Transit Co-operative Ltd.
- Website: satbus

Strait Area Transit is a provider of public transportation based in Inverness County and Richmond County, Nova Scotia, Canada. Established in 2008, it operates not as a government-sponsored agency, but rather as a non-profit cooperative charity. The organization offers daily fixed route, and Dial-A-Ride services in the South-Central Inverness County, Richmond County area.

== Routes ==
- 1/2 Mainland Richmond: L'Ardoise-St. Peters-River Bourgeois-Louisdale-Lower River-Port Hawkesbury
- 3/4 Isle Madame: Port Royal-West Arichat-Arichat-Rocky Bay-D'Ecousse-Poulamon-Louisdale-Lower River-Port Hawkesbury
- 5/6 Inverness: Inverness-Mabou-Port Hood-Harbourview-Judique-Troy-Port Hawkesbury, East Lake Ainslie, and Whycocomagh
