= David Hughes (railroad executive) =

American railroad executive

David J. Hughes is an American railroad executive.

Hughes has worked in the railroad industry for more than 30 years and was a member of Amtrak's senior management since 2002, serving as the company's Chief Engineer under President David L. Gunn.

The decision by Amtrak's board of directors to fire Gunn on November 9, 2005, saw Hughes named the interim President and chief executive officer until a permanent replacement could be recruited.

Hughes was replaced by Alexander Kummant on August 29, 2006.

== See also ==
- List of railroad executives

Business positions
Preceded by David L. Gunn	President of Amtrak; 2005 – 2006	Succeeded by Alexander Kummant
