= Lathen =

- Municipality
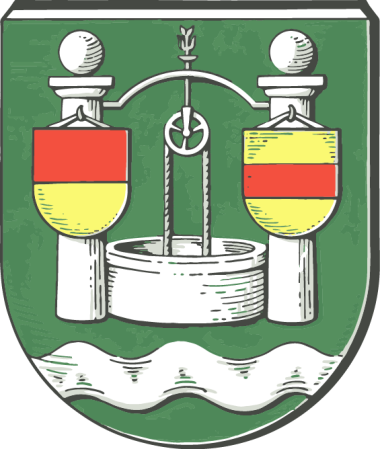
- Coat of arms

- Location of Lathen within Emsland district
- Interactive map of Lathen
- Location within Germany Location within Lower Saxony
- Coordinates: 52°52′N 07°19′E
- Country: Germany
- State: Lower Saxony
- District: Emsland
- Municipal assoc.: Lathen
- Subdivisions: 5

Government
  - Mayor: Norbert Holtermann (CDU)

Area
  - Total: 38.02 km^{2} (14.68 sq mi)
- Elevation: 13 m (43 ft)

Population (2025-12-31)
  - Total: 6,748
  - Density: 177.5/km^{2} (459.7/sq mi)
- Time zone: UTC+01:00 (CET)
  - Summer (DST): UTC+02:00 (CEST)
- Postal codes: 49762
- Dialling codes: 0 59 33
- Vehicle registration: EL

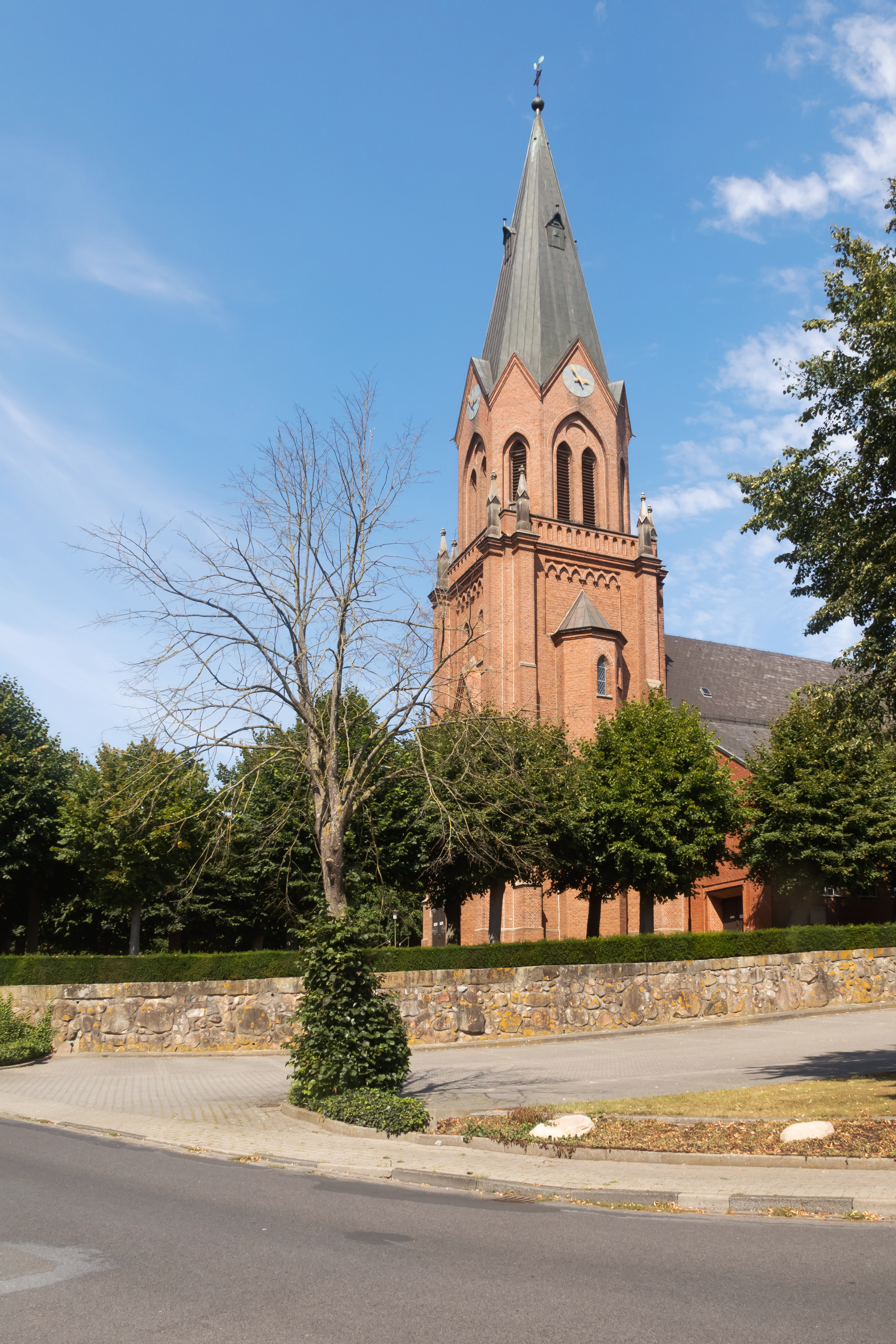
Church: Pfarrkirche Sankt Vitus

Lathen is a municipality in the Emsland district, in Lower Saxony, Germany. It is the location of the Emsland Transrapid Test facility, a testing site for Transrapid maglev trains.

== See also ==
- 2006 Lathen maglev train accident
