= Lathen train collision =

First fatal maglev train accident

Coordinates: 52°52′28″N 7°21′05″E

Details
- Date: 22 September 2006; 09:30
- Location: Lathen, Lower Saxony
- Country: Germany
- Line: Lathen - Dörpen test track
- Operator: Transrapid International
- Incident type: Collision
- Cause: Human error

Statistics
- Trains: 1 + MOW vehicle
- Deaths: 23
- Injured: 11

On 22 September 2006, a Transrapid magnetic levitation (or "maglev") train collided with a maintenance vehicle near Lathen, Germany, killing 23 people and wounding 11. It was the first fatal crash involving a maglev train.

== Background ==
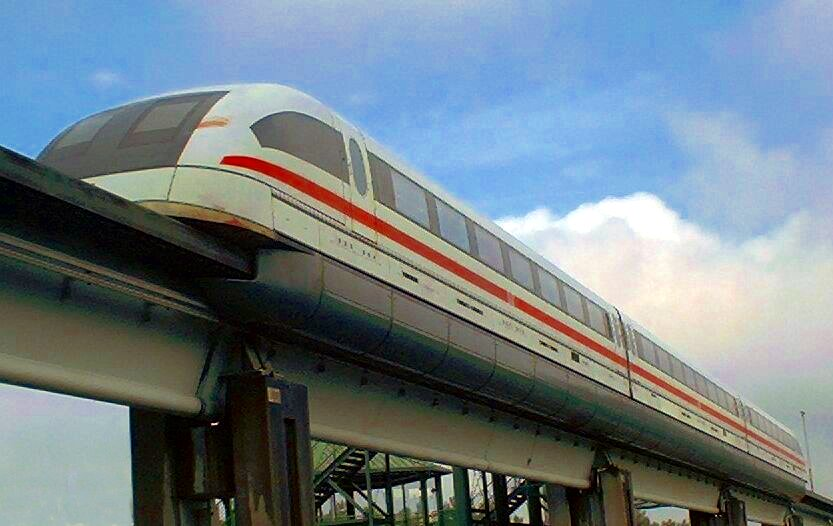
File photo of a Transrapid train on its test track

The Transrapid 08 was still doing trial runs but would sometimes carry passengers along the 31.8-kilometre (19.8 mi) test track to demonstrate the maglev technology. The Emsland test track ran from Lathen, near where the accident occurred, north to Dörpen, with a loop at each end and a depot side track near the southern loop. Speeds of up to 450 km/h (280 mph) were expected on the test track.

Maglev trains use powerful magnets to hover 1 centimetre (0.39 in) above the tracks.

== Collision ==
Every morning a wheeled, diesel-powered maintenance vehicle ran along the tracks to check them for debris. When its work was finished it would wait in front of the last switch. There were two workers on the maintenance vehicle. They radioed the line dispatcher for clearance to leave the track but did not get a response. They were unaware of a test run scheduled that morning half an hour earlier than usual. The test run was carrying visitors from associated companies, including employees at Transrapid, workers from a local nursing care company, and workers from local utility company RWE.

The maglev train was boarded according to usual routine. It left the station at 09:43 and firstly went for a brake test, then had to wait for clearance from the line dispatcher. The line dispatchers energized the tracks at 09:52 and one line dispatcher radioed the maglev train to proceed. No communication with the maintenance vehicle is recorded. The train rapidly accelerated to the 170 km/h that was common for the first test round before the 450 km/h on the subsequent test rounds.

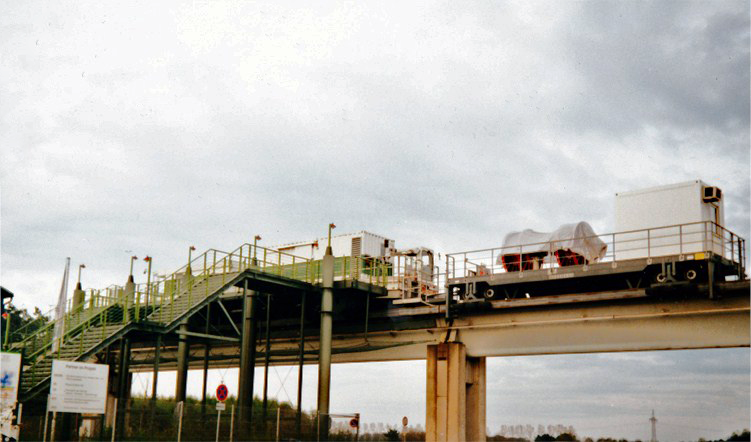
Maintenance vehicle in normal operation

The train started moving at 09:53, and 57 seconds later emergency braking was recorded. Approximately half a second and 25 metres later the maglev train hit the maintenance vehicle at a speed of 162 km/h. The aerodynamic design of the Transrapid train caused it to dive under the 60-tonne maintenance vehicle, ripping off the roof of the maglev train. The wreckage continued for another 300 metres on the track before coming to a halt.

There were 23 fatalities and 11 injuries, 10 severe. The two-man crew of the maintenance vehicle were among the survivors as they were at the opposite end of the vehicle. Three survivors from the Transrapid were rescued by removing the bottom panel when they were heard knocking underneath. Two engineers sitting in the rear section of the maglev survived, and three other passengers were saved later by cutting through the remains of the maglev train. None escaped unscathed.

== Emergency response ==
Firefighters used turntable ladders and aerial platforms to reach the wreckage 4 metres (13 ft) above ground level.

== Aftermath ==
=== Immediate ===
Immediately after the accident, German transport minister Wolfgang Tiefensee held an emergency meeting with representatives from Siemens and ThyssenKrupp, the two companies jointly responsible for the Transrapid. He commented afterwards that "major safety failings" were the clear cause of the accident, and that two key questions requiring answers were whether the Transrapid's safety measures were adequate, and whether they were applied on the test track. He also promised an independent inquiry.

German Chancellor Angela Merkel left a conference in Berlin in order to attend the scene. Wu Xiangming, head of the Shanghai maglev project, also visited the scene.

=== Later investigation ===
German authorities conducted an investigation into the accident. Rudolf Schwarz, head of operators at test track operator IABG, said, "This accident would not have been possible if all regulations were adhered to." According to IABG, the crew of the maintenance vehicle, which clears the test track of debris and dirt every morning, was supposed to radio the line dispatcher once the work was finished. German police therefore suspected human error as the likely cause of the accident. Prosecutors obtained and examined radio transcripts from the vehicles involved.

In May 2008, a court in Osnabrück concluded that the tragedy was caused by a chain of human errors, including the failure to set an electronic braking system that would have prevented the train from operating while maintenance work was being carried out. Two staff members were found guilty on 23 counts of manslaughter and 11 counts of causing negligent injury and were fined €24,000 and €20,000 respectively. The line dispatcher who radioed the clearance to the maglev train was unable to take part in the trial because of suicide fears. The trial of the two line dispatchers both resulted in convictions and prison sentences of one year and six months in one case, and one year in the other. Both sentences were suspended as the defendants were "exceptionally" remorseful, still mentally ill, and retired. They accepted the verdicts immediately.

== Memorial ==
One year after the accident, a memorial stone was installed at the crash site. A panel of steel, set into the stone, is stamped with 23 small crosses, one for each of the lives lost in the accident.

== See also ==
- Eschede train disaster—high-speed train crash in Germany in 1998
- Lists of rail accidents
- List of structural failures and collapses
- List of accidents and disasters by death toll
