= David L. Gunn =

American transit planner and executive (born 1937)

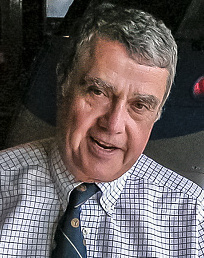
- Gunn in 2002
- Born: June 21, 1937 (age 89); Boston, Massachusetts, U.S.
- Occupation: Transportation official
- Known for: President of Amtrak

David L. Gunn (born June 21, 1937) is a transportation system administrator who has headed several significant railroads and transit systems in North America. He was director of operations of the Massachusetts Bay Transportation Authority (MBTA) from 1975 to 1979, general manager and chief operations officer of SEPTA from 1979 to 1984, president of the New York City Transit Authority from 1984 to 1990, the general manager at the Washington Metropolitan Area Transit Authority (WMATA) 1991 to 1994, and chief general manager of the Toronto Transit Commission in Canada from 1995 to 1999. Gunn assumed the presidency of Amtrak on May 15, 2002, and held the position until political upheaval at the company in 2005. A dual citizen of the U.S. and Canada, Gunn retired to his family home on Cape Breton Island in Nova Scotia, Canada. He is currently associated with the Free Congress Foundation and the board of the Strait Area Transit Cooperative transit service in rural Richmond County, among other roles.

== Early life and education ==
Gunn was born in Boston to parents of Canadian ancestry whose families had emigrated to Massachusetts from Nova Scotia and Newfoundland. Gunn was educated at Phillips Academy in Andover and received a Bachelor of Business Administration from Harvard College in 1959. He served in the United States Navy Reserve from 1959 to 1962. He received a Masters in Business Administration from Harvard Graduate School of Business Administration in 1964.

== Career ==
=== Early positions (1964 to 1984) ===
Gunn joined the rail road industry in 1964 as a staff analyst for the Atchison, Topeka and Santa Fe Railway. He served in the position for three years. He then joined the New York Central Railroad, serving there from 1967 to 1968. From 1969 to 1974, he served as an assistant vice-president of the Illinois Central Gulf Railroad.

In 1974, Gunn moved into public transit when he joined the Massachusetts Bay Transportation Authority (MBTA) as director of commuter rail in Greater Boston. He was later named the MBTA's director of operations in 1975 and remained in that position until 1979. Gunn then became general manager and chief operations officer of SEPTA, serving from 1979 to 1984.

=== New York City Transit Authority (1984 to 1990) ===
He was president of New York City Transit Authority (NYCTA), 1984 to 1990, and according to The New York Times, Gunn is credited with turning around the New York City subway system in the late 1980s." During his tenure as president of the NYCTA, Gunn instituted operational changes that led to the reduction of graffiti and service improvements in the New York City Subway system, including the establishment of a "clean car program" and restoring the system to a state of good repair. Cars were to be regularly cleaned, hundreds of older cars overhauled and tracks and stations rebuilt. The "Redbird" cars were originally known as "Gunn Red" or "Broad Street Red" when they were repainted between 1984 and 1989, under Gunn's tenure.

As a reminder of the purchasing issues he overcame, he had a pair of R9 subway car lubricator pads mounted on a plaque in his office. The authority had thousands of them among over $40 million worth of obsolete and excess parts, yet the R9 fleet had been retired since 1977, leaving just a few used on work trains. At the same time, needed parts were not getting purchased.

For his work in New York, he was inducted in the inaugural 1999 class of the New York Public Transit Association's Hall of Fame

=== WMATA (1991–1994) ===
Gunn served as general manager of Washington DC Washington Metropolitan Area Transit Authority (WMATA) from 1991 to 1994.

During his tenure at WMATA (the Washington Metro) from 1991 to 1994, Gunn was frequently at odds with that agency's board of directors, which included representatives from the District of Columbia and suburban jurisdictions in Maryland and Virginia.

=== Toronto Transit Commission (1995 to 1999) ===
From 1995 to 1999, Gunn served as chief general manager of Toronto Transit Commission (TTC).

Gunn has a philosophy called "state of good repair" where the first priority is to maintain infrastructure and equipment, making regular repairs where needed and retiring equipment from service at the end of its life-cycle. This brought him in frequent conflict with TTC chairman Howard Moscoe, who advocated the use of funds for improving TTC accessibility. Gunn's tenure at the TTC was also marked by changes in management structure, which were criticized by his successor, Rick Ducharme, amongst others. He also argued against new subway construction.

Toronto's only fatal subway train accident, the 1995 Russell Hill subway accident that claimed 3 lives, happened only 8 months after Gunn became head of the TTC, with Gunn addressing the incident in the media.

=== Amtrak (2002–2005) ===
==== Beginning of presidency ====
Gunn assumed the presidency of Amtrak on May 15, 2002, after coming out of a three-year retirement to take the job. Gunn came to Amtrak with a reputation as an experienced operating manager. His work as president of the New York City Transit Authority from 1984 to 1990 and as chief general manager of the Toronto Transit Commission in Canada from 1995 to 1999 lent him a great deal of credibility, as these two agencies were each the largest transit operations of their respective countries.

==== Policies and reactions ====
The view of the Gunn administration was a departure from his predecessors' promises to make Amtrak self-sufficient in the short term, as Gunn argued that no form of passenger transportation in the United States is self-sufficient as the economy is currently structured, similar to highways, airports, and air traffic control which all require large government expenditures to build and maintain.

Gunn eliminated almost all of the express business while improving critical equipment repair facilities and services to keep trains moving. In 2002, he stated that continued deferred maintenance would become a safety issue which he would not tolerate and his management team implemented Amtrak's first system-wide comprehensive capital program with planned target dates and budgeting. Under Gunn, Amtrak's ranks of unionized and salaried workers were reduced.

During his administration at Amtrak, Gunn was the subject of congressional criticism. Gunn was polite but direct in response to congressional criticism. Before a congressional hearing, leading Amtrak critic Arizona Senator John McCain demanded the elimination of all operating subsidies; Gunn responded by asking the senator if he would also demand the same of the commuter airlines, upon which the citizens of Arizona are dependent. McCain, not usually at a loss for words when debating Amtrak funding, did not reply.

==== Political upheaval and firing ====
He was fired by the board of directors on November 9, 2005, ostensibly for his refusal to split the company in preparation for privatization; Gunn was opposed to this policy, pointing out that the entire reason Amtrak was created was because private railroad companies did not wish to run passenger services. The New York Times at the time wrote that Gunn's opposition was the reason for the firing, as he was "widely credited with improving the railroad's management, cutting costs and imposing better financial controls," as well as "improving the state of repair of Amtrak's locomotives and aging passenger cars, as well as its tracks, signals and electrical systems, which are truly antique."

However, other recent problems had included Gunn's decision to suspend Acela service in the Northeast Corridor until wheel and brake problems were sorted out with the manufacturer, as well as Gunn's philosophical difference over dividing long distance inter-city services from the Northeast Corridor. A report issued by the Government Accountability Office one week before Gunn's dismissal stated that Amtrak needed to continue to improve the way it monitored performance and oversaw its finances in order to achieve financial stability. The chairman of the board, David Laney, a George W. Bush appointee, provided a statement that read "Amtrak's future now requires a different type of leader who will aggressively tackle the company's financial, management and operational challenges".

== Retirement ==
A dual citizen of the U.S. and Canada, Gunn retired to his family home on Cape Breton Island in Nova Scotia. He has become associated with the Free Congress Foundation since his dismissal from Amtrak. He currently sits on the board of a local transit service in rural Richmond County known as the Strait Area Transit Cooperative and in 2010 returned as a consultant for former employer, WMATA. In November 2014, Amtrak named ACS-64 class unit number 600 after Gunn.

== See also ==
- List of railroad executives

Preceded by ?	General Manager of the SEPTA; 1979-1984	Succeeded by Joseph T. Mack
Preceded by John D. Simpson	President of the New York City Transit Authority; 1984-1990	Succeeded by Alan F. Kiepper
Preceded by William A. Boleyn	General Manager of the Washington Metropolitan Area Transit Authority; 1991-1994	Succeeded by Michael W. Steinbach
Preceded by Al Leach	Chief General Manager of the Toronto Transit Commission; 1995–1999	Succeeded by Rick Ducharme
Preceded by George Warrington	President of Amtrak; 2002-2005	Succeeded by David Hughes
