= Santa Fe–Southern Pacific merger =

1980s attempt at Western US freight rail consolidation

Santa Fe Southern Pacific Corporation

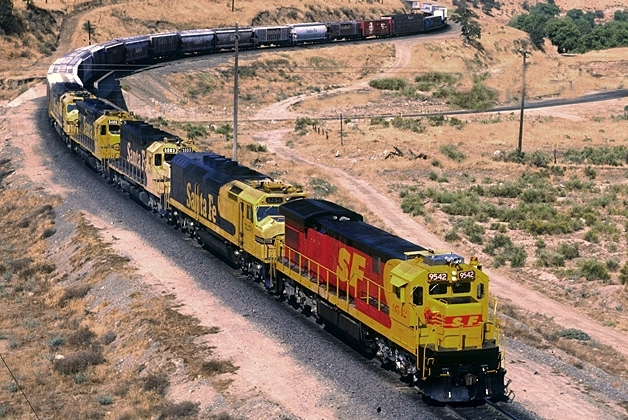
- ATSF train led by a locomotive in the proposed SPSF merger paint scheme
- Industry: Transport, real estate, petroleum and minerals
- Predecessors: Atchison, Topeka and Santa Fe Railway; Southern Pacific Transportation Company
- Founded: December 23, 1983; 42 years ago
- Defunct: April 25, 1989; 37 years ago
- Fate: Southern Pacific Railroad acquired by Rio Grande Industries, Real estate holdings spun-off as Catellus Development Corporation
- Successor: Santa Fe Pacific Corporation
- Key people: John J. Schmidt (Chairman & CEO)

The Santa Fe–Southern Pacific merger was an attempted corporate consolidation of two of the major railroads in the Western United States at the time: the Atchison, Topeka and Santa Fe Railway and the Southern Pacific Railroad. The approximately US$5 billion deal (US$15.5 billion in 2025 dollars) was announced in September 1983 and in December 1983, both companies were acquired by a new holding company, the Southern Pacific Santa Fe Corporation and both companies' extensive non-railroad related assets were immediately combined. However, the Southern Pacific Railroad remained in a voting trust and the railroads continued to be operated independently and competitively while the merger worked through the regulatory process.

In March 1984, the companies asked the Interstate Commerce Commission (ICC) for approval to merge their railroads. Confident the deal would be approved, the company began repainting their locomotives into a new unified paint scheme that would allow the future railroad to be called SPSF.

In a surprise July 1986 decision, the ICC denied the merger and gave the companies two years to split. Southern Pacific was sold to Rio Grande Industries for US$1.02 billion in October 1988, the companies' California real estate holdings were spun off into a new company called Catellus Development Corporation which would become the State's largest private landowner, and the former holding company renamed itself Santa Fe Pacific Corporation and retained the Santa Fe Railroad and all the non-railroad businesses of both predecessors.

== History ==
Amid an era of major railroad mergers and acquisitions, the Atchison, Topeka and Santa Fe Railway and the Southern Pacific Transportation Company announced on September 27, 1983, that they too would merge. Both were major railroads in the Western United States at the time. The merger had long been seen as a logical move, especially since other recent mergers had turned the Burlington Northern Railroad and the Union Pacific Railroad into much larger western railroads, with about the same annual rail revenue of Santa Fe and Southern Pacific combined, and the nation's third-largest railroad.

In December 1983, both companies were acquired by a new holding company, the Santa Fe Southern Pacific Corporation, through a swap of approximately US$5 billion in stock. On March 23, 1984, Santa Fe Southern Pacific formally petitioned the Interstate Commerce Commission (ICC) to approve the merger of the two railroads and while the application was pending, the Southern Pacific remained in a voting trust, and the railroads continued to be operated independently and competitively while the merger worked through the regulatory process. So confident the deal would be approved, the company began repainting their locomotives into a new unified paint scheme that would allow the future railroad to be called the SPSF Railway.

Immediately combined were the company's extensive non-railroad holdings. Santa Fe had holdings in gold mines in California and Nevada, and owned part of oil and gas complex in California valued at close to $2 billion. Southern Pacific owned more California real estate than any other corporation, with huge amounts of forest land and prime urban property including 200 acres in Downtown San Francisco and more than 150 acres near Disneyland, estimated to be worth as much as $5 billion.

The Justice Department and competing railroads strongly criticized the merger, but industry analysts largely expected the deal to be approved. In an argument for the merger, John J. Schmidt, the head of Santa Fe Southern Pacific, said in testimony in front of the ICC board that since 1982 Southern Pacific had either lost money or made very little profit each year, and suggested that Santa Fe was not financially healthy enough to survive independently. After the testimony, ICC staff recommended to the board that the merger be approved, with some conditions that he said the staff believed would solve the competition problem.

The company was stunned on July 24, 1986, when the ICC board rejected the proposed merger, saying that the anti-competitive problems outweighed the public benefits of joining the rail systems. Specifically, in the 4-1 decision, the ICC cited that the railroads had extensive parallel operations in California and across the Southwest, and that merging the lines would have a “substantial adverse effect” on competition.

The company quickly moved to strike a deal with competitor Union Pacific to grant them rights to use some of the Santa Fe and Southern Pacific tracks. The company also started the process of selling off some of its non-railroad businesses. After those changes, on December 9, 1986, the company appealed the ICC decision. On April 20, 1987, Santa Fe Southern Pacific Chairman and CEO John J. Schmidt resigned under pressure, reportedly ousted by the company's board of directors who were displeased with the way the merger was handled.

Ultimately, despite the changes, on June 30, 1987, the ICC declined to reconsider the merger and ordered the company to sell one or both of the rail lines within two years.

Southern Pacific was sold to Rio Grande Industries for US$1.02 billion in October 1988, the companies California real estate holdings were spun off into a new company called Catellus Development Corporation which would become the State's largest private landowner, and the former holding company would rename itself Santa Fe Pacific Corporation and retain the Santa Fe Railroad and the remaining non-railroad businesses of both predecessors.

In 1995, the Santa Fe railroad merged with Burlington Northern to form BNSF Railway, and the Southern Pacific was acquired by the Union Pacific Corporation the following year.

== "Kodachrome" paint scheme ==
The Santa Fe Southern Pacific Corporation was so confident the merger would be approved, the company began repainting their locomotives into a new unified paint scheme that would allow the future railroad to be called the SPSF Railway. Because the railroads were legally required to operate separately, the paint scheme included the letters SP or SF and an adjacent empty space where the other two letters could be added after the merger was approved.

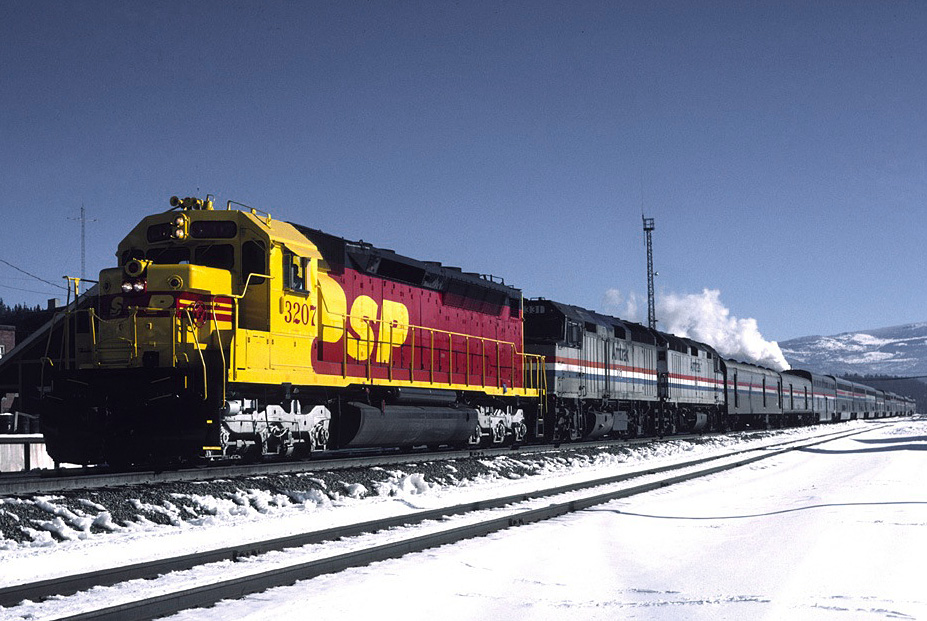
SP 3207 in the Kodachrome scheme, January 1986. Note the room on the right to add SF.

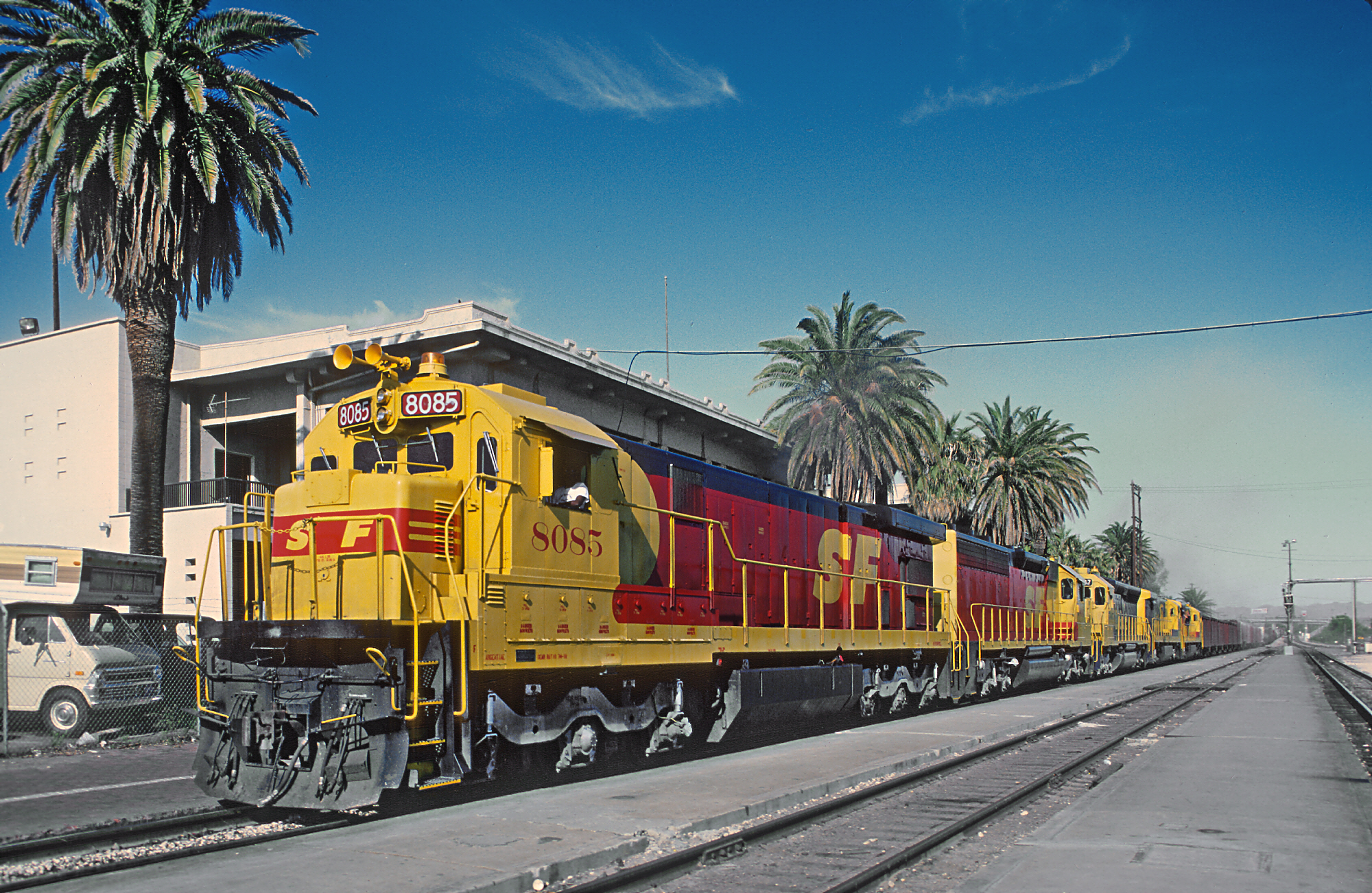
AT&SF 8085 in the Kodachrome scheme, April 1987. Note the room on the left to add SP.

The locomotive livery was based on the Santa Fe's Yellowbonnet with a red stripe on the locomotive's nose; the remainder of the locomotive body was painted in Southern Pacific's scarlet red (from their Bloody Nose scheme) with a black roof and black extending down to the lower part of the locomotive's radiator grills. The number boards were red with white numbers. In large block letters within the red portion of the sides was either "SP" (for Southern Pacific-owned locomotives) or "SF" (for Santa Fe-owned locomotives).

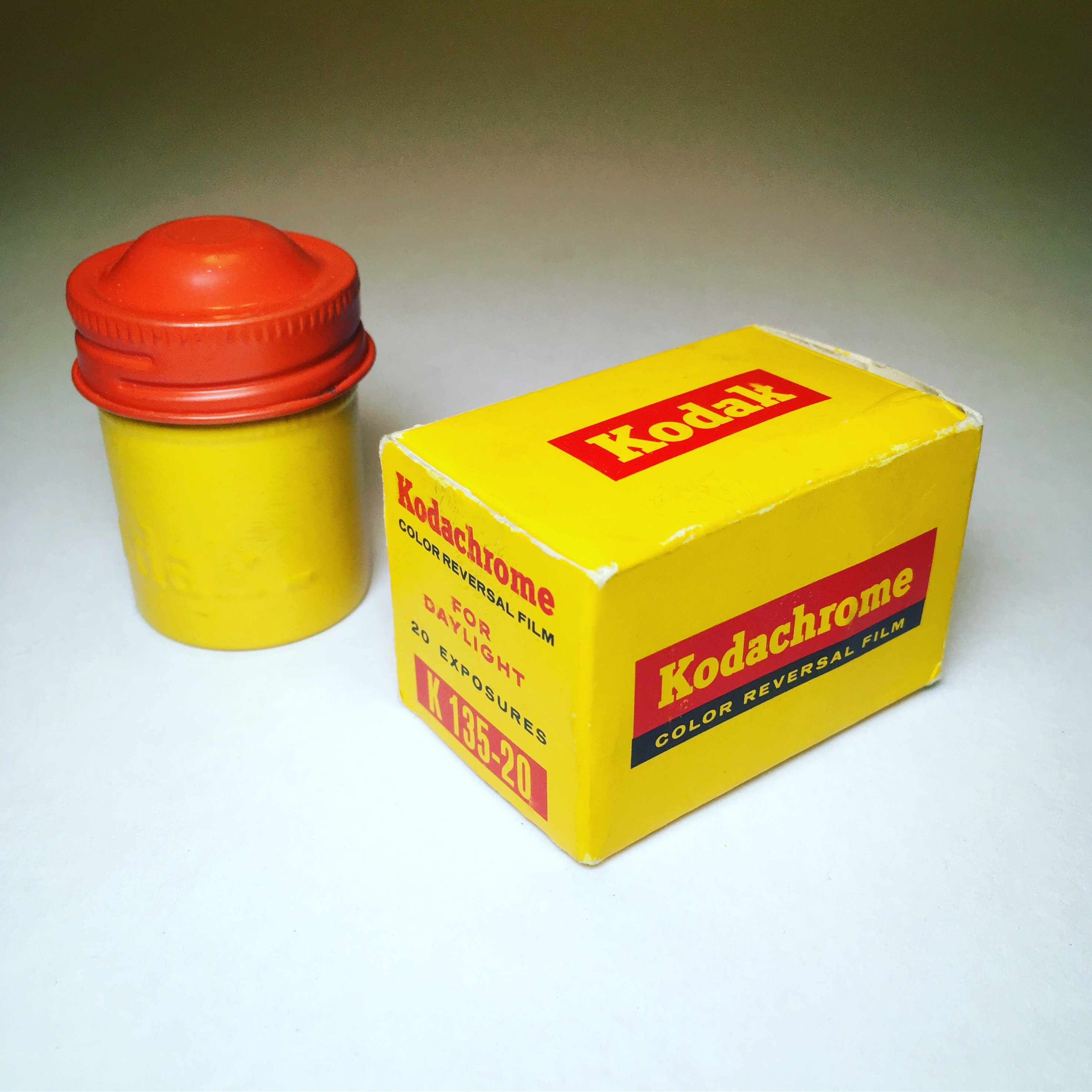
Kodachrome film packaging had similar colors to the merger paint scheme.

This paint scheme, combining yellow, red and black, has come to be called the Kodachrome paint scheme due to the colors' resemblance to those on the boxes that Kodak used to package its Kodachrome slide film (which was heavily used by railfans of the time). After the ICC's denial, railroad industry writers, employees of both railroads and railfans alike joked that SPSF really stood for "Shouldn't Paint So Fast".

The lettering was positioned on the locomotive sides so that the other half of the lettering could be added after the merger became official. Two ATSF EMD SD45-2s (ATSF #7219 and #7221) were painted with the full SPSF lettering to show what the unified paint scheme would look like after the merger was complete. One Santa Fe caboose was also painted with "SPSF" in a similar situation.

At the time of merger denial, approximately 306 ATSF locomotives, four ATSF cabooses, 10 ATSF slugs, 96 SP locomotives, and one SP caboose had been painted in this fashion. The two railroads made an effort to repaint locomotives in their standard paint schemes after the merger was denied. Santa Fe repainted all Kodachromes still on roster by 1990, while Southern Pacific's less numerous Kodachromes were repainted much more slowly; some remained active on the Union Pacific after the SP buyout.

SP #2873, an EMD GP9R in the Kodachrome scheme is preserved and operational the Western Pacific Railroad Museum in Portola, California. Trona Railway #2003, an EMD SD40R (ex. SP SD40R #7357, SD40 #8421), is still active on the TRC roster in its Kodachrome scheme as of August 2026, albeit faded. It is awaiting disposition as a result of the TRC downsizing their roster as of May 2026. Former ATSF EMD F45 #5989 was used as a test bed by MotivePower Inc. until 2021, when it was acquired by Dieselmotive Company. The locomotive is set to be restored to its Kodachrome scheme with hopes that it will be eventually sent to a museum.
