= Voting trust =

A voting trust is an arrangement whereby the shares in a company of one or more shareholders and the voting rights attached thereto are legally transferred to a trustee, usually for a specified period of time (the "trust period"). In some voting trusts, the trustee may also be granted additional powers (such as to sell or redeem the shares). At the end of the trust period, the shares would ordinarily be re-transferred to the beneficiary, although in practice many voting trusts contain provisions for them to re-vested on the voting trusts with identical terms.

Voting trusts were made popular in Delaware corporate law, but they have since been adopted widely by other states in the United States. They have also been extensively adopted in offshore jurisdictions.

== Purposes ==
Some advantages to a voting trust include:

- Several shareholders may wish to create a unified block of votes, which together gives them more power than the collective sum of their fragmented interests.
- In many countries, to call general meetings, shareholders need to hold a certain percentage of the issued shares of the company. By aggregating their shares, the shareholders can confer this power on themselves collectively where they might not have it individually.
- Locking shares in voting trusts can, in some countries, help deter a hostile takeover.
- Voting trusts are sometimes used to resolve conflicts of interest. By putting the shares in a trustee who can vote them at arm's length from the beneficiary(ies) of the trust, this can in some circumstances mitigate or absolve the original shareholder from what might otherwise constitute a conflict of interest (although in practice, to resolve conflicts of interest the trust will ordinarily be ac"blind trust"; while all blind trusts are necessarily voting trusts, not all voting trusts are blind trusts).
- Shares are sometimes aggregated into a voting trust to facilitate a corporate reorganization.
- Promoters of companies sometimes aggregate their shares in a voting trust to safeguard control of the company.

== Sample ==
Sample Voting trust agreement
