= Santa Fe Pacific Corporation =

Defunct American railway company

- Industry: Railroad industry
- Predecessors: Santa Fe Industries; Southern Pacific Company
- Founded: December 23, 1983
- Defunct: September 22, 1995
- Successor: Burlington Northern Santa Fe Corporation
- Headquarters: Chicago (founded); Schaumburg, Illinois, United States
- Website: Santa Fe Pacific Corporation history summary

The Santa Fe Pacific Corporation was formed as the Santa Fe Southern Pacific Corporation on December 23, 1983 by the merger of Santa Fe Industries, which owned the Atchison, Topeka and Santa Fe Railway, with the Southern Pacific Company, which owned the Southern Pacific Railroad.

Santa Fe Southern Pacific sold its 520,000 acres of northern California timberland to Sierra Pacific Industries in 1987.

After the Interstate Commerce Commission denied their plan to merge their railroads as the Southern Pacific Santa Fe Railroad, the holding company name was shortened, and the Southern Pacific Railroad sold.

The holding company retained all the non-rail interests of both predecessors; these were mainly real estate and natural resources, but Southern Pacific had also formed the telephone company known as Sprint, which was sold shortly before the merger. It was initially headquartered in Chicago and later in Schaumburg, Illinois. Former Southern Pacific executive Robert Krebs succeeded Santa Fe head John J. Schmidt as CEO.

Almost immediately after the Southern Pacific was sold, Santa Fe Pacific issued a massive dividend. It was so large that it was considered a return of capital, and financed by issuing a large amount of debt. A few years after that, they spun off most of the company's natural resources interests as Santa Fe Pacific Corporation. They also spun off all their non-track real estate interests, including railway stations, as Catellus Development.

In September 1995 what was left of the company merged into Burlington Northern. The Santa Fe railroad became part of the Burlington Northern Santa Fe. Robert Krebs was CEO of the merged company, until his retirement.

The Santa Fe Pacific Corporation was not related to the Santa Fe Pacific Railroad, which operated from 1897 to 1902.
