= Northern Pacific Railway =

Defunct transcontinental railroad company in the northwest United States (1864-1970)

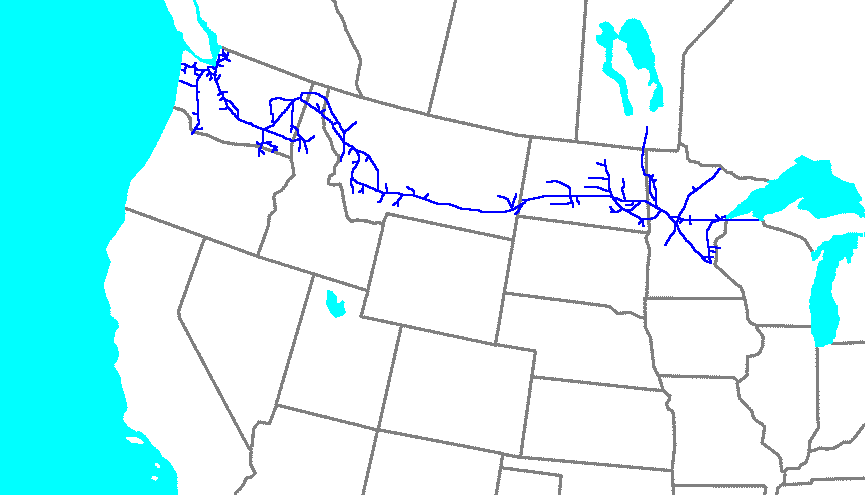
- The Northern Pacific Railway system map

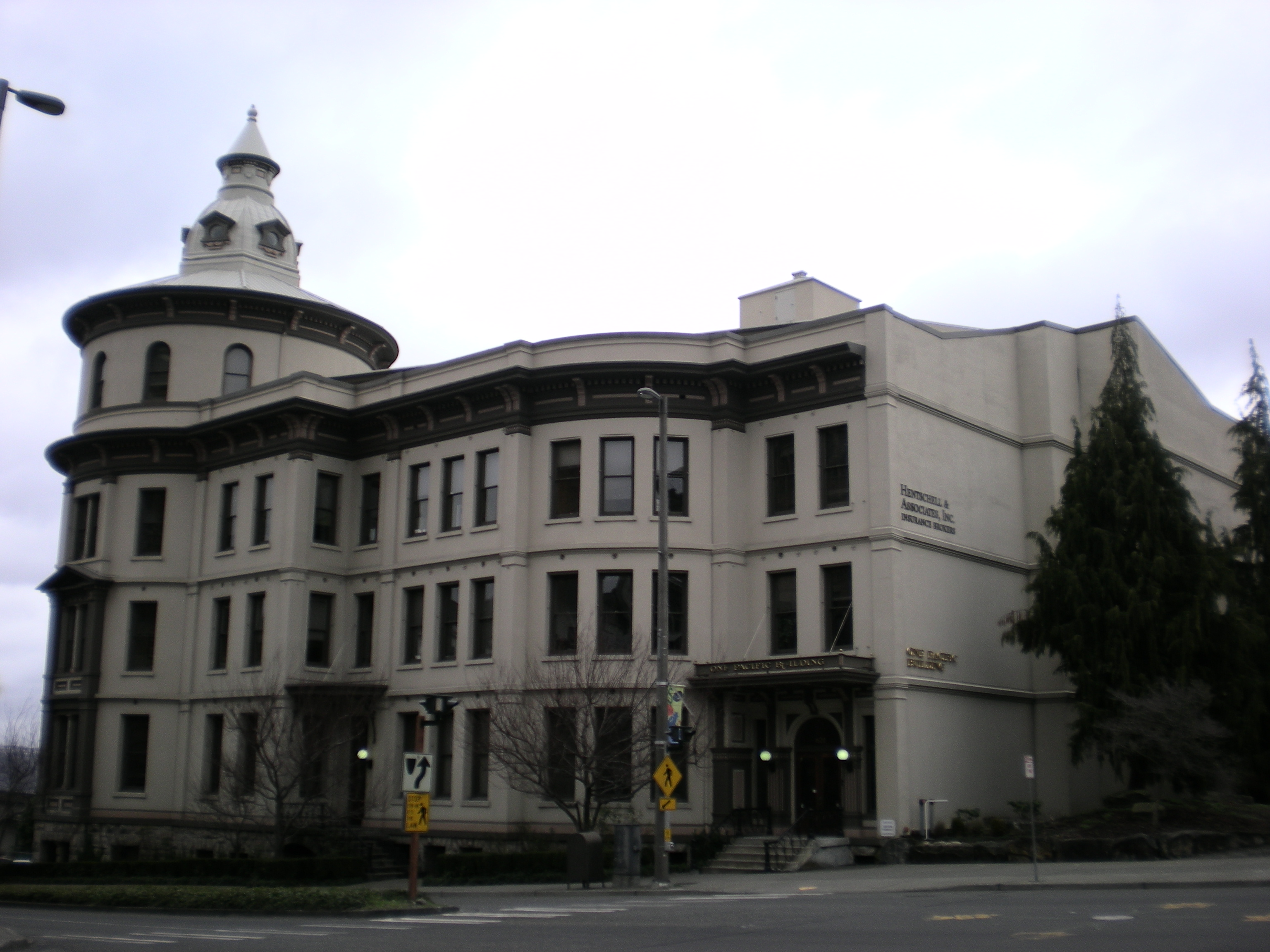
- The former Northern Pacific Office Building in Tacoma, Washington

Overview
- Headquarters: Saint Paul, Minnesota
- Key people: J. Gregory Smith, President (1865–1872); Henry Villard, President & primary financier (1881–1884); Adna Anderson, Chief Engineer (1880–1888)
- Founder: Josiah Perham
- Reporting mark: NP
- Locale: Ashland, Wisconsin and Saint Paul, Minnesota to Seattle, Washington, Tacoma, Washington, and Portland, Oregon
- Dates of operation: 1864–1970
- Successor: Burlington Northern (later BNSF)

Technical
- Track gauge: 4 ft 8 1/2 in (1,435 mm) standard gauge

The Northern Pacific Railway (reporting mark NP) was an important American transcontinental railroad that operated across the northern tier of the Western United States, from Minnesota to the Pacific Northwest between 1864 and 1970. It was approved and chartered by the 38th Congress of the United States in the national / federal capital of Washington, D.C., during the last years of the American Civil War (1861–1865), and received nearly 40 million acres (62,000 sq mi; 160,000 km^{2}) of adjacent land grants, which it used to raise additional money in Europe (especially in Northern Pacific president Henry Villard's home country of the new German Empire), for construction funding.

Construction began in 1870, and the main line had opened all the way from the Great Lakes to the Pacific Ocean, just south of the Canada–United States border, when Ulysses S. Grant drove in the final "golden spike" completing the line in western Montana Territory, on September 8, 1883. The railroad had about 6,800 miles (10,900 km) of track and served a large area, including extensive trackage in the western Federal territories and later states of Idaho, Minnesota, Montana, North Dakota, Oregon, Washington, and Wisconsin. In addition, the N.P. had an international branch, Northern Pacific and Manitoba Railway (formed 1888), running north to Winnipeg, capital of the province of Manitoba, in the newly organized Canada. The main activities were shipping wheat and other farm products, cattle, timber, and minerals; bringing in consumer goods, transporting passengers; and selling land. This joint venture ended in 1899 and remaining Canadian trackage and Winnipeg East Yard acquired by the Canadian Northern Railway in 1901.

The Northern Pacific was headquartered in Minnesota, first in Brainerd, then in the state capital of Saint Paul. It had a tumultuous financial history; the N.P. merged with other lines over a century later in 1970 to form the modern Burlington Northern Railroad, which in turn merged with the famous Atchison, Topeka and Santa Fe Railway to become the renamed BNSF Railway in 1996, operating in the western U.S.

== History ==
=== Organization ===
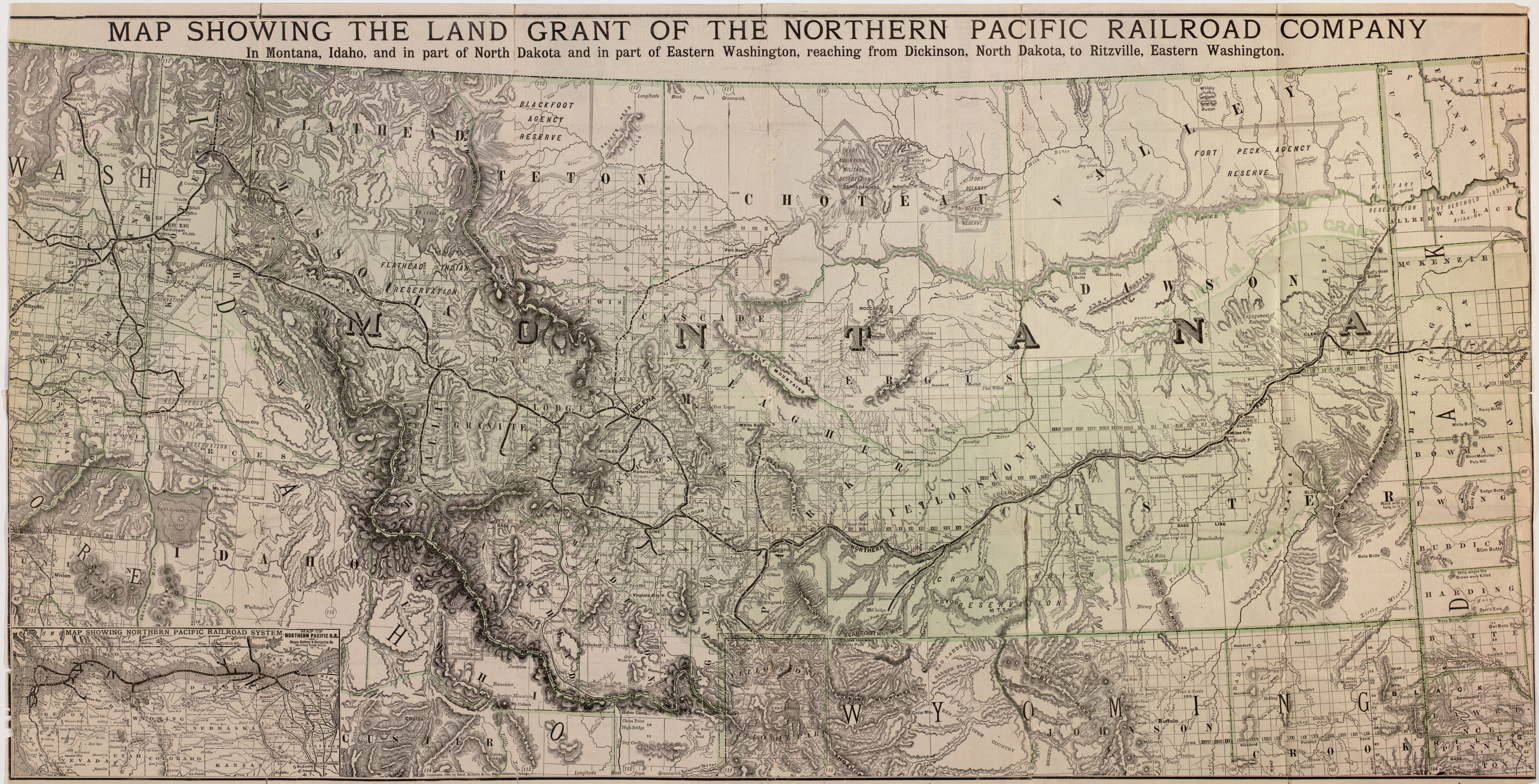
Map of NPR Land Grant, c1890

The 38th United States Congress chartered the Northern Pacific Railway Company on July 2, 1864, with the goals of connecting the Great Lakes with Puget Sound on the northwestern coast of the United States on the Pacific Ocean, opening vast new lands for farming, ranching, lumbering and mining, and linking the federal territory of Washington and state of Oregon to the rest of the country (plus connecting the northern Great Plains of central Canada to the northern states of the U.S. and especially its Midwestern big cities, manufacturing centers and markets.

The U.S. Congress granted the Northern Pacific Railroad a generous potential bonanza of 60 million acres (94,000 sq mi; 240,000 km^{2}) of land adjacent to the line in exchange for building rail transportation to an undeveloped western territory. Josiah Perham was elected its first president on December 7, 1864. It could not use all the land and in the end accepted just under 40 million acres of the allotment.

=== Jay Cooke takes control ===
For the next six years, backers of the road struggled to find financing. Though John Gregory Smith, succeeded Perham as second president on January 5, 1865, groundbreaking did not take place until February 15, 1870, at Carlton, Minnesota, 25 miles (40 km) west of Duluth (on Lake Superior, the westernmost port of the Great Lakes). The backing and promotions of famed New York City / Wall Street financier Jay Cooke, in the summer of 1870 brought the first real momentum to the railway company.

Over the course of 1871, the Northern Pacific pushed westward from Minnesota into the Dakota Territory (in the present-day state of North Dakota). Surveyors and construction crews had to maneuver through swamps, bogs, and tamarack forests. The difficult terrain and insufficient funding delayed by six months the construction phase in Minnesota. The N.P. also began building its line north from Kalama, Washington Territory, on the Columbia River just outside of Portland, Oregon, towards the Puget Sound. Four small construction locomotive engines were purchased, the Minnetonka, Itaska, Ottertail and St. Cloud, the first of which was transported via ship to Kalama around Cape Horn. In Minnesota, the Lake Superior and Mississippi Railroad completed construction of its 155-mile (249 km) line stretching from Saint Paul east to Lake Superior at Duluth in 1870. It was leased to the Northern Pacific line in 1876 and was eventually absorbed by the Northern Pacific. The famed North Coast Limited was the Northern Pacific's flagship passenger train, and the railroad itself was built along the trail blazed by the Lewis and Clark expedition exploring the new Louisiana Purchase and the further American West in 1804 and 1805.

The Northern Pacific reached Fargo, Dakota Territory (now North Dakota) on the border between Dakota Territory and Minnesota early in June 1872. The following year, in June 1873, the N.P. reached the shores of the upper Missouri River at Edwinton, Dakota Territory (now Bismarck, the state capital of North Dakota). In the west sector, the N.P. track extended 25 miles (40 km) north from Kalama. Surveys were carried out in the Dakota Territory protected by 600 troops of the horse cavalry of the United States Army, under command of Civil War hero General Winfield Scott Hancock.

Fabricating shops and foundries were established in Brainerd, Minnesota, a town named by the N.P. second President John Gregory Smith for his father-in-law, Lawrence Brainerd, a close friend and colleague. The Railway also established its first temporary offices and headquarters there. A severe stock market crash and financial collapse in the East after 1873, led by the Credit Mobilier Scandal and the Union Pacific Railroad stock fraud, caused a nationwide economic recession and financial panic in New York City's Wall Street financial district, stopping further railroad building for twelve years during the latter 1870s and early 1880s.

In 1886, the company restarted and put down 164 miles (264 km) of main line across the northern Dakotas, with an additional 45 miles (72 km) from the west in Washington Territory. On November 1, former U.S. Army general George Washington Cass, became the third president of the company. Cass had been a vice-president and on the board of directors of the Pennsylvania Railroad, one of the dominant Eastern lines, and would lead the Northern Pacific through some of its most difficult times in the later 19th century.

Attacks on survey parties and construction crews as they approached the Yellowstone region by Sioux, Cheyenne, Arapaho, and Kiowa native warriors in northern Dakota and Minnesota Territories became so prevalent that the company received protection from U.S. cavalry.

=== Settlement ===
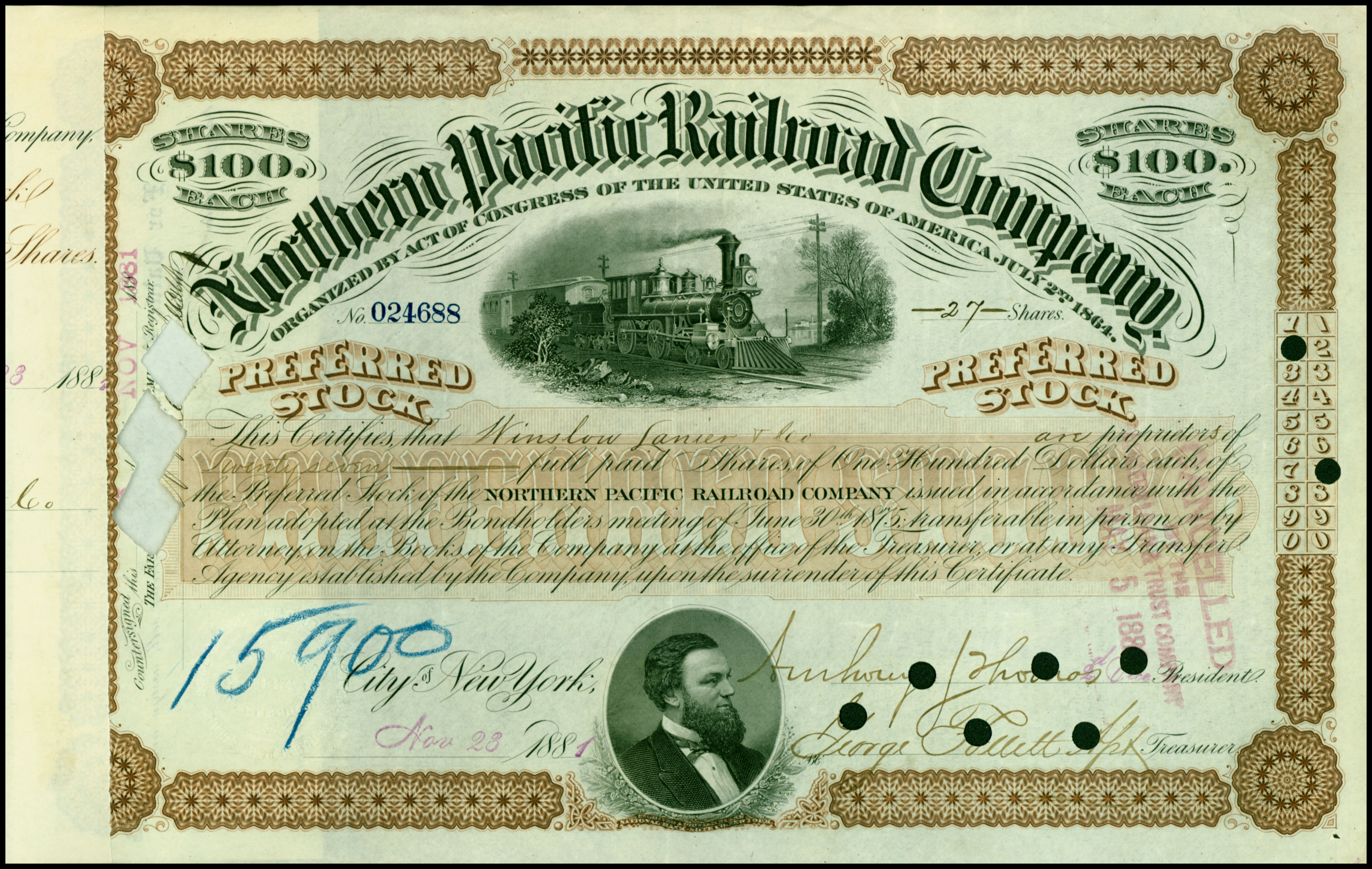
Preferred Shares of the Northern Pacific Railroad Company, stock certificate issued 28 November 1881

In 1886, the Northern Pacific also opened colonization / emigration offices in Europe especially the newly unified German Empire and north to the kingdoms of Scandinavia, with good reliable steamship lines, attracting Nordic farmers with package deals of cheap land and transportation and purchase deals in the similar cold higher latitudes of climate of the north-central North America continent, but with richer unplowed expansive soil. The success of the N.P. was based on the abundant crops of wheat and other grains already grown and the attraction to settlers of the lower Red River Valley of the Red River of the North, Minnesota, Missouri and Mississippi Rivers basins along the Minnesota-Dakota border in the decade between 1881 and 1890.

The Northern Pacific reached Dakota Territory at Fargo in 1872 and began its career as one of the central factors in the economic growth of Dakota Territory and later its twin states North and South. The climate, although very cold in the continental interior heartland was still suitable for wheat, which was in high demand in the eastern and Mid-Western rapidly developing industrial cities of the United States and even growing exports overseas to Europe. Most of the settlers were German and Scandinavian immigrants who bought the land cheaply and raised large families. They shipped huge quantities of wheat to Minneapolis, then Milwaukee, Chicago and St. Louis connected by rail. while buying all sorts of farming equipment and home supplies (some ordered and delivered through the beginnings of published mail-order catalogs from the big cities warehouses, to be shipped in by rail.

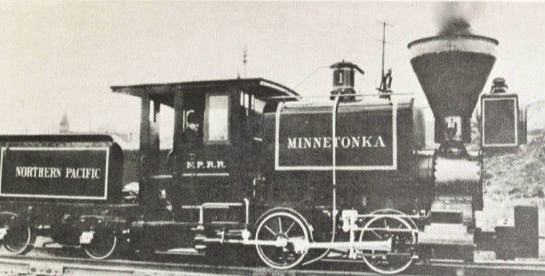
The Minnetonka

The N.P. used its federal land grants as security to borrow money to build its system. The federal government kept every other alternate section of land, and gave it away free to native and immigrant homesteaders / farmers under the Homestead Act of 1862. At first the railroad sold much of its holdings at low prices to land speculators in order to realize quick cash profits, and also to eliminate sizable annual tax bills. By 1905, the railroad company's land policies changed, after it was judged a costly mistake to have sold much of the land at wholesale prices. With better railroad service and improved more educated and scientific methods of farming and soil conservation in future decades in the special unique conditions on the Great Plains. The Northern Pacific then easily sold what had been heretofore termed "worthless" land directly to farmers at good prices. By 1910 the railroad's holdings in the new state of North Dakota had been greatly reduced.

=== Panic of 1873 and first bankruptcy ===
In 1873, Northern Pacific made impressive strides before a terrible stumble. Rails from the east reached the Missouri River on June 4. After several years of study, Tacoma, Washington Territory near the Pacific Coast and Puget Sound for waterborne shipping port facilities was selected as the road's western terminus on July 14, 1873.

For the previous three years the financial house of Jay Cooke and Company in New York City had been throwing money into the construction of the Northern Pacific. As with many western transcontinentals, the staggering costs of building a railroad into a vast wilderness prairie had been drastically underestimated. Cooke had little success in marketing the N.P.R.R. bonds in Europe and overextended his house in meeting overdrafts of the mounting construction costs. Cooke overestimated his managerial skills and failed to appreciate the limits of a banker's ability to be also a promoter, and the danger of freezing his assets in the bonds of the Northern Pacific. Cooke and Company went bankrupt on September 18, 1873. Soon the financial Panic of 1873 engulfed the United States, business and financial community extending to numerous industries beginning an economic depression that was one of the worst in American history prior to the infamous Great Depression of the 1930s, sixty years into the future. The downturn ruined or nearly paralyzed newer railroads throughout the country.

The Northern Pacific however luckily survived bankruptcy that year, due to austerity measures put in place by President Cass. In fact, working with last-minute loans from Director John C. Ainsworth of Portland, the Northern Pacific still completed the line north along the Pacific Ocean and U.S. west coast from Kalama to Tacoma, a distance of 110 miles (180 km), before the end of 1873. On December 16, the first steam locomotive train arrived in Tacoma. But by the next year in 1874 the company was approaching insolvency.

Northern Pacific slipped into its first bankruptcy on June 30, 1875. President Cass resigned to become the court-appointed receiver of the company, and Charles Barstow Wright became its fourth president. Frederick Billings, namesake of future Billings, Montana, formulated a reorganization plan which was put into effect.

Throughout 1874 to 1876, elements of the 7th Cavalry Regiment of the U.S. Army under the command of Lieutenant Colonel George Armstrong Custer, operating out of Fort Abraham Lincoln and Fort Rice in the Dakota Territory, conducted expeditions to protect the railroad survey and construction crews in Dakota and Montana Territories.

=== Frederick Billings and the first reorganization ===
In 1877, construction resumed in a small way. Northern Pacific pushed a branch line southeast from Tacoma to Puyallup, Washington and on to the coal fields around Wilkeson, Washington. Much of the coal was destined for export through Tacoma to San Francisco, California, where it would be thrown into the fireboxes of Central Pacific Railroad's steam locomotives.

This small amount of construction was one of the largest projects the company would undertake in the years between 1874 and 1880. That same year the company built a large shop complex at Edison, Washington (now part of south Tacoma metropolitan area). The Edison Shops became the largest on the system for building and repairing freight cars due to the easy access of cheap lumber. The Brainerd Shops to the east remained as the largest locomotive repair facility throughout the steam era. Another shops / foundry site was located at the center mid-way of the mainline in Livingston, Montana, which became the primary diesel engine maintenance facility after 1955. In St. Paul, Minnesota were the Como Shops, which maintained most of the passenger car fleet, and the Gladstone Shops, which closed in 1915.

On May 24, 1879, Frederick H. Billings became the fifth president of the company. Billings' tenure would be short but ferocious. Reorganization, bond sales, and improvement in the U.S. economy allowed Northern Pacific to strike out across the upper Missouri River by letting a contract to build 100 miles (160 km) of railroad west of the river. The railroad's new-found strength, however, would be seen as a threat in certain quarters.

=== Henry Villard and the Last Spike ===
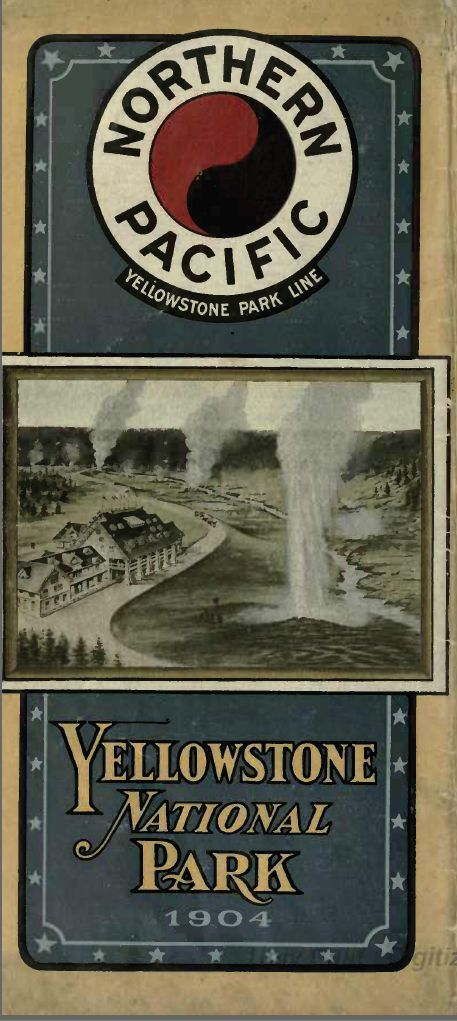
Yellowstone National Park's N.P.R.R.-Yellowstone Park Line brochure, 1904

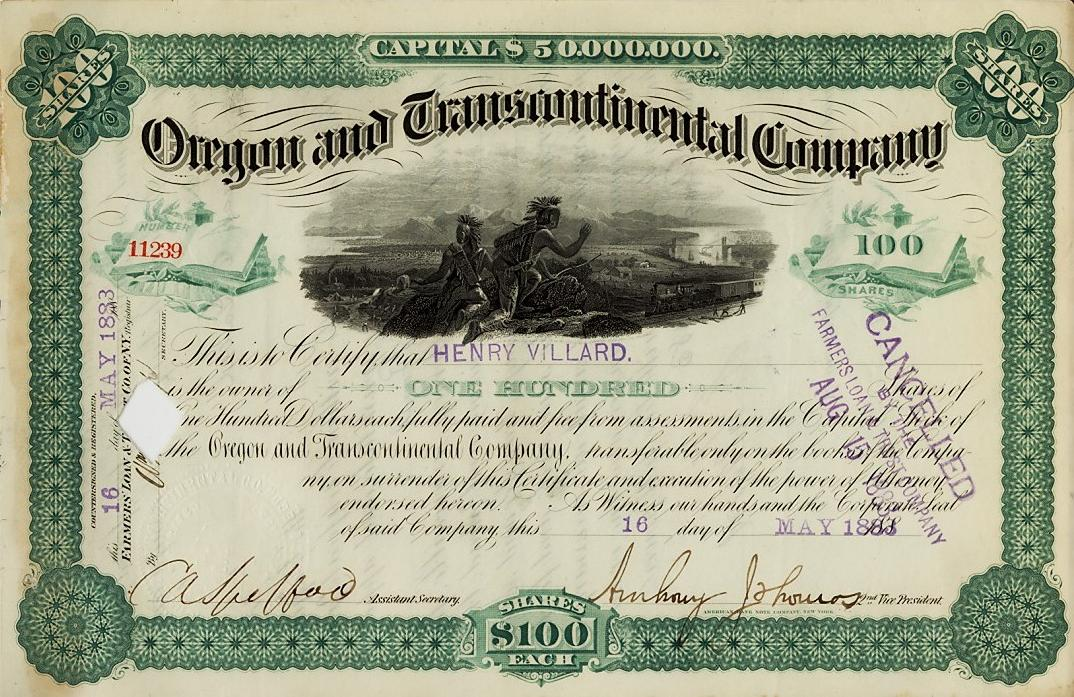
Oregon and Transcontinental Company stock certificate owned by 6th N.P.R.R. president, 1881-1884 Henry Villard.

German-born former war correspondent / journalist and later newspaper / magazine publisher Henry Villard (6th President N.P.R.R. 1881-1884), had raised capital for western railroads in Europe (especially in the recently unified German Empire), from 1871 to 1873. After returning to New York City in 1874, he invested on behalf of his clients in railroads in Oregon. Through Villard's work, most of these lines became properties of the European creditors' holding company, the Oregon and Transcontinental Company.

Of the lines held by the Oregon and Transcontinental, the most important was the Oregon Railway and Navigation Company, which ran east from Portland, Oregon along the left bank of the Columbia River to a connection with the Union Pacific Railroad's Oregon Short Line at the confluence of the Columbia River and the Snake River near Wallula, Washington. The Union Pacific and Central Pacific lines had completed the first trans-continental route 12 years earlier in 1869.

Within a decade of his return, Villard was head of a transportation empire in the Pacific Northwest that had but one real competitor, the Northern Pacific Railroad. The Northern Pacific's trans-continental route completion threatened the holdings of Villard in the Northwest, and especially in Portland. Portland unfortunately could possibly become a second-class city if the Puget Sound's deeper and larger ports at Tacoma and nearby Seattle, Washington, were further developed and connected to the East by rail.

Villard, who had been building a monopoly of river and rail transportation in Oregon for several years, now launched a daring raid. Using his European connections and a reputation for having "bested" Jay Gould in a battle for control of the Kansas Pacific Railroad years before, Villard solicited and raised $8 million from his associates. This was his famous "Blind Pool"; Villard's associates were not told what the money would be used for. In this case, he used the funds to purchase control of the Northern Pacific.

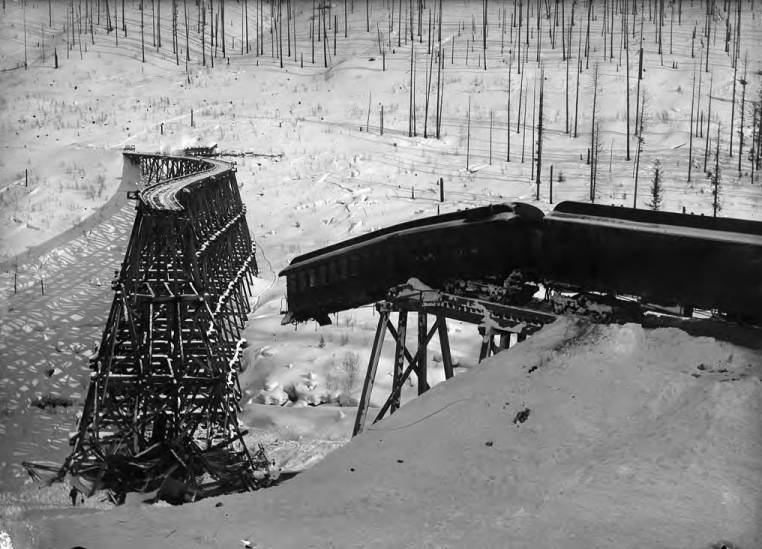
A Northern Pacific train derailment on the S-curve trestle of the Coeur d'Alene cutoff near Mullan, Idaho (1903)

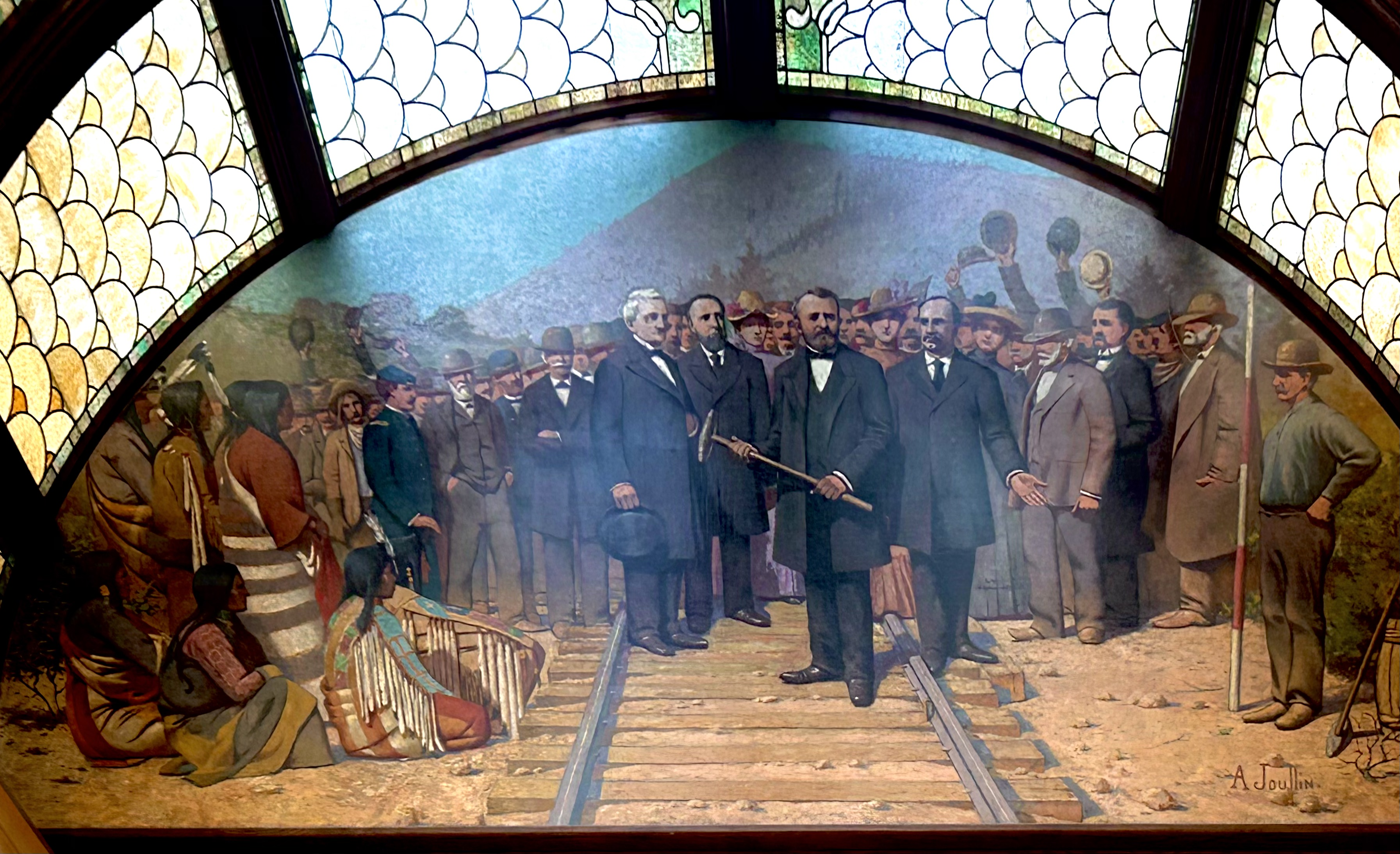
Amédée Joullin, Driving the Golden Spike, (1903). Oil on canvas painting commemorating the “golden spike” driven uniting the east and west sections completing the Northern Pacific Railroad route after 13 years near Gold Creek, Montana in 1883

Despite a tough fight, Billings and his backers were forced to capitulate; he resigned the presidency June 9, 1881. Ashbel H. Barney, former President of Wells Fargo & Company (bankers and famous Western stagecoach line), served briefly as interim caretaker of the railroad from June 19 to September 15, when Villard was elected sixth president by the stockholders. For the next two years, Villard and the Northern Pacific rode the whirlwind.

In 1882, 360 miles (580 km) of main line and 368 miles (592 km) of branch line were completed, bringing totals to 1,347 miles (2,168 km) and 731 miles (1,176 km), respectively. On October 10, 1882, the line from Wadena, Minnesota, to Fergus Falls, Minnesota, opened for service. The upper Missouri River was bridged with a million-dollar span on October 21, 1883. Until then, crossing of the Missouri had had to be managed with a ferry boat service for most of the year; in winter, when ice was thick enough, rails were laid across the river itself.

Former Union Army General Herman Haupt, another veteran of the Civil War, builder then of the wartime United States Military Railroad lines and the civilian Pennsylvania Railroad, organized the Northern Pacific Beneficial Association in 1881. Inspired by the progressive medical care and insurance program then being introduced in the German Empire in Europe and a forerunner of the modern health maintenance organization, the N.P.B.A. ultimately established a series of four medical hospitals across the N.P.R.R. route system in Saint Paul, Minnesota; Glendive, Montana; Missoula, Montana; and Tacoma, Washington, to care for its railroad employees, retirees, and their families.

On January 15, 1883, the first N.P.R.R. train reached Livingston, Montana, at the eastern foot of the Bozeman Pass. Livingston, like Brainerd and South Tacoma before it, would grow to encompass a large backshop handling heavy repairs for the Northern Pacific Railroad equipment. It would also mark the east–west dividing line on the Northern Pacific route system.

Villard pushed hard for the completion of the Northern Pacific in 1883. His crews laid an average of a mile and half (2.4 km) of track each day. The track was technically completed on August 22. But to celebrate, and gain national publicity for investment opportunities in his region, Villard chartered four trains from the East and one train from the West to carry about 300 people for an official "Golden Spike" Ceremony at Independence Creek, a few miles east of the station at Gold Creek in Montana Territory. No expense was spared, and the list of guests included former President Ulysses S. Grant, only two years before his tragic death from cancer, and Villard's in-laws, the family of famed longtime abolitionist William Lloyd Garrison, who had just died four years earlier. After tearing up a short section of track in anticipation of the ceremony and then laying it back down at the event on September 8, 1883, the ceremonial Last Spike was driven in.

=== Direct to the Puget Sound ===
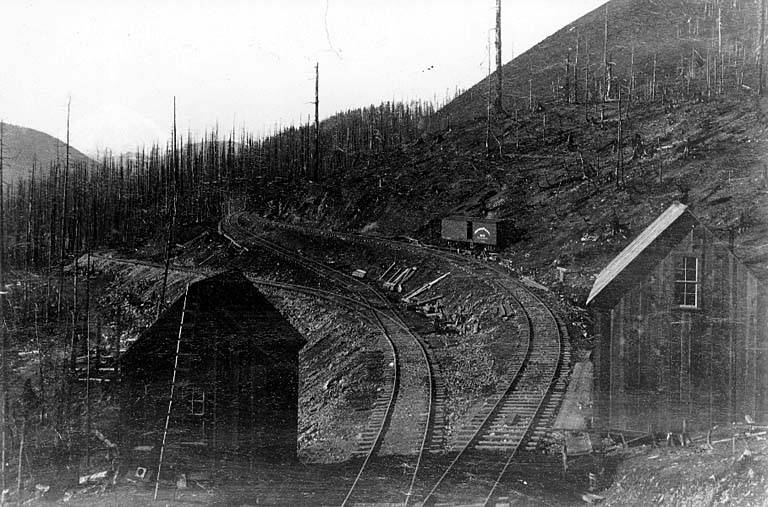
Early Northern Pacific switchbacks on Stampede Pass. (1887)

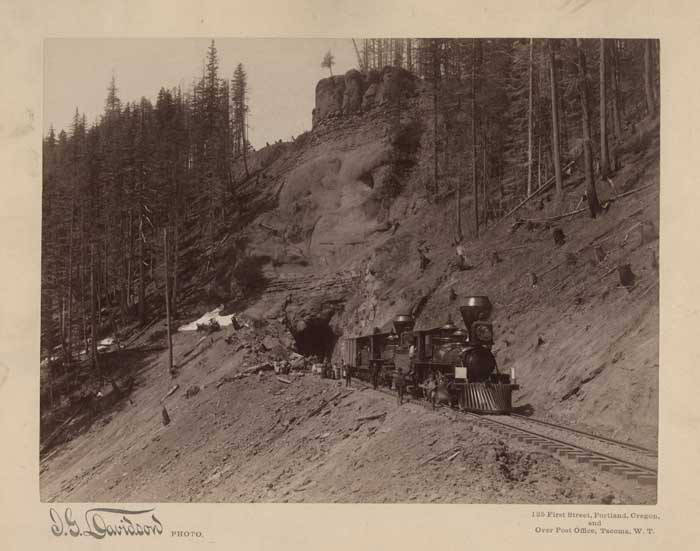
A Northern Pacific 4-4-0 on Stampede Pass. (1888)

Villard's fall was swifter than his ascendancy. Like Jay Cooke, he was now consumed by the enormous costs of constructing the railroad. Wall Street bears attacked the stock shortly after the Golden Spike, after the realization that the Northern Pacific was a very long road with very little business. Villard himself suffered a nervous breakdown in the days after the driving of the Golden Spike, and he left the presidency of the Northern Pacific in January 1884.

Again, the presidency of the Northern Pacific was handed to a professional railroader, Robert Harris, former head of the Chicago, Burlington and Quincy Railroad. For the next four years, until the return of the Villard group, Harris worked at improving the property and ending its tangled relationship with the Oregon Railway and Navigation Company.

Throughout the mid-1880s, the Northern Pacific pushed to reach Puget Sound directly, rather than by means of a roundabout route that followed the Columbia River. Surveys of the Cascade Mountains, carried out intermittently since the 1870s, began anew. Virgil Bogue, a veteran civil engineer, was sent to explore the Cascades again. On March 19, 1881, he discovered Stampede Pass. In 1883, John W. Sprague, the head of the new Pacific Division, drove the Golden Spike to mark the beginning of the railroad from what would become Kalama, Washington. He resigned months later due to impaired health.

In 1884, after the departure of Villard, the Northern Pacific began building toward Stampede Pass from Wallula in the east and the area of Wilkeson in the west. By the end of the year, rails had reached Yakima, Washington in the east. A 77-mile (124 km) gap remained in 1886.

In January of that year, Nelson Bennett was given a contract to construct a 9,850-foot (1.9 mi; 3.0 km) tunnel under Stampede Pass. The contract specified a short amount of time for completion, and a large penalty if the deadline were missed. While crews worked on the tunnel, the railroad built a temporary switchback route across the pass. With numerous timber trestles and grades which approached six percent, the temporary line required two M class 2-10-0s—the two largest locomotives in the world (at that time)—to handle a tiny five-car train. On May 3, 1888, crews holed through the tunnel, and on May 27 the first train passed through directly to Puget Sound.

=== Villard and the Panic of 1893 ===
Despite this success, the Northern Pacific, like many U.S. roads, was living on borrowed time. From 1887 until 1893, Henry Villard returned to the board of directors. Though offered the presidency, he refused. An associate of Villard dating back to his time on the Kansas Pacific, Thomas Fletcher Oakes, assumed the presidency on September 20, 1888.

In an effort to garner business, Oakes pursued an aggressive policy of branch line expansion. In addition, the Northern Pacific experienced the first competition in the form of James Jerome Hill and his Great Northern Railway. The Great Northern, like the Northern Pacific before it, was pushing west from the Twin Cities towards Puget Sound, and would be completed in 1893.

Mismanagement, sparse traffic, and the Panic of 1893 sounded the death knell for the Northern Pacific and Villard's interest in railroading. The company slipped into its second bankruptcy on October 20, 1893. Oakes was named receiver and Brayton Ives, a former chairman of the New York Stock Exchange, became president.

=== A railroad labor dispute ===
In 1894, the 10th Cavalry Regiment of the U.S. Army was involved in protecting property of the Northern Pacific Railroad from striking workers.

=== From Villard to Morganization ===
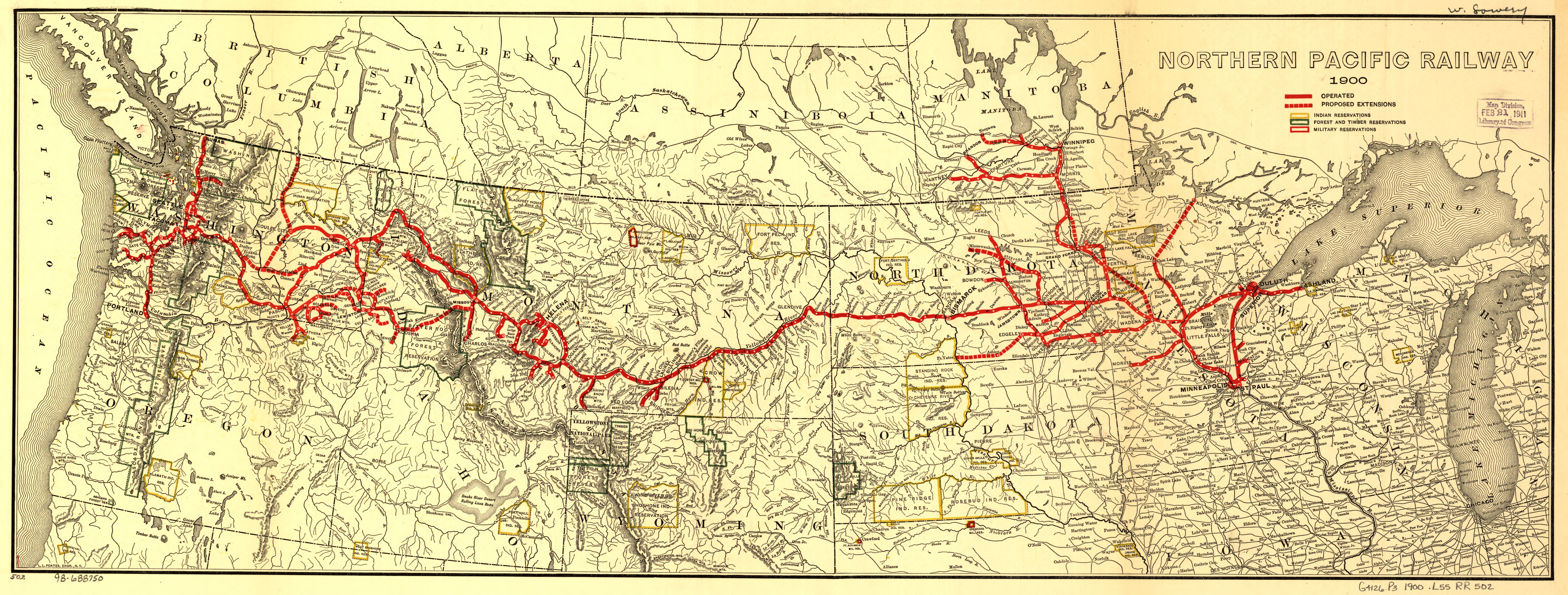
Map of Northern Pacific's route circa 1900.

For the next three years, the Villard-Oakes interests and the Ives interest feuded for control of the Northern Pacific. Oakes was eventually forced out as receiver, but not before three separate courts were claiming jurisdiction over the Northern Pacific's bankruptcy. Things came to a head in 1896, when first Edward Dean Adams was appointed president, then less than two months later, Edwin Winter.

Ultimately, the task of straightening out the muddle of the Northern Pacific was turned over to J. P. Morgan. Morganization of the Northern Pacific, a process which befell many U.S. roads in the wake of the Panic of 1893, was handed to Morgan lieutenant Charles Henry Coster. The new president, beginning September 1, 1897, was Charles Sanger Mellen.

Though James J. Hill had purchased an interest in the Northern Pacific during the troubled days of 1896, Coster and Mellen would advocate, and follow, a staunchly independent line for the Northern Pacific for the next four years. Only the early death of Coster from overwork, and the promotion of Mellen to head the Morgan-controlled New York, New Haven and Hartford Railroad in 1903, would bring the Northern Pacific closer to the orbit of James J. Hill.

=== Hill, Harriman and the Northern Pacific Corner ===
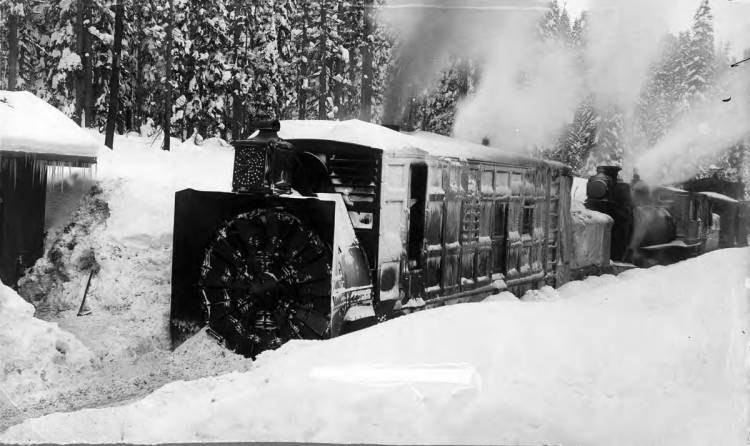
A Northern Pacific rotary plow on the Coeur d'Alene Cutoff near Mullan, Idaho. (1903)

In the late 1880s, the Villard regime, in another one of its costly missteps, attempted to stretch the Northern Pacific from the Twin Cities to the all-important rail hub of Chicago, Illinois. A costly project was begun in creating a union station and terminal facilities for a Northern Pacific which had yet to arrive.

Rather than build directly down to Chicago, perhaps following the Mississippi River as the Chicago, Burlington and Quincy had done, Villard chose to lease the Wisconsin Central. Some backers of the Wisconsin Central had long associations with Villard, and an expensive lease was worked out between the two companies which was only undone by the Northern Pacific's second bankruptcy.

The ultimate result was that the Northern Pacific was left without a direct connection to Chicago, the primary interchange point for most of the large U.S. railroads. Fortunately, the Northern Pacific was not alone. James J. Hill, controller of the Great Northern Railway, which was completed between the Twin Cities and Puget Sound in 1893, also lacked a direct connection to Chicago. Hill went looking for a road with an existing route between the Twin Cities and Chicago which could be rolled into his holdings and give him a stable path to that important interchange. At the same time, E. H. Harriman, head of the Union Pacific Railroad, was also looking for a road which could connect his company to Chicago.

The road both Harriman and Hill looked at was the Chicago, Burlington and Quincy. To Harriman, the Burlington was a road which paralleled much of his own and offered tantalizing direct access to Chicago. For Hill as well, there was the possibility of a high-speed link directly with Chicago. Though the Burlington did not parallel the Great Northern or the Northern Pacific, it would give them a powerful railroad in the central West. Harriman was the first to approach the Burlington's aging leader, the irascible Charles Elliott Perkins. The price for control of the Burlington, as set by Perkins, was $200 a share, more than Harriman was willing to pay. Hill met the price, and control of the Burlington was divided equally at about 48.5 percent each between the Great Northern and the Northern Pacific.

Not to be outdone, Harriman now came up with a crafty plan: buy a controlling interest in the Northern Pacific and use its power on the Burlington to place friendly directors upon its board. On May 3, 1901, Harriman began his stock raid which would become known as the Northern Pacific Corner. By the end of the day, he was short just 40,000 shares of common stock. Harriman placed an order to cover this, but was overridden by his broker, Jacob Schiff, of Kuhn, Loeb & Co. Hill, on the other hand, reached the vacationing Morgan in Italy and managed to place an order for 150,000 shares of common stock. Though Harriman might be able to control the preferred stock, Hill knew the company bylaws allowed for the holders of the common stock to vote to retire the preferred.

In three days, the Harriman-Hill imbroglio managed to wreak havoc on the stock market. Northern Pacific stock was quoted at $150 a share on May 6 and is reported to have traded as much as $1,000 a share behind the scenes. Harriman and Hill now worked to settle the issue for brokers to avoid panic. Hill, for his part, attempted to avoid future stock raids by placing his holdings in the Northern Securities Company, a move which would be undone by the Supreme Court in 1904 under the auspices of the Sherman Anti-Trust Act. Harriman was not immune either; he was forced to break up his holdings in the Union Pacific Railroad and the Southern Pacific Railroad a few years later.

=== From Hill to Howard Elliott ===
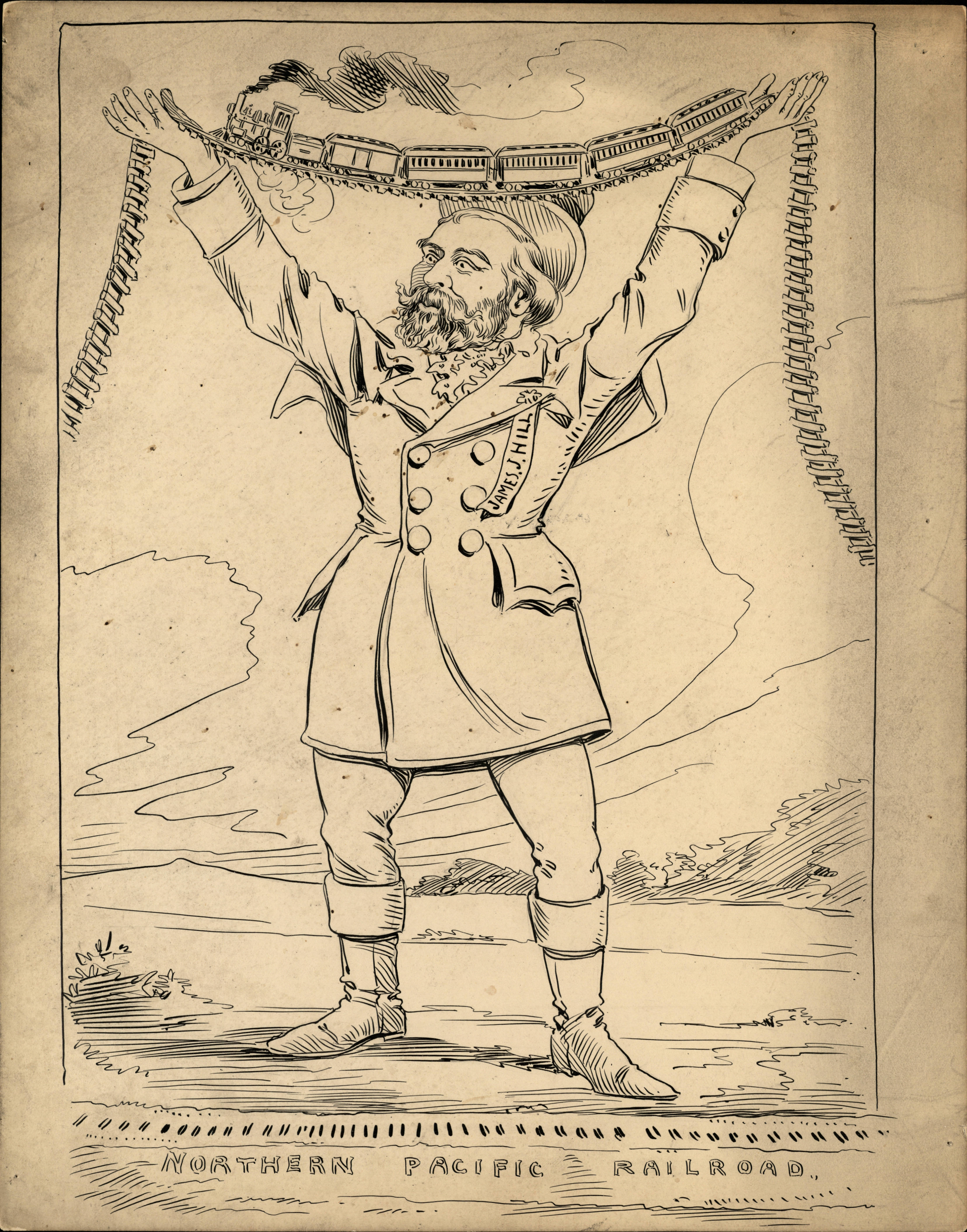
A giant James J. Hill lifts the track of the Northern Pacific Railroad over his head. Hill had acquired the track in 1901.

In 1903, Hill finally got his way with the House of Morgan. Howard Elliott, another veteran of the Chicago, Burlington and Quincy, became president of the Northern Pacific on October 23. Elliott was a relative of the Burlington's crusty chieftain Charles Elliott Perkins, and more distantly the Burlington's great backer, John Murray Forbes. He had spent 20 years in the trenches of Midwest railroading, where rebates, pooling, expansion and rate wars had brought ruinous competition. Having seen the effects of having multiple railroads attempt to serve the same destination, he was very much in tune with James J. Hill's philosophy of "community of interest," a loose affiliation or collusion among roads in an attempt to avoid duplicating routes, rate wars, weak finances and ultimately bankruptcies and reorganizations. Elliott would be left to make peace with the Hill-controlled Great Northern; the Harriman-controlled Union Pacific; and, between 1907 and 1909, the last of the northern transcontinentals, the Chicago, Milwaukee, St. Paul and Pacific Railroad, more commonly known as the Milwaukee Road.

=== Into the twentieth century ===
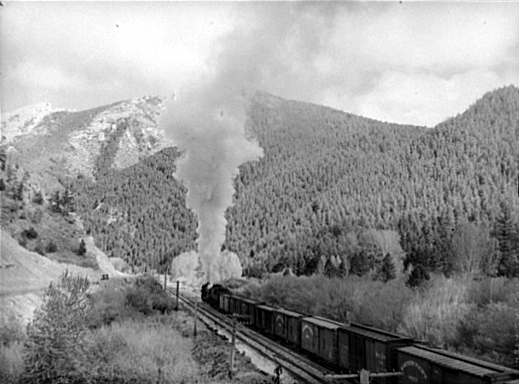
A Northern Pacific train travels over Bozeman Pass in June 1939

The Northern Pacific steadily improved after the turn of the century. Together with the Great Northern, the Northern Pacific also gained control of the Chicago, Burlington and Quincy Railroad, gaining important access to Chicago, the central Middle West and Texas, as well as the Spokane, Portland and Seattle Railway, an important route through eastern and southern Washington. Its physical plant was upgraded continuously, with double tracking in key areas and automatic block signaling along its entire main line. This in turn gave way to centralized traffic control, microwave communications, and radio communications as time progressed.

The Northern Pacific continuously maintained and upgraded its equipment and service. The road helped pioneer the 4-8-4 Northern type steam engine and the 2-8-8-4 Yellowstone. It was also among the first railroads in the country to dieselize—beginning with General Motors’ FTs in 1944—albeit among the last to complete dieselization, not doing so until 1960 owing to low cost (albeit low quality) coal reserves in Wyoming.

The Northern Pacific's premier passenger train, the North Coast Limited, was among the safest and finest in the nation, suffering only one passenger fatality in nearly seventy years of operation.

By 1900, most of the remaining land-grant holdings were located west of Montana, in the "western district". The railroad still hoped to sell this land, both to provide operating funds and to populate the region to provide new markets to sustain the railroad. Nearly all the good farmlands had been sold, leaving large tracts of grazing land or timber. The grazing acreage was poor quality and difficult to sell. However, the timber lands were of high quality; much of these were sold to Frederick Weyerhaeuser.

=== Unification of the Hill Lines ===
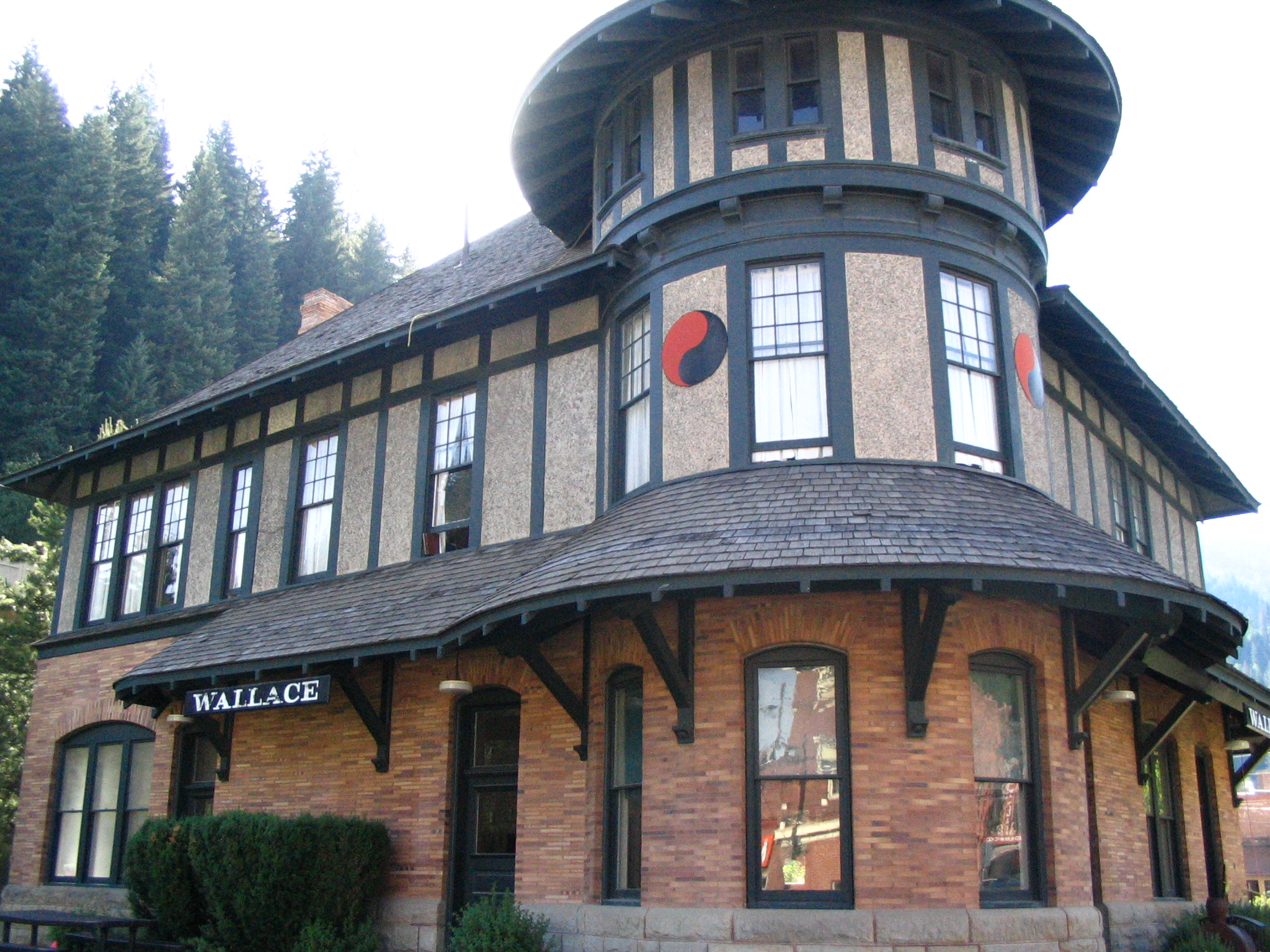
NP depot at Wallace, Idaho, 2007

In later years, Louis W. Menk became president of the Northern Pacific, and then he brought it together with the Chicago, Burlington and Quincy Railroad, the Great Northern Railway, and the Spokane, Portland and Seattle Railway on March 2, 1970, to form the Burlington Northern Railroad. The merger was allowed despite a challenge in the Supreme Court, essentially reversing the outcome of the 1904 Northern Securities ruling. A 900 mi (1,400 km) portion of the former Northern Pacific mainline in Montana was spun off to form the Montana Rail Link. However, as of January 10, 2022, BNSF terminated its lease of the former Northern Pacific right-of-way to the MRL which is set to return to the direct management of the BNSF.

== Divisions ==
Revenue freight traffic, in millions of net ton-miles (including M&I, G&P)
Year	Traffic
1925	6,852
1933	3,600
1944	14,679
1960	11,360
1967	13,629

In 1949, the Northern Pacific's headquarters in Saint Paul presided over a system of 6,889 miles (11,087 km), consisting of 2,831 miles (4,556 km) of main line and 4,057 miles (6,529 km) of branch line, under seven operating divisions.

=== Lake Superior Division ===
Headquartered in Duluth, Minnesota, the Lake Superior Division's main routes were from Duluth to Ashland, Wisconsin, Duluth to Staples, Minnesota, and Duluth to White Bear Lake, Minnesota. The division encompassed 631 route miles: 356 in main line and 274 in branches.

=== St. Paul Division ===
Headquartered in St. Paul, Minnesota in the company's Railroad and Bank Building, the St. Paul Division's main routes were from Saint Paul to Staples, Saint Paul to White Bear Lake, and Staples to Dilworth, Minnesota. The division encompassed 909 route miles: 310 in main line and 599 in branches.

=== Fargo Division ===
Headquartered in Fargo, North Dakota, the Fargo Division's main routes were from Dilworth to Mandan, North Dakota. The division encompassed 1,167 route miles: 216 in main line and 951 in branches.

=== Yellowstone Division ===
Headquartered in Glendive, Montana, the Yellowstone Division's main routes were from Mandan, North Dakota, to Billings, Montana, and from Billings to Livingston, Montana. The division encompassed 875 route miles: 546 in main line and 328 in branches.

=== Rocky Mountain Division ===
Headquartered in Missoula, Montana, the Rocky Mountain Division's main routes were from Livingston to Paradise, Montana via Helena, Montana and Mullan Pass, and from Logan, Montana, to Garrison, Montana, via Butte, Montana, and Homestake Pass. The division encompassed 892 route miles: 563 in main line and 330 in branches. It was home to the principal central district repair facility at Livingston, Montana.

=== Idaho Division ===
Headquartered in Spokane, Washington, the Idaho Division's main routes were from Paradise, Mont., to Yakima, Washington, via Pasco, Washington. The division encompassed 1,123 route miles: 466 in main line and 657 in branches.

=== Tacoma Division ===
Headquartered in Tacoma, Washington, the Tacoma Division's main routes were from Yakima to Stuck Junction, near future Auburn, Washington, Seattle, Washington to Sumas, Washington, on the border with British Columbia, Canada, and from Seattle to Portland, Oregon. The division encompassed 1,034 route miles: 373 in main line and 661 in branches. It was home to the principal west end repair facility at South Tacoma, Washington.

As the railroad expanded, immigrants, families, and single men moved to the Pacific Northwest. Tacoma's population grew rapidly: in 1880 there were 1,098 residents, and in 1889 there were 36,000.

== Passenger service ==
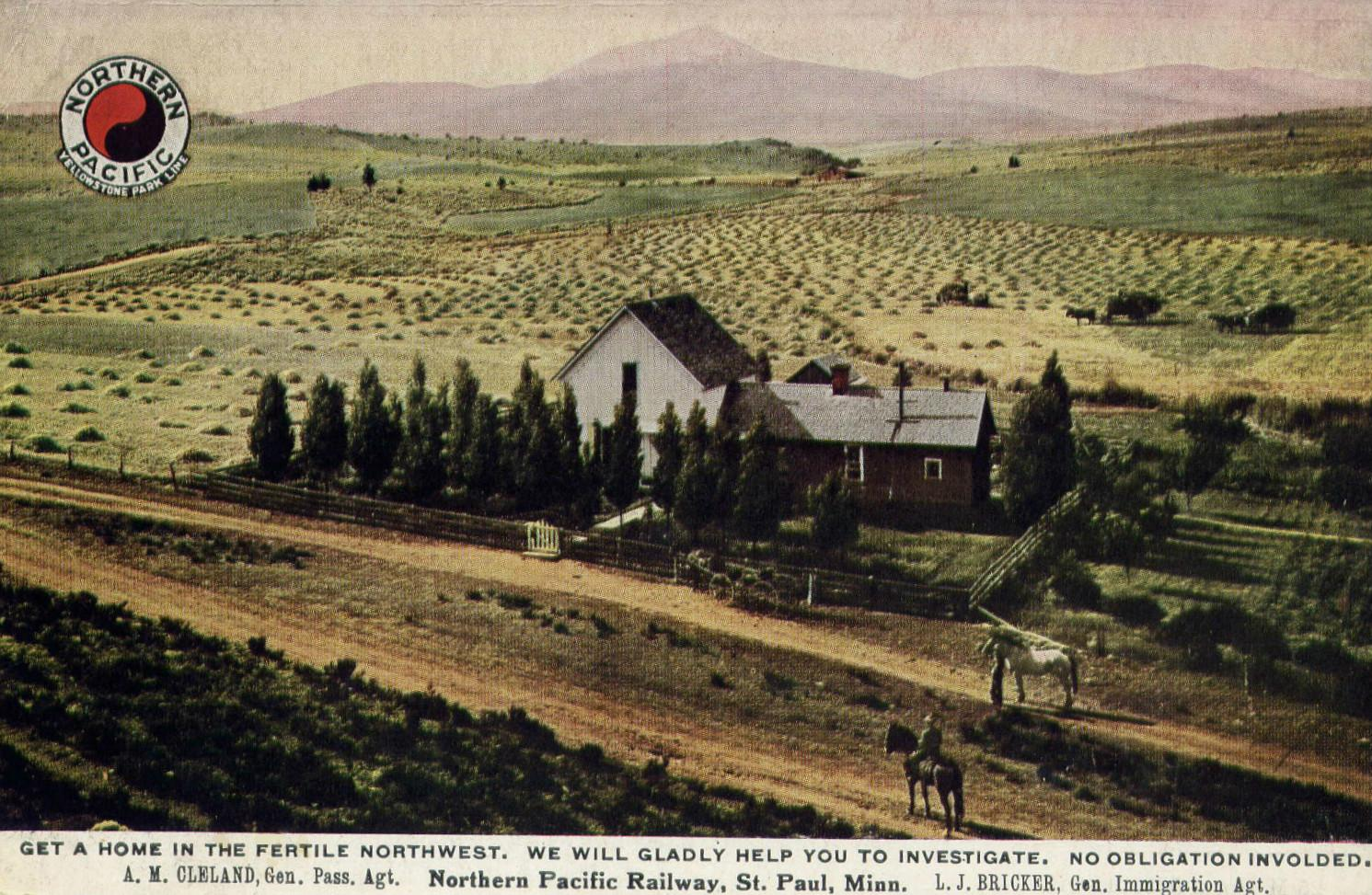
The line encouraged people to make their homes in the Pacific Northwest by having an "immigration agent" and offering special excursion trains for prospective buyers during the winter months.

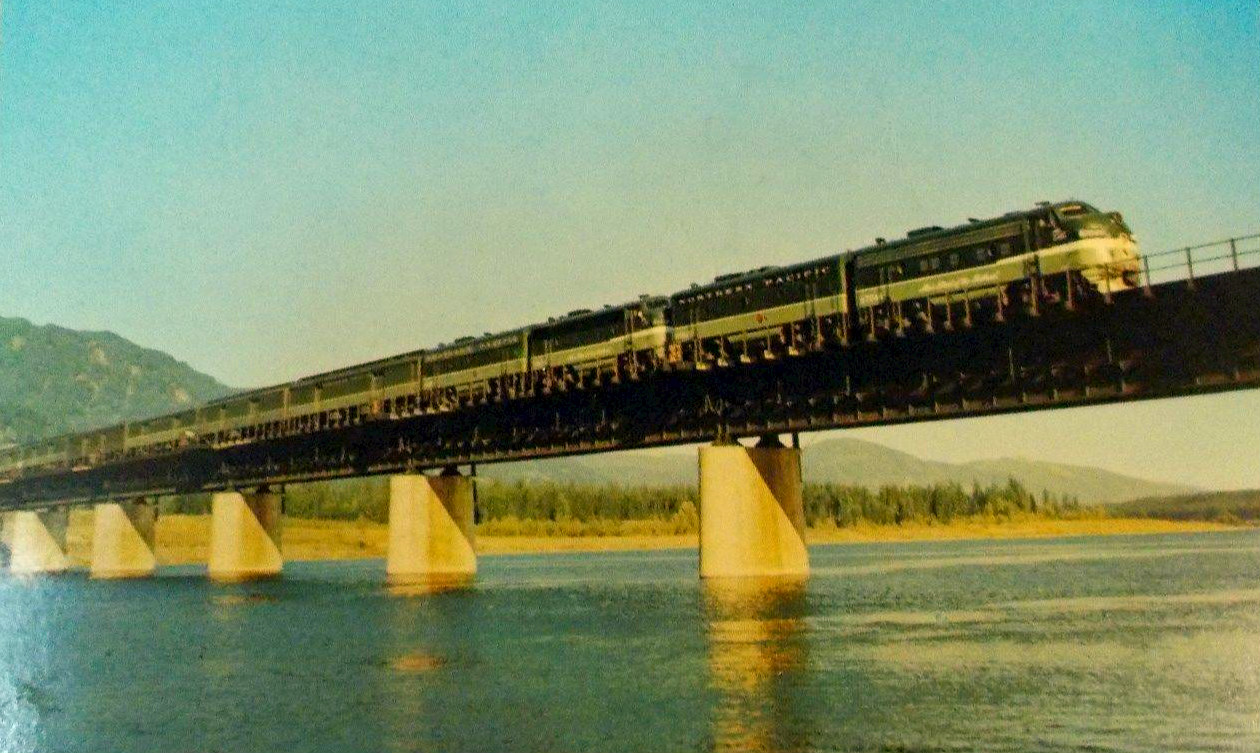
The North Coast Limited was the Northern Pacific's flagship passenger train.

The North Coast Limited was the premier passenger train operated by the Northern Pacific Railway between Chicago and Seattle via Butte, Montana and Homestake Pass. It commenced service on April 29, 1900, served briefly as a Burlington Northern train after the merger on March 2, 1970, and ceased operation on April 30, 1971, the day before Amtrak began service. The Chicago Union Station to Saint Paul leg of the train's route was operated by the Chicago, Burlington and Quincy Railroad along its Mississippi River mainline through Wisconsin.

The Northern Pacific's secondary transcontinental passenger train was the Alaskan, until it was replaced by the Mainstreeter on November 16, 1952. The Mainstreeter, which operated via Helena, Montana and Mullan Pass, continued in service through the Burlington Northern merger until Amtrak Day (May 1, 1971). It had been reduced to a Saint Paul to Seattle train after the last run of the former Burlington Route Black Hawk on April 12–13, 1970.

The Northern Pacific also participated in the Coast Pool Train service between Portland and Seattle with the Great Northern Railway and the Union Pacific Railroad. NP and GN Coast Pool Trains lasted until Amtrak.

There were several other passenger trains which were discontinued before the Burlington Northern merger. These included:

- Saint Paul to International Falls, Minnesota;
- Saint Paul to Duluth, Minnesota (which at one time was also a pool operation, with Great Northern Railway and the Soo Line);
- Duluth to Staples, Minnesota;
- Saint Paul to Jamestown, North Dakota (the last remnant of the Alaskan);
- Fargo, North Dakota to Winnipeg, Manitoba;
- Minneapolis to Taylors Falls commuter rail;

=== The Route of "the Great Big Baked Potato" ===
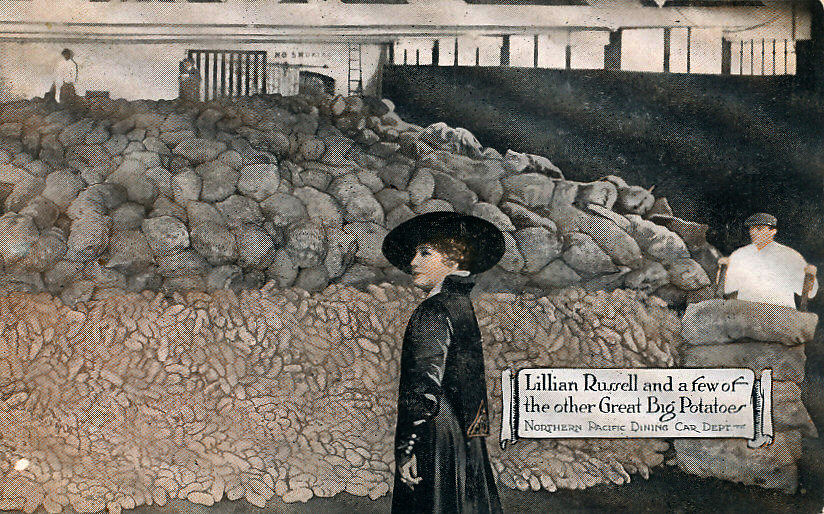
Actress Lillian Russell and other Hollywood stars were hired to promote the railroad's potatoes.

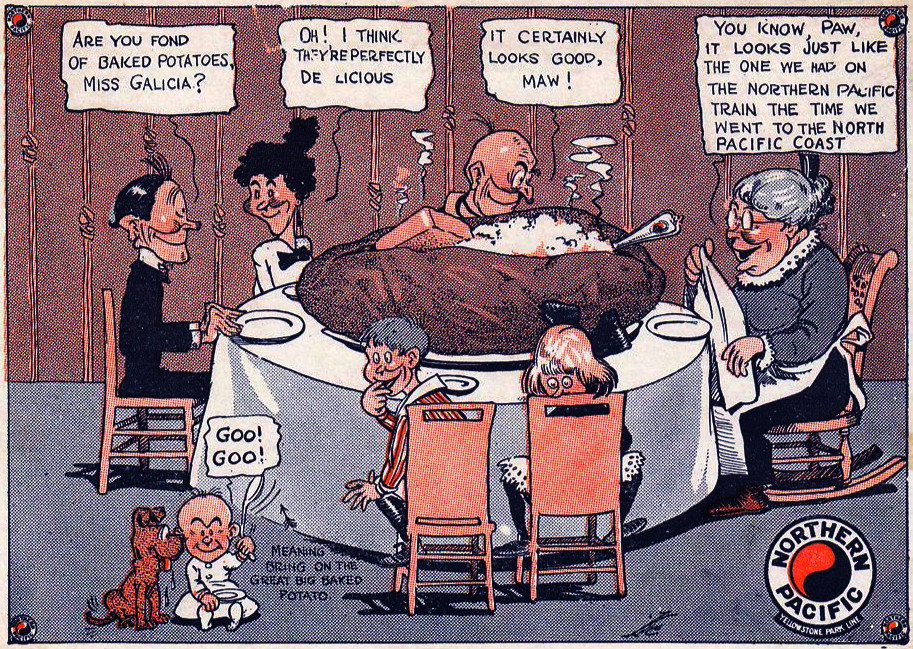
A comic postcard circa 1910 to 1920 promoting "The Great Big Baked Potato".

Hazen Titus was appointed as the line's dining car superintendent in 1908. He learned that Yakima Valley farmers were unable to sell their potato crops because the potatoes they were growing were simply too large; they fed them to the hogs. Titus learned that a single potato could weigh from two to five pounds, but that smaller potatoes were preferred by the end buyers of the vegetable because many people considered large potatoes inedible due to their thick, rough skin.

Titus and his staff discovered the "inedible" potatoes were delicious after baking in a slow oven. He contracted to purchase as many potatoes as the farmers could produce that were more than two pounds in weight. Soon after the first delivery of "Netted Gem Bakers", they were offered to diners on the North Coast Limited beginning in early 1909. Word of the line's specialty offering traveled quickly, and before long it was using "the Great Big Baked Potato" as a slogan to promote the railroad's passenger service. Hollywood stars were hired to promote it. When an addition was built for the Northern Pacific's Seattle commissary in 1914, a Railway Age reporter wrote, "A large trade mark, in the shape of a baked potato, 40 ft. long and 18 ft. in diameter, surmounts the roof. The potato is electric lighted and its eyes, through the electric mechanism, are made to wink constantly. A cube of butter thrust into its split top glows intermittently." Premiums such as postcards, letter openers, and spoons were also produced to promote "The Route of the Great Big Baked Potato"; the slogan served the Northern Pacific for about 50 years.

== Presidents ==
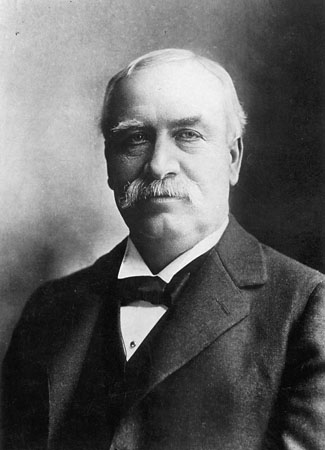
Henry Villard, 6th president of Northern Pacific

Presidents of Northern Pacific Railway were:

- Josiah Perham, 1864–1866.
- John Gregory Smith, 1866–1872.
- George Washington Cass, 1872–1875.
- Charles Barstow Wright, 1875–1879.
- Frederick Billings, 1879–1881.
- Henry Villard, 1881–1884.
- Robert Harris, 1884–1888.
- Thomas Fletcher Oakes, 1888–1893.
- Brayton Ives, 1893–1896.
- Edward Dean Adams, 1896.
- Edwin Winter, 1896.
- Charles Sanger Mellen, 1897–1903.
- Howard Elliott, 1903–1913.
- Jule Murat Hannaford, 1913–1920.
- Charles Donnelly, 1920–1939.
- Charles Eugene Denney, 1939–1950.
- Robert Stetson Macfarlane, 1951–1966.
- Louis W. Menk, 1966–1970.

== Chief engineers ==
- Edwin Ferry Johnson (1803–1872), engineer-in-chief, 1867. Wrote The Railroad To the Pacific, Northern Route, Its General Characteristics, Relative Merits, Etc. in 1854.
- William Milnor Roberts (1810–1881), engineer-in-chief, 1869 to 1879. Proposed the general route of the Northern Pacific from Bismarck to Portland. Also, Vice President, American Society of Civil Engineers, 1873 to 1878, and then President, 1878.
- Adna Anderson (1827–1889), engineer-in-chief, February 18, 1880, to January 1888. In October 1886, he was also named second vice-president of the Northern Pacific. He completed the line between Saint Paul, Minnesota, and Wallula (where it connected with the Oregon Railway and Navigation Company's line to Portland), witnessing the driving of the last spike on September 8, 1883. Thereafter, he evaluated possible routes for the Cascade Division, intended to connect the NP at some point near the mouth of the Snake River with Tacoma, Washington on Puget Sound. Preliminary reconnaissance and surveys began in March 1880, and in autumn, 1883, Anderson concluded that the line should be built through Stampede Pass.
- John William Kendrick (1853–1924), chief engineer, January 1888, to July 1893. From July 1893, to February 1, 1899, he was general manager of the reorganized Northern Pacific Railway.
- Edwin Harrison McHenry (1859 – August 21, 1931), chief engineer, July 1893, to September 1, 1901. Subsequently, he was chief engineer for the Canadian Pacific Railway and then fourth vice-president of the New York, New Haven and Hartford Railroad.
- William Lafayette Darling (1856–1938), chief engineer, September 1, 1901, to September 1903, and January 1906, to 1916. Between 1905 and 1906, he was chief engineer for the Chicago, Milwaukee, St. Paul and Pacific Railroad, returning to the NP in 1906 as chief engineer and also vice-president and engineer in charge of construction of the Spokane, Portland and Seattle Railway.
- Edward J. Pearson (1863–1928), chief engineer, September 1903, to December 1905.
- Howard Eveleth Stevens, chief engineer, 1916 to 1928.
- Bernard Blum, chief engineer, 1928 to March 1953.
- Harold Robert Peterson (1896–1963), chief engineer, March 1953, to May 1962.
- Douglas Harlow Shoemaker, chief engineer, May 1962, to March 2, 1970.

== Trademark ==
In search of a trademark, the Northern Pacific considered and rejected many designs. Edwin Harrison McHenry, the Chief Engineer, was struck with a geometric design, a Taegeuk in the Korean flag he saw while visiting the Korean exhibit at the Chicago World's Fair in 1893. The idea came to him that it was just the symbol for the long-sought-for trademark. With a slight modification, and rendered in red and black, the symbol became the railroad's trademark.

In 1876, photographer Frank Jay Haynes began contract work with the railroad for publicity photographs. In 1881 he met Charles Fee and through his 20-year friendship with Fee, Haynes became known as the "Official Photographer of the N.P.R.R". His "Northern Pacific Views" photographically documented over the years, the routes, destinations, infrastructure and equipment of the railroad.

== See also ==
- List of preserved Northern Pacific Railway rolling stock
