= Oregon and Transcontinental Company =

19th-century holding company

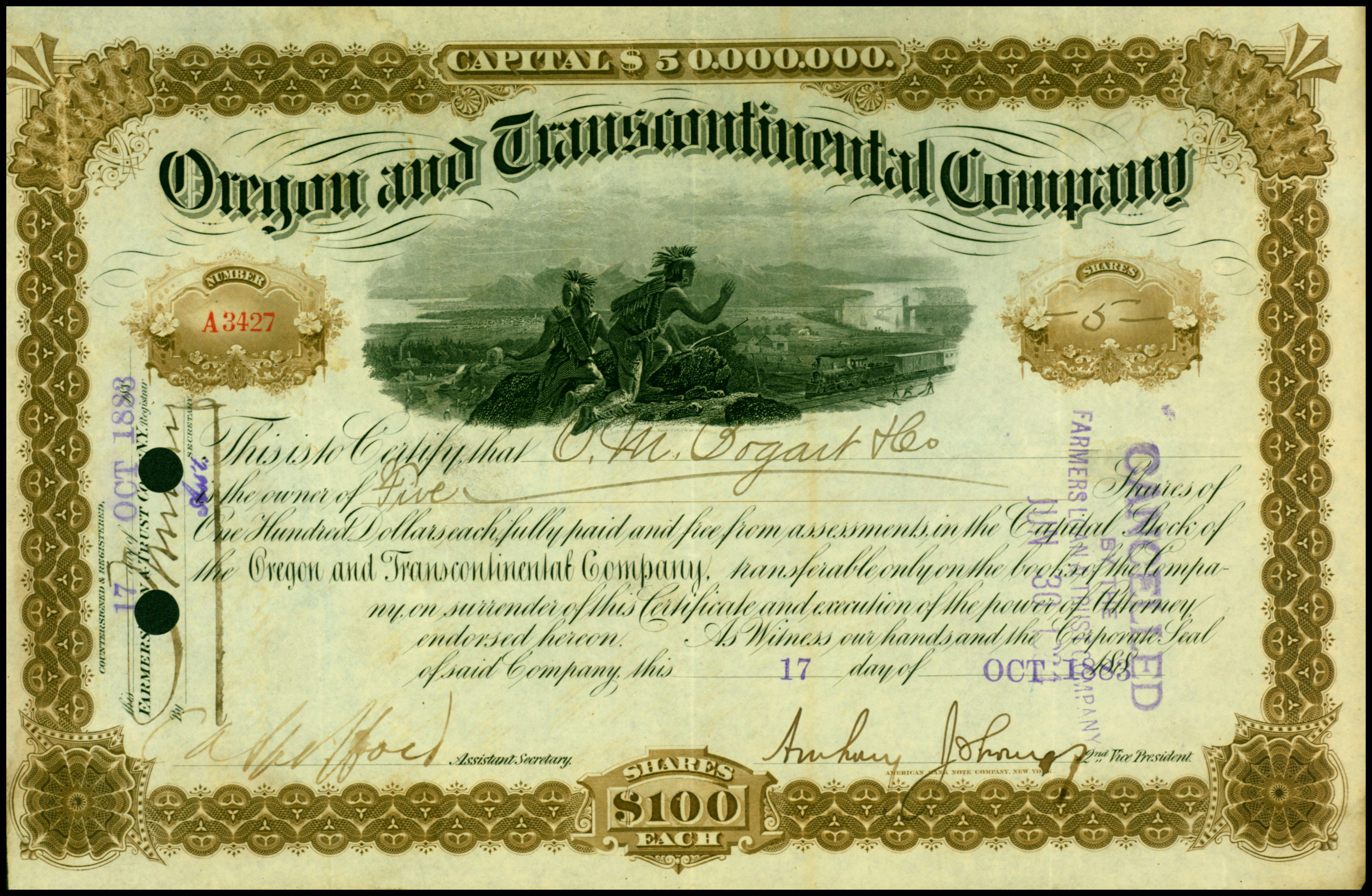
Share of the Oregon and Transcontinental Company, issued 17. October 1883

The Oregon and Transcontinental Company was a 19th-century holding company in the United States, organized by Henry Villard in 1881 to control the Northern Pacific Railroad and Oregon Railway and Navigation Company. It was incorporated in Oregon. New Jersey passed legislation in 1889 to facilitate the control of other companies by another corporation with a goal of encouraging trusts to convert into holding companies and relocate to that state. Oregon and Transcontinental in 1890 re-incorporated as a holding company in New Jersey and became the North American Company so that it could take advantage of these expanded corporate powers and invest in a wider range of businesses.
