= Charles Sanger Mellen =

American railroad man

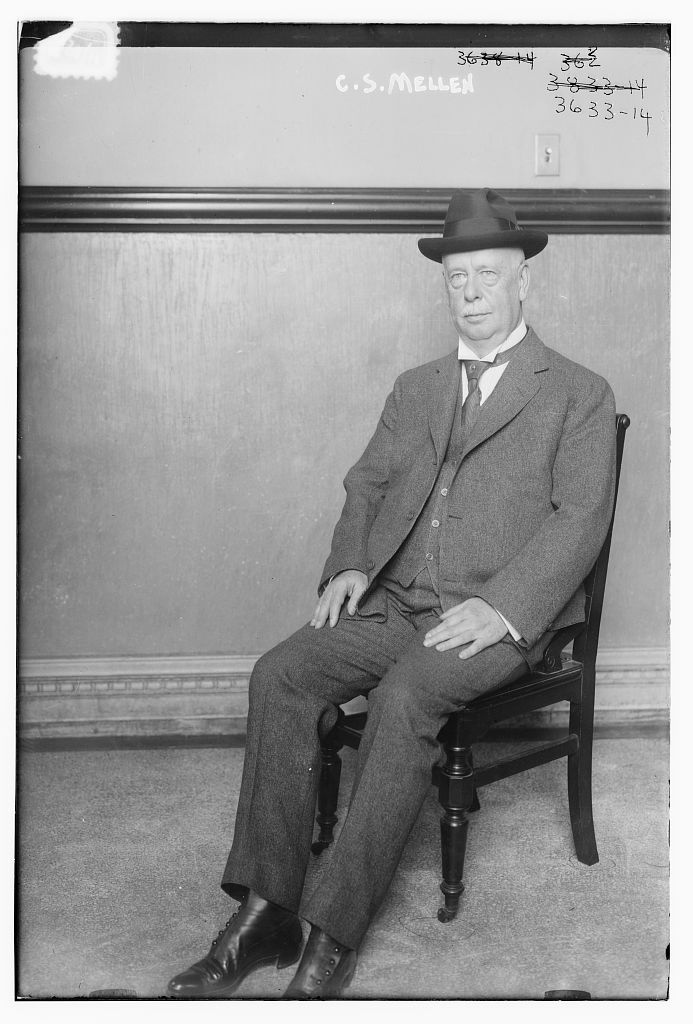
Charles Sanger Mellen in 1915

Charles Sanger Mellen (August 16, 1852 – November 17, 1927) was an American railroad man whose career culminated in the presidencies of the Northern Pacific Railway (1897–1903) and the New York, New Haven and Hartford Railroad (1903–1913). His goal, along with the New Haven's financier J. P. Morgan, was to consolidate, electrify and modernize all the main railroads of New England, so as to lower competition and produce higher profits. The result of his abrasive tactics alienated public opinion, led to high prices for acquisitions and costly construction; the accident rate soared when efforts were made to save on maintenance costs. Debt soared from $14 million in 1903 to $242 million in 1913, when it was hit by an antitrust lawsuit by the federal government on the charge of monopolizing New England's rail traffic. He was called, "The last of the railway czars."

== Railroad Man ==
Mellen was born in Lowell, Massachusetts, United States, on August 16, 1852. His family soon moved to Concord, New Hampshire where he attended high school, graduating in 1867. Rather than attending college, he began his railroad career as a clerk at the Northern New Hampshire Railroad in Concord in 1870. After a short time at the Central Vermont Railroad and back to the Northern New Hampshire Railroad, he moved to the Boston and Lowell Railroad (B&L) where he was promoted to Superintendent. The Boston and Lowell enjoyed revenues from leasing use of its lines into Boston to the Boston and Maine Railroad. Its policies led the B&M to build its own line into Boston and to fight with the B&L to the New Hampshire courts. Mellen was the President of the B&L when it lost its court case, and ceased independent operations in 1887 when it was leased to the Boston and Maine Railroad. From 1888 to 1892 he was purchasing agent, then General Traffic Manager of the Union Pacific Railroad, where he formed a friendship with Diamond Jim Brady. In 1892, he became general manager of the New York and New England Railroad, during a time when it was engaged in a bitter war with the New Haven. Charles P. Clark, the New Haven's president, hired him away from his competitor in November 1892. Mellen later testified that "[Clark] said I was too much of a nuisance on the New England." Mellen came to the attention of J. P. Morgan when he drove such a hard bargain with the New York Central that Chauncey Depew complained to Morgan, a director of both the New Haven and the New York Central. Morgan's grandfather was an original investor in the Hartford and New Haven Railroad, one of the two principal predecessors of the New Haven. His interests had led him to become a director of the New Haven in 1891.

== Morgan man at Northern Pacific ==
Morgan's bank had become receiver of the Northern Pacific in August 1893. Mellen had an active role in the reorganization and became president of the NP when it emerged from receivership in 1896. During his tenure there, NP's gross revenue increased by 156%, some of the increase at the expense of the Great Northern Railway (GN), part of the same supposedly anti-competitive Northern Securities Company as the NP. Furthermore, Mellen made acquisitions that enabled the NP to reach the Pacific and thereby compete with the GN over its entire route. James J. Hill, founder of the GN and part of the Trust, called Mellen and his Morgan-appointed predecessor there "overrated underachievers". But by this time Mellen had become a staunch Morgan man. He told reporters, "I wear the Morgan collar, but I am proud of it." But yet he was not fully informed about the machinations of Morgan, Hill, and Harriman concerning stock in his company. On Monday, May 6, 1901, the Morgan interests were buying up NP stock. On Tuesday Mellen wired an NP vice president in New York "Cannot you give me some idea what is transpiring, to explain tremendous movement our stock?".

== The New Haven ==
When Charles P. Clark resigned as the New Haven's president in 1900, Mellen made inquiries for the job, but Morgan needed him at the NP. By 1903 Morgan's priorities had changed. Upon assuming the New Haven presidency Mellen undertook a program of "Morganization" of transportation in New England that extended from railroads to steamship lines and street railways. The New Haven even bought control of the chronically unprofitable New York, Ontario and Western Railway. His efforts, in particular the attempted takeover of the Boston and Maine Railroad, brought him into public contention with antitrust lawyer Louis Brandeis in Massachusetts. In May 1908 Morgan's partner George Walbridge Perkins wrote to Morgan: "I still feel, as I have for couple of years, that Mr. Mellen is getting the New Haven into considerable of a muddle by his financial methods and this, I think, is becoming more or less the general opinion." The failed Morganization of the New Haven was among the great embarrassments to the Morgan interests. The Mellen-Morgan policies led to the New Haven's future financial troubles, culminating in bankruptcy in 1935. Mellen's Morganization efforts in New England also put him in executive positions at the Maine Central Railroad, the New York, Ontario and Western Railway, and the Boston and Maine Railroad.

His goal, along with the New Haven's financier J. P. Morgan, was to consolidate, electrify and modernize all the main railroads of New England, so as to lower competition and produce higher profits. The result of his abrasive tactics alienated public opinion, led to high prices for acquisitions and costly construction; the accident rate soared when efforts were made to save on maintenance costs. Debt soared from $14 million in 1903 to $242 million in 1913, when it was hit by an antitrust lawsuit by the federal government on the charge of monopolizing New England's rail traffic. He was called, "The last of the railway czars."

== Loyal ==
J. P. Morgan was aged and ill when the difficulties of the New Haven and other efforts led him to be summoned to give testimony before the Pujo Committee. Morgan died on March 31, 1913. Mellen shouldered the burden of testifying and faced indictments. He provided testimony concerning nearly $10,000,000 disbursed in connection with acquiring the franchise for the New York, Westchester and Boston Railway and resolving a franchise dispute with the New York and Port Chester Railroad.

Preceded by Edwin Winter	President of Northern Pacific Railway; 1897 – 1903	Succeeded by Howard Elliott
Preceded by John M. Hall	President of New Haven Railroad; 1903 – 1913	Succeeded by Howard Elliott
Preceded by	President of Maine Central Railroad; 1910 – 1914	Succeeded by
