= Robert Harris (railroad manager) =

American civil engineer and railroad executive

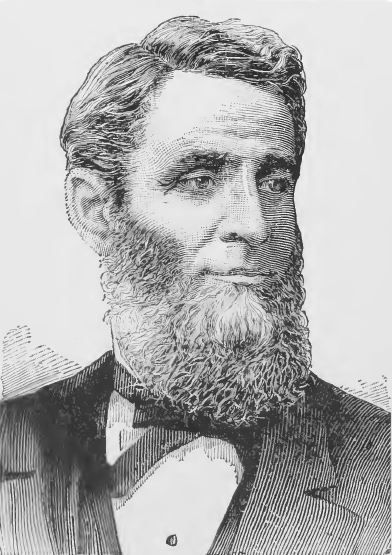
- Circa 1887
- Born: July 29, 1830; Portsmouth, New Hampshire; United States
- Died: April 21, 1894 (aged 63); Rochester, New York

Robert Harris (July 29, 1830 – April 21, 1894) was a civil engineer and railroad executive who became president of the Chicago, Burlington and Quincy Railroad and Northern Pacific Railway.

== Life ==
Robert Harris was born on July 29, 1830, in Portsmouth, New Hampshire. His father was educator William Coffin Harris (born 1767) and mother was Mary Johnson. His brother Charles Coffin Harris (1822–1881) became the Chief Justice of the Supreme Court of the Kingdom of Hawaii. He studied civil engineering in Boston, and briefly studied law like his older brother.

In 1852 Harris became assistant engineer for the Hartford, Providence and Fishkill Railroad (later the New York and New England Railroad). In April 1853 he moved to Wisconsin and was resident engineer for Beloit and Madison Railroad (later the Chicago and North Western Railway). From April 1856 to February 1860 he was superintendent of the Racine and Mississippi Railroad (later part of the Milwaukee Road system). In April 1860 he moved to Texas to become superintendent of the Galveston, Houston and Henderson Railroad. From November 1860 to June 1861 he was superintendent of the Buffalo Bayou, Brazos and Colorado Railway.

During the American Civil War he worked for the Quartermaster's department of the Union Army in North Carolina. In July 1863 he became assistant general superintendent of the Chicago, Burlington and Quincy Railroad (CBQ) where he would work for 15 years. In May 1865 he became general superintendent, and in February 1876 he became president of CBQ until June 1878. In October 1878 he became general manager of the New York, Lake Erie and Western Railroad (NY&E). In December 1880 he became vice-president of NY&E until January 1884.

On October 15, 1879, he had become a director and member of the board of directors of the Northern Pacific Railway (N.P.). Although offered the position of vice-president two years later in 1881, he declined at that time and Thomas Fletcher Oakes took that position.

After sixth Northern Pacific president Henry Villard stepped down, he became the seventh president of the N.P.R.R. in January 1884. After four years in office, in October 1888 he resigned, Oakes became the N.P.'s eighth president, and Harris elevated to be Chairman of the Board of Directors. In 1893 he was re-elected to the board and named vice-president. He died April 21, 1894, in Rochester, New York, on his way back from a business meeting.

== See also ==
- List of railroad executives

| Preceded by | President of Chicago, Burlington and Quincy Railroad; 1876 – 1878 | Succeeded by |
| Preceded by Henry Villard | President of Northern Pacific Railway; 1884 – 1888 | Succeeded by Thomas Fletcher Oakes |
