= Jule Murat Hannaford =

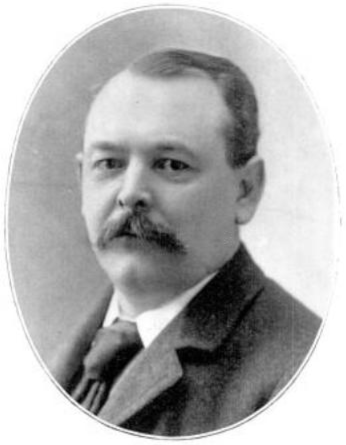
- Born: November 19, 1850; Claremont, New Hampshire
- Died: September 24, 1934 (aged 83); Saint Paul, Minnesota
- Occupation: Railroad executive

Jule Murat Hannaford (November 19, 1850 – September 24, 1934) was president of Northern Pacific Railway 1913–1920.

== Biography ==
He was born November 19, 1850, at Claremont, New Hampshire.

Entered railway service: June 1866, since which he has been consecutively to May 11, 1872, clerk in general freight office Vermont Central Railroad at St. Albans, Vermont; May 17, 1872 to date, with the Northern Pacific Railroad and its successor, the Northern Pacific Railway as follows: May 17, 1872, to May 1, 1879, in general freight and passenger office; May 1, 1879, to May 1, 1881, assistant general freight and passenger agent; May 1, 1881, to August 1, 1883, general freight agent, Eastern Division; August 1, 1883, to March 1, 1884, assistant superintendent, Freight Traffic; March 1, 1884, to May 1, 1886, general freight agent; May 1, 1886, to March 15, 1890, traffic manager; May 15, 1890, to February 1, 1899, general traffic manager; April 1, 1890, to September 1, 1893, also general traffic manager, Wisconsin Central Lines during their lease to the Northern Pacific Railroad; February 1, 1899, to April 1, 1902, third vice-president; April 1, 1902, to August 27, 1913, second vice-president; June 1, 1895, to June 28, 1906, also general superintendent and vice-president, Northern Pacific Express Company; and June 28, 1906, to August 27, 1913, president, same company; August 27, 1913, to June 20, 1918, president, Northern Pacific; June 20, 1918, to March 1, 1920, federal manager, same road; March 1 to December 1, 1920, president; December 1, 1920, to date, vice-chairman and director.

Jule M. Hannaford married Cordelia Loomis Foster(1855-1933)in St. Albans, VT in the Union Episcopal Church in 1882. They had 2 sons, Jule Murat, Jr.(1885-1952) and Foster (1888-1981).

He died at his home in Saint Paul, Minnesota on September 24, 1934.

Hannaford, North Dakota was named after J.M. Hannaford when it was laid out by the Northern Pacific Railroad.

Preceded by Howard Elliott	President of Northern Pacific Railway; 1913 – 1920	Succeeded by Charles Donnelly
