= Edwin Winter =

American businessman

Edwin Wheeler Winter (born November 18, 1845, in Bloomfield, Vermont – June 28, 1930, in Little Compton, Rhode Island) was president of Northern Pacific Railway in 1896 then president of Brooklyn Rapid Transit Company, Brooklyn Heights Railroad and allied companies.

== Life and career ==
Winter was born on November 18, 1845, in Bloomfield, Vermont. Winter entered railway service by joining Union Pacific in 1867, where he worked till 1870 and moved to Chicago. From 1870 to 1873, Winter was a contractor’s agent on construction projects at various railroads. From 1873 to 1876, Winter was a general claim agent with Chicago & North Western Railway. From 1876 to 1879, Winter was general superintendent in western Wisconsin for West Wisconsin Railway Company. From 1879 to 1880, Winter was general superintendent for the Chicago, St. Paul and Minneapolis Railroad. From 1880 to 1881, Winter was general superintendent for the St. Paul, Minneapolis and Omaha Railroad. From 1881 to November 16, 1885, Winter was assistant president for Chicago, St. Paul, Minneapolis and Omaha Railway. June 6, 1888, he became director of the railway, and on November 16, 1885, to July 1896, Winter was general manager. From July 1896, to August 31, 1897, Winter was president for the Northern Pacific Railway. In September 1899, Winter was president for the Chicago Transfer and Clearing Company at Chicago, Illinois; In February 1902, Winter became president of the Brooklyn Rapid Transit Company, Brooklyn Heights Railroad and allied companies. In 1913 he was appointed receiver for the Chicago & Eastern Illinois Railroad, which at the time was controlled by the St. Louis–San Francisco Railway.

On February 16, 1870, Winter married Elisabeth "Libby" Cannon in Illinois and had five children in the subsequent years. He died June 28, 1930, at his summer home in Little Compton, Rhode Island.

| Preceded by Edward Dean Adams | President of Northern Pacific Railway; 1896 | Succeeded by Charles Sanger Mellen |
| Preceded by | President of Brooklyn Rapid Transit Company; 1902 – | Succeeded by |
