= Charles Donnelly (railroad) =

American railway president

Charles Donnelly (November 9, 1869 – September 4, 1939) was president of Northern Pacific Railway 1920–1939.

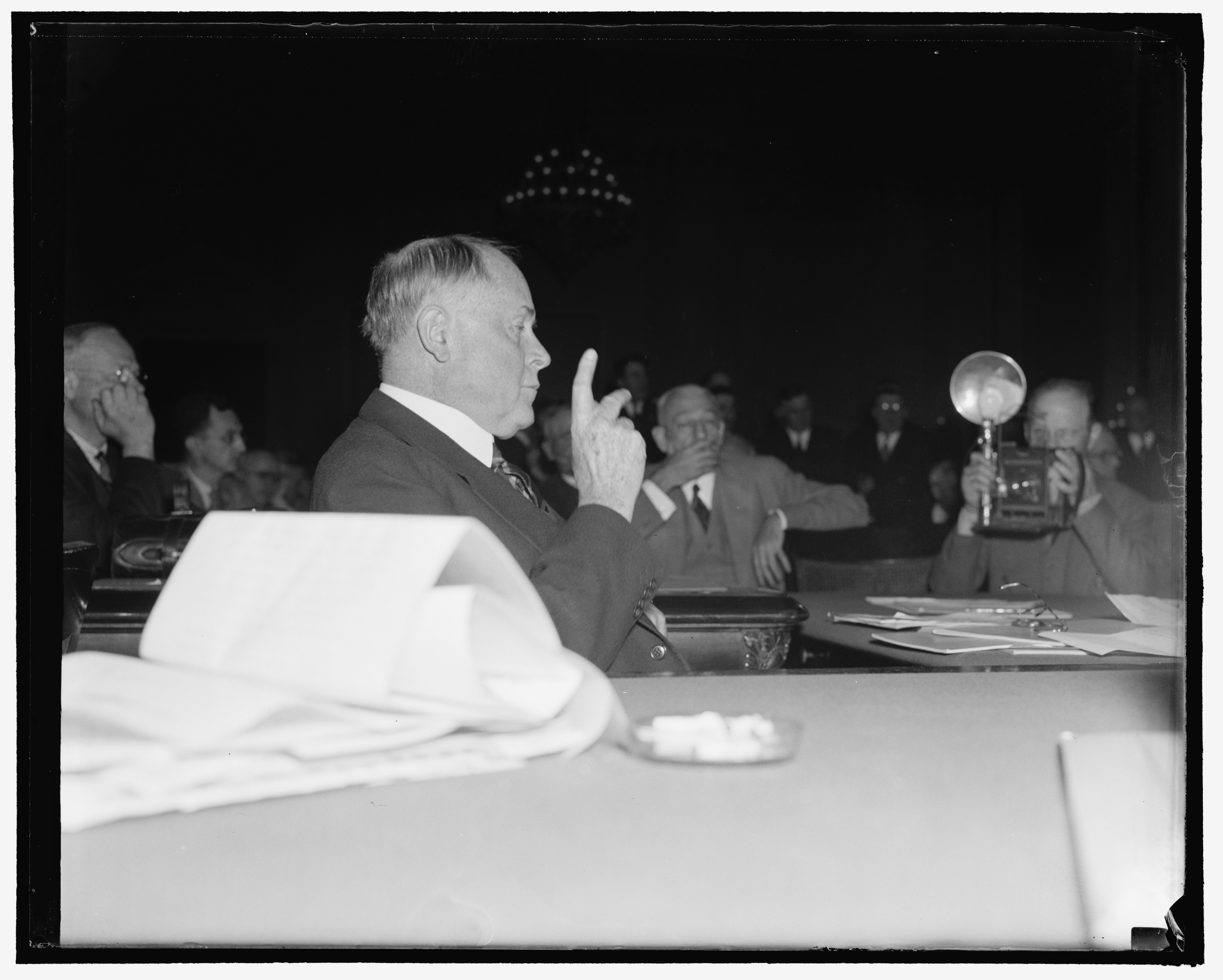

== Biography ==
He was born in Wisconsin Rapids, Wisconsin, on November 9, 1869, the son of Thomas F. and Catherine Corwin. He married Berthania McMichael on November 6, 1894.

He was educated at Georgetown University, graduating with an LL.B. in 1896, after which he began his law practice in Washington, D.C.

In 1903 Donnelly became division counsel for the Northern Pacific Railway, having an office in Helena, Montana. He held this position until 1908 when he was promoted to assistant general counsel based in St. Paul, Minnesota; further promotions led to his presidency of the railroad beginning in 1920. He remained in this position until his death in 1939.

Preceded by Jule Murat Hannaford	President of Northern Pacific Railway; 1920 – 1939	Succeeded by Charles Eugene Denney
