= Thomas Fletcher Oakes =

- Born: July 15, 1843; Boston, Massachusetts, US
- Died: March 14, 1919 (aged 75); Seattle, Washington, US
- Occupation: Railroad executive

Thomas Fletcher Oakes (July 15, 1843 – March 14, 1919) was president of Northern Pacific Railway from 1888 to 1893.

== Biography ==
Thomas Fletcher Oakes was born in Boston on July 15, 1843. He entered railway service June 1, 1863; to April, 1879, on Kansas Pacific Railroad; two years secretary to contractors, two years purchasing agent; three years purchasing agent and assistant treasurer; six years general freight agent; one year vice-president; one year five months general superintendent; April 1879, to May 1880, general superintendent Kansas City, Fort Scott and Gulf and Kansas City, Lawrence and Southern; May 1880, to May 1881, vice-president and general manager Oregon Railway and Navigation Company; May 1881, to November 1883, vice-president Northern Pacific Railway, and November 1883, to 1888, vice-president and general manager.

Oakes was placed in charge of the Columbia & Puget Sound Railroad after Charles Barstow Wright formed the Oregon Improvement Company. Harris retained Oakes as executive vice president, after Harris became president of Northern Pacific.

His son, Walter Oakes, of Seattle, a founder of the Alaska Steamship Company, was father of the ethnologist Maud Oakes.

Thomas Fletcher Oakes died at his residence at the Sorrento Hotel in Seattle on March 14, 1919.

Preceded by Robert Harris	President of Northern Pacific Railway; 1888 – 1893	Succeeded by Brayton Ives
