= Howard Elliott (railroad executive) =

American railroad executive (1860–1928)

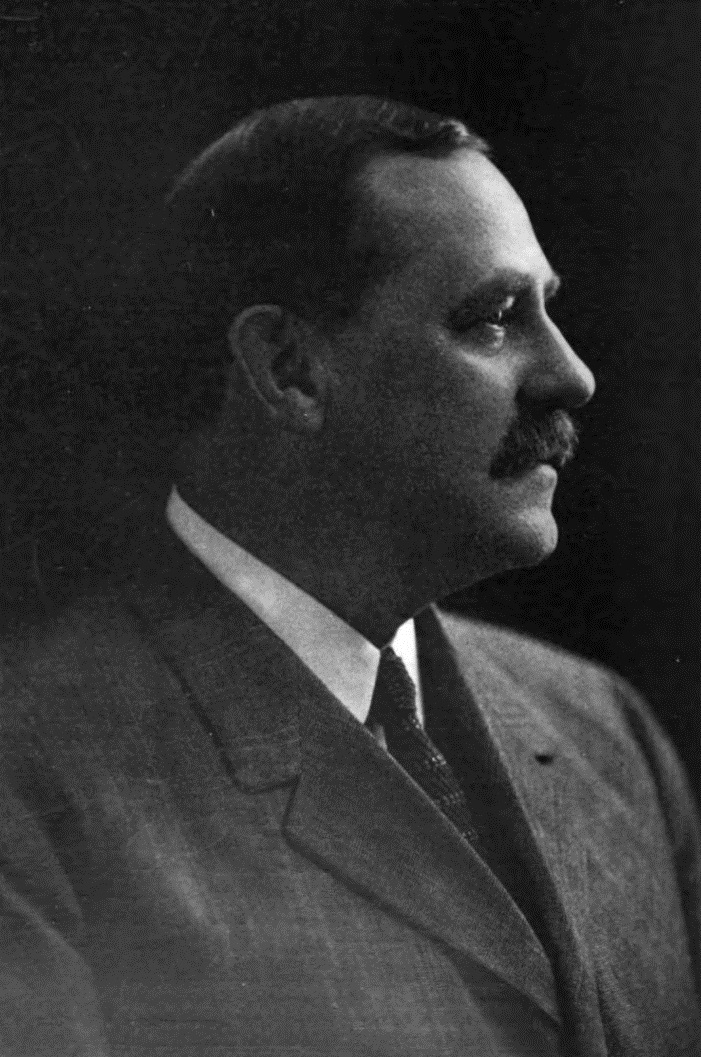
- Born: December 6, 1860; New York City
- Died: July 8, 1928 (aged 67); New York City

Howard Elliott (December 6, 1860 – July 8, 1928) was President of Northern Pacific Railway from 1903 to 1913, and President of New York, New Haven and Hartford Railroad from 1913 to 1917.

== Biography ==
Elliott was born on December 6, 1860, in New York, and received a degree from Harvard University. He entered railway service during the summer of 1880, and during college break, he worked as a rodman on the Chicago, Burlington and Quincy Railroad. After graduation from Lawrence Scientific School in 1881 with a degree in civil engineering, he became a clerk in the president's office of the St. Louis, Keokuk and Northwestern Railway. From 1887 to 1891, he was a general freight and passenger agent, and from 1891 to 1896, also became an agent of the Hannibal and St. Joseph and Kansas City, St. Joseph and Council Bluffs lines. From 1896 to 1902, he became general manager, and from 1902 to 1903, second vice-president of the Chicago, Burlington and Quincy lines. In 1903, he was elected president of the Northern Pacific, and also president of various subsidiary companies of the Northern Pacific.

On July 25, 1913, he was elected president and director of the New Haven system, succeeding Charles Sanger Mellen, and served in that position until 1917. Elliott's term as president of the New Haven began with the wreck of the Bar Harbor Express on September 2, 1913, a disaster of such scope that had not been seen on the New Haven.

Elliott faced many difficulties throughout his career in the Northern Pacific. The road when he took charge of it was not in very good physical condition. Elliott increased its mileage from 5,111 to 6,032 miles, and its revenue freight train load from 326 to 511 tons. When the Chicago, Milwaukee and St. Paul built its extension to the Puget Sound right through the Northern Pacific territory, cutting severely into the competition, Elliott continued with improvements and was able to show a surplus of over $3 million in 1911 and one of over $2 million 1912. When George J. Gould retired as president of the Missouri Pacific in 1911, Elliott was offered the presidency of that road, but declined, preferring to remain in New England.

Elliott was a member of the Railroads' War Board and advised the United States Railroad Administration during World War I. He died on July 8, 1928.

Preceded by Charles Sanger Mellen	President of Northern Pacific Railway; 1903 – 1913	Succeeded by Jule Murat Hannaford
