= Ni venganza ni perdón =

2026 book by Julio Scherer Ibarra and Jorge Fernández Menéndez

- Author: Julio Scherer Ibarra and Jorge Fernández Menéndez
- Language: Spanish
- Genre: Non-fiction
- Publisher: Planeta
- Publication date: 11 February 2026
- Publication place: Mexico
- Media type: Print
- Pages: 388
- ISBN: 978-6073939263

Ni venganza ni perdón: Una amistad al filo del poder (lit. 'Neither Revenge nor Forgiveness: A Friendship at the Edge of Power') is a 2026 non-fiction book written by the writer and lawyer Julio Scherer Ibarra in collaboration with the journalist Jorge Fernández Menéndez, who also wrote the prologue.

In the book, Scherer relates his almost thirty-year relationship with Andrés Manuel López Obrador (AMLO), who was an opposition leader for decades and later served as President of Mexico from 2018 to 2024. During his administration, Scherer became one of the most powerful persons in the country, as he served as Legal Counsel to the President from the beginning of AMLO's term until September 2021, when he resigned amid allegations of extortion and of creating an influence-peddling network. Following his resignation, according to Scherer, the Attorney General of Mexico initiated legal proceedings and media campaigns against him. In 2024, Scherer sent two letters, one to AMLO and another to his successor, Claudia Sheinbaum, stating that he would seek to clear his name.

The book recounts internal developments during the first half of AMLO's six-year term, including strategic decisions, internal conflicts, and key aspects of national politics. Among the topics addressed are the creation of the National Guard, AMLO's relationship with the Supreme Court and its then president Arturo Zaldívar, the political management of the COVID-19 pandemic, the attempted assassination attack against Omar García Harfuch, and the case of General Salvador Cienfuegos. The book also mentions and criticizes multiple politicians, arguing that they lacked the necessary expertise or relevant experience for their positions and were appointed primarily on the basis of loyalty. It also focuses on Jesús Ramírez Cuevas, a journalist and political communications strategist who has worked with the federal government since 2018, alleging that he supported a clientelist scheme for the Mexican Electricians' Union through pensions, assisted candidates during their 2024 electoral campaigns, and held meetings with Sergio Carmona, who was reportedly linked to fuel theft and organized crime.

Ni venganza ni perdón was published on 11 February 2026 in Mexico by Planeta, and received polarized reactions from politicians, with Ramírez describing it as a libelous work. Journalists have described the book as an attempt by Scherer to present his version of events. Some interpret it as an effort to demonstrate continued loyalty to AMLO, while others consider that it depicts him as politically manipulable.

== Background ==
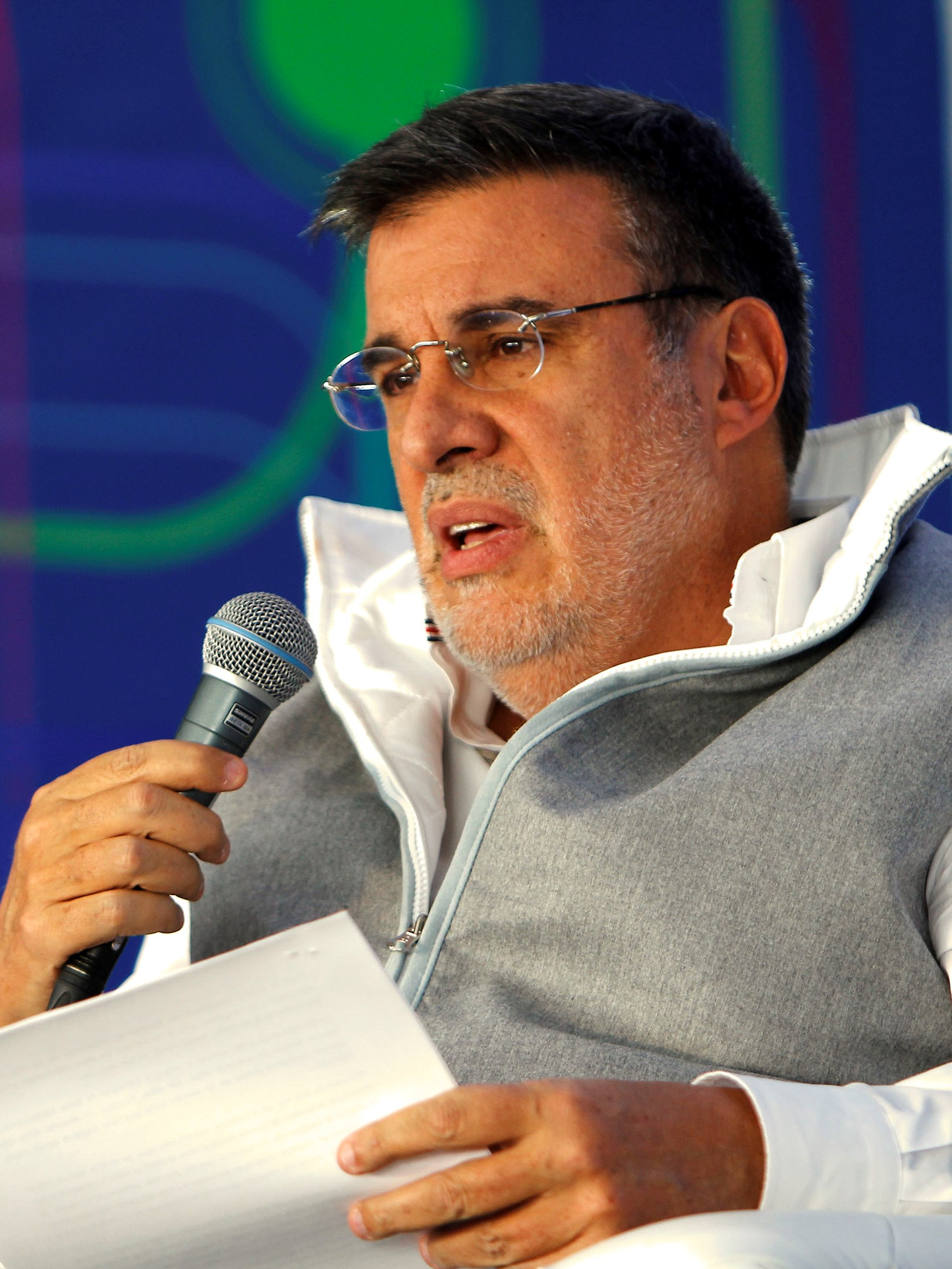
In Ni venganza ni perdón, Julio Scherer Ibarra (pictured in 2016) recounts his experiences with AMLO over nearly thirty years.

Julio Scherer Ibarra, son of Julio Scherer García, served as editor of the daily newspaper Excélsior between 1968 and 1976. He met Andrés Manuel López Obrador (AMLO) in 1997 following the death of Heberto Castillo, a politician who co-founded multiple political parties, including the Party of the Democratic Revolution (PRD), of which AMLO was also a co-founder. Journalist Jorge Fernández Menéndez, who describes Scherer Ibarra as his friend, says that the book recounts Scherer's experiences with AMLO. Fernández writes that, although they may share or differ in their views regarding AMLO, both are aware of the impact that authoritarianism had on their respective family environments. Scherer García was expelled from the editorial leadership of Excélsior following pressure from the administration of Luis Echeverría. After his departure, he founded the news magazine Proceso. Fernández adds that, besides writing the prologue of Ni venganza ni perdón, he contributed opinions with his perspective from a different vantage point than Scherer's.

== Contents ==
=== AMLO as opposition leader ===
In Ni venganza ni perdón, Scherer recounts his history with AMLO. After their meeting in 1997, Scherer portrays him as an admirer of the Cuban Revolution and a reader of the Bible who frequently cites biblical passages and applies them to political life. For example, after founding the National Regeneration Movement (Morena) as a civil association in 2011, one of the organization's slogans was "do not lie, do not steal, and do not betray the Mexican people".

Their relationship deepened after AMLO became head of government of Mexico City in 2000. Scherer characterizes him as a distrustful politician who avoided discussing sensitive matters within an office setting. After AMLO was affected by the "videoscandals"—in which businessman Carlos Ahumada was recorded giving illicit payments to associates of AMLO, including René Bejarano—Marcelo Ebrard assisted in mitigating the resulting media fallout. AMLO was later subjected to impeachment proceedings; however, he believed that imprisonment could strengthen his political position and increase his chances of eventually reaching the presidency.

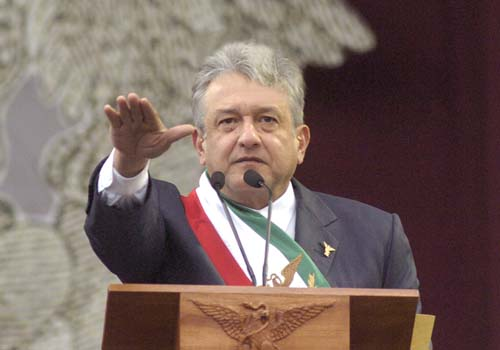
AMLO in 2006 taking the oath as "legitimate president of Mexico"; among other actions, this led to a withdrawal of support for him.

Politicians in power branded AMLO with the epithet "a danger for Mexico". His campaign team did not regard the label as detrimental to his prospects in the 2006 general election, as they considered his political base in central and southern Mexico to be strong. However, they underestimated his limited appeal in other regions of the country, including northern Mexico, where he lacked comparable levels of support. Scherer says that opinion polling did not show a definitive winner, with a technical tie between AMLO and Felipe Calderón. After losing the election, AMLO organized a peaceful protest along Paseo de la Reforma for 47 days under claims of electoral fraud. It became an demeanor that led segments of the middle and upper classes to withdraw their support for him, which Scherer states that, coupled with other actions, it contributed to reinforcing his label of "dangerous" as AMLO was perceived by voters as confrontational and driven by visceral reactions.

Aware that he lacked support from certain segments of the electorate, AMLO shifted his rhetoric in the 2012 general election toward a message centered on "peace and love". After losing again, he distanced himself from the PRD and from Dante Delgado, with whom he had previously formed an alliance through the Coalition for the Good of All and Progressive Movement political associations. AMLO subsequently founded Morena as a political party, and broke with politicians who did not support his new political project, including Miguel Ángel Mancera, the head of government of Mexico City at the time. During the 2017 state elections, AMLO tested Morena's electoral strength by nominating Delfina Gómez as the party's candidate for governor of the State of Mexico. Although she lost to Alfredo del Mazo Maza, the results indicated growing support for Morena in the state.

=== Presidency of AMLO ===
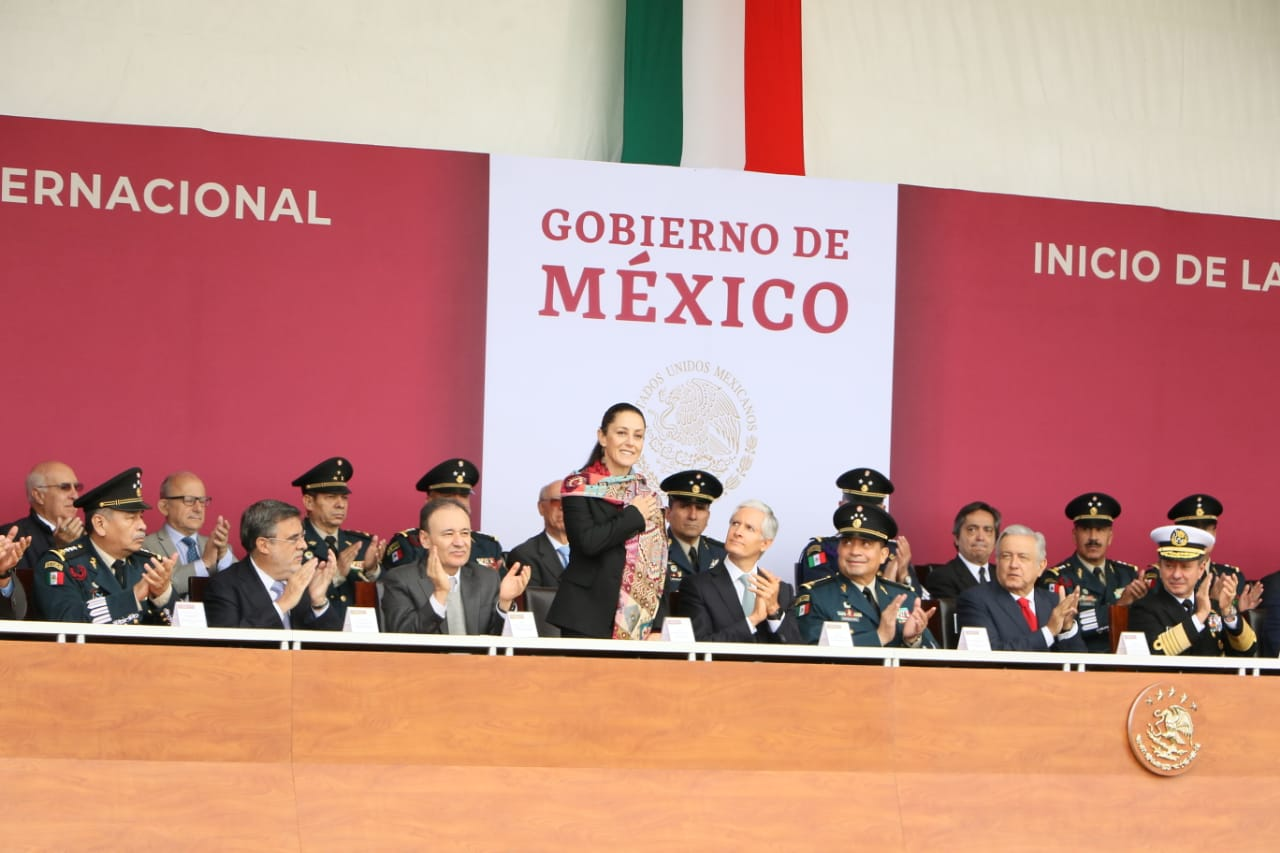

1 / Scherer Ibarra	2 / López Obrador

After winning the 2018 general election, AMLO appointed Scherer as legal counsel. The position, which oversees the legal affairs of the federal government and advises the president on constitutional and legislative matters, placed him among the most influential officials in the administration.

Scherer writes that AMLO began exercising power before formally taking office, as President Enrique Peña Nieto, in his account, "erased himself" during the final stage of his administration. He states that, prior to being sworn in, AMLO had already decided to cancel the New Mexico City International Airport and to maintain military personnel in public security tasks, despite earlier statements that they would be withdrawn from the streets. Scherer frames the later decision as evidence that AMLO was more flexible in practice than he publicly appeared.

During the first three years of his presidency, AMLO oversees the establishment of the National Guard, his interactions with the Supreme Court and its president at the time, Arturo Zaldívar, the government's handling of the COVID-19 pandemic, as well as the attempted assassination attack against Omar García Harfuch, and the case of General Salvador Cienfuegos.

In 2021, journalist investigations claimed that Scherer created and operated an extortion and influence-peddling network since 2019. According to these reports, he contacted law firms with which he had been associated and approached businesspeople involved in ongoing litigation, offering to assist them with their cases. In exchange, they were required to pay substantial sums—reportedly at least US$1 million. Those who agreed were allegedly promised that their litigation would be resolved, while those who refused were said to face the opening of additional investigations. In either case, the businesspeople continued to be subject to official inquiries. The Office of the Attorney General, then headed by Alejandro Gertz Manero, subsequently opened an investigation into Scherer, and Olga Sánchez Cordero, then Secretary of the Interior, notified AMLO.

Scherer quit on 2 September 2021. In the book, he recounts that, at one point, AMLO had told him: "When I leave office, they will come after you. Don't doubt it. Power does not forgive. They will pursue you, fabricate things about you, and try to destroy you. Prepare yourself, because they will distort what they know and use whatever they invent. And they will do so with malice".

=== Criticism of AMLO's cabinet ===
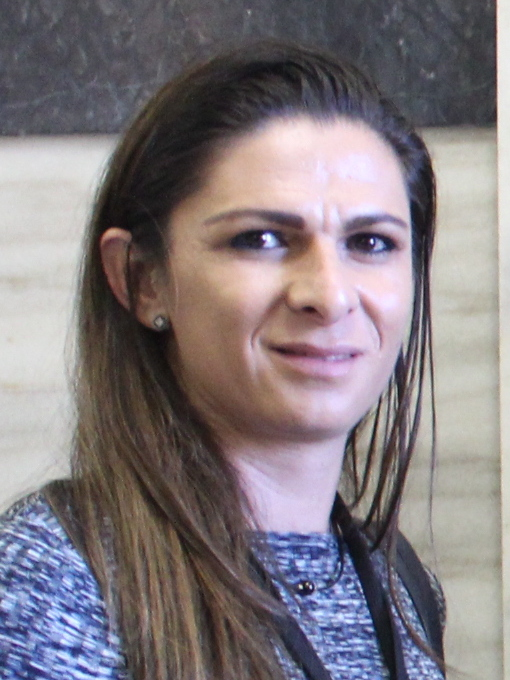
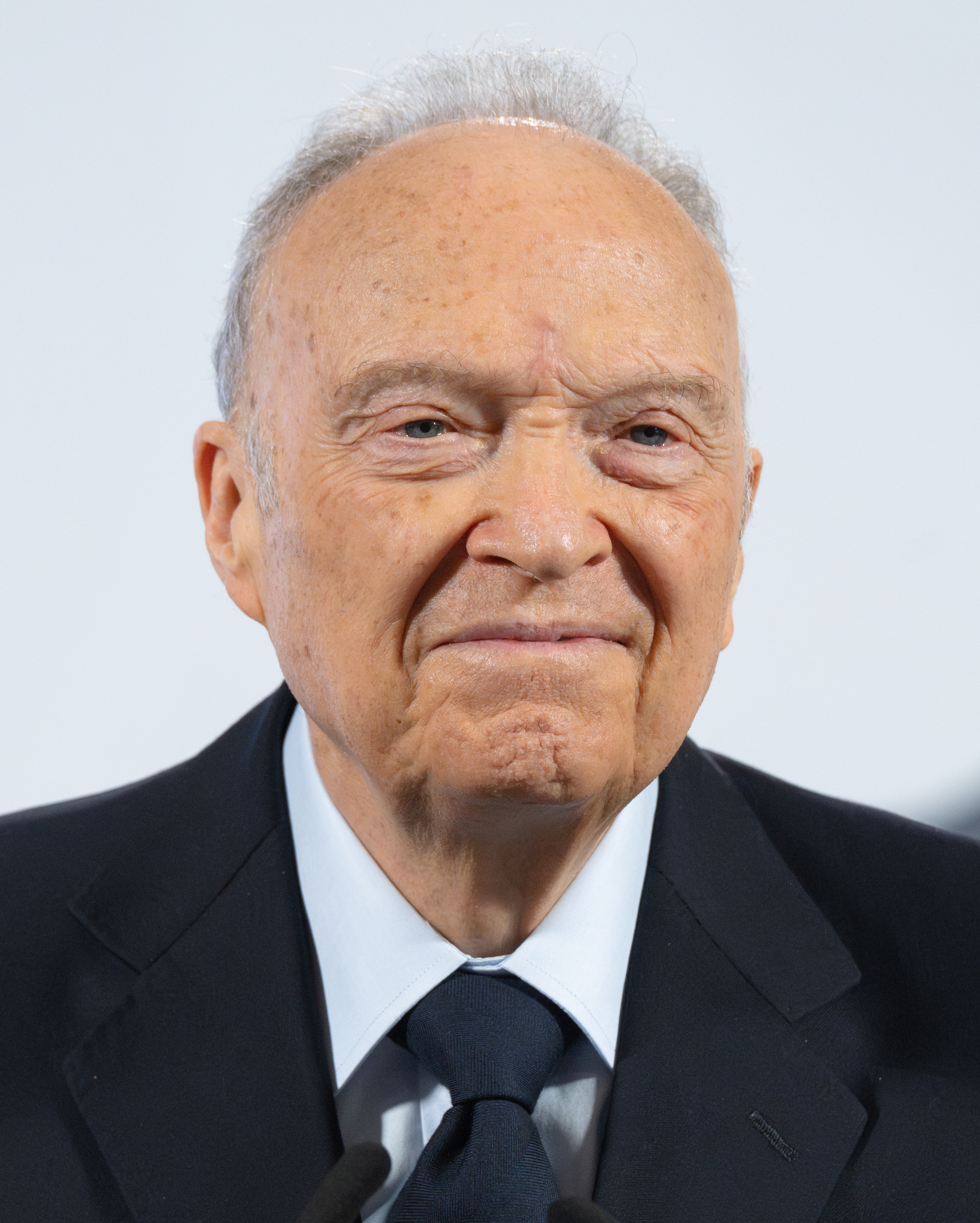
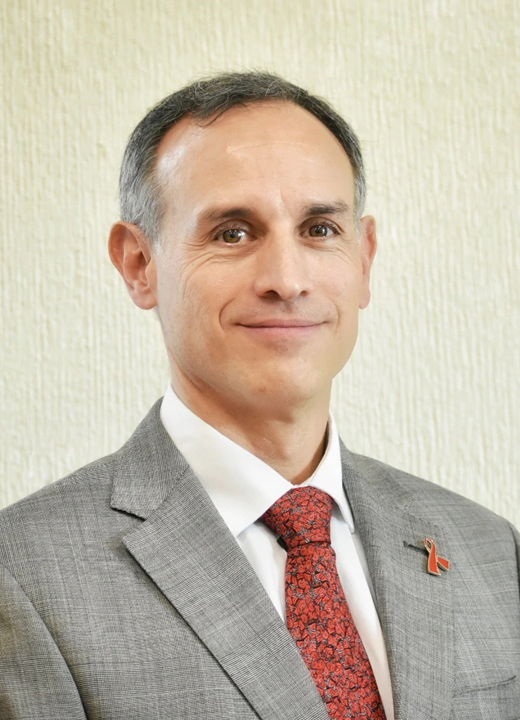
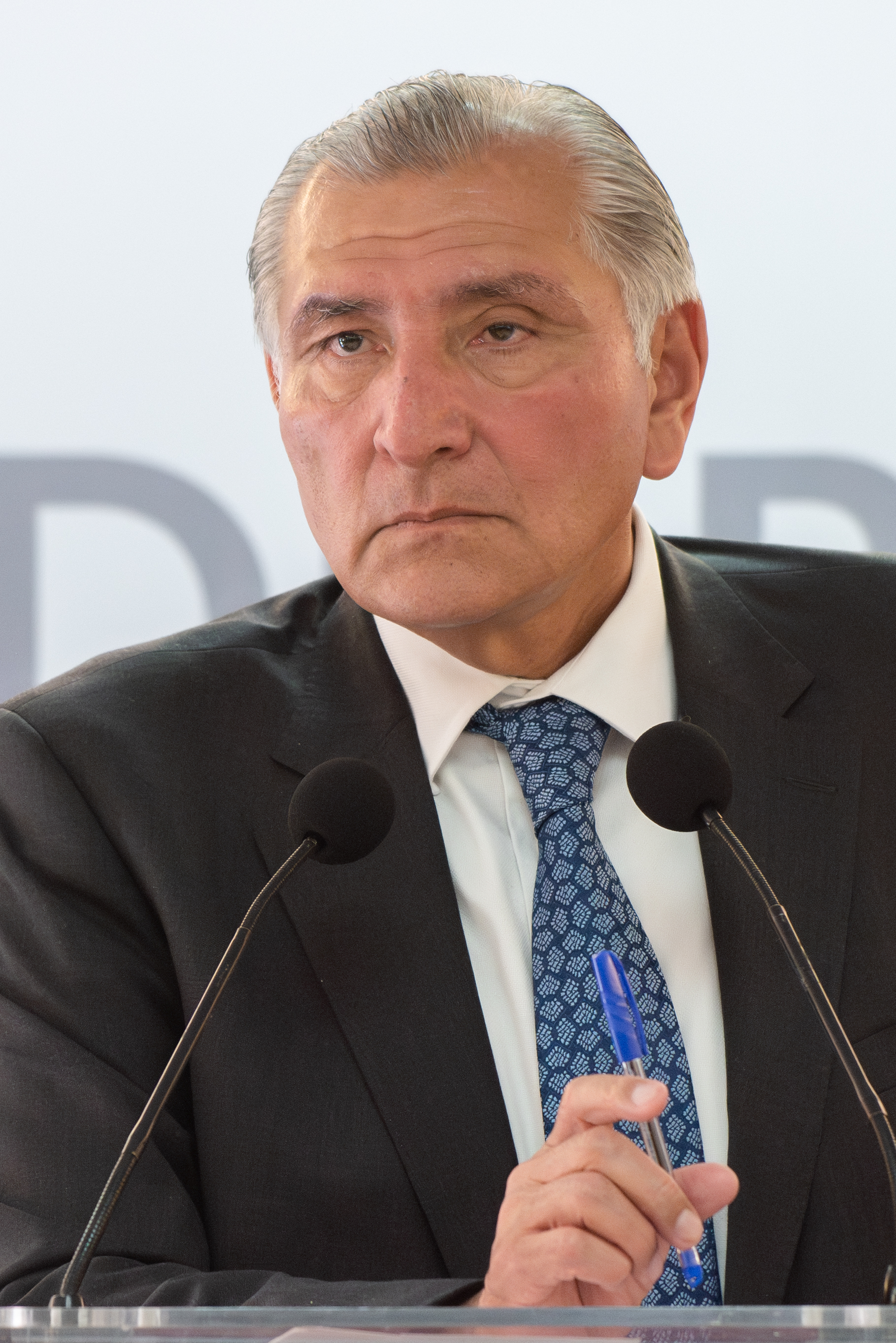
Politicians mentioned in the book include, clockwise from upper left: Ana Gabriela Guevara, Alejandro Gertz Manero, Adán Augusto López, and Hugo López-Gatell.

In Ni venganza ni perdón, Scherer centers his account on AMLO's cabinet. He refers to a rule of thumb the president articulated, paraphrased as "90 percent loyalty and 10 percent capacity", in relation to several appointments to agencies for which the appointees lacked expertise or relevant experience. Among the examples he mentions are Alfonso Durazo as Secretary of Security and Civilian Protection and Ana Gabriela Guevara as head of National Commission for Physical Culture and Sport. Regarding Hugo López-Gatell, Deputy Secretary of Prevention and Health Promotion, Scherer states that he chose to disregard scientific criteria in order to avoid contradicting AMLO, which, in his account, resulted in thousands of preventable deaths during the COVID-19 pandemic. He also writes that López-Gatell caused delays in regulatory approvals within the Federal Commission for the Protection against Sanitary Risk.

Scherer also writes that Sánchez Cordero was selected, in his assessment, to satisfy a gender quota; that Germán Martínez was named director general of the Mexican Social Security Institute after not being picked as attorney general; and that the choosing of Manuel Bartlett as director of the Federal Electricity Commission was a mistake. Scherer assigns responsibility to him for deficiencies in the electricity sector and for the decline in foreign investment, which he attributes to Bartlett's personal views on the industry and his approach to energy policy.

==== Alejandro Gertz Manero ====
Regarding Gertz Manero, Scherer characterizes the Office of the Attorney General as "sinister", and alleges that AMLO selected him for the position one day before being sworn in as president, after the suggestion of Scherer and Durazo. He also writes that María Elena Álvarez-Buylla Roces, director of the National Council of Sciences and Technologies, sought to have researchers within the institution prosecuted after they refused to grant Gertz Manero Level III status in the National System of Researchers.

Scherer alleges that Gertz Manero used his position for personal benefit. He further claims that, after a relative of Scherer became involved in a legal matter, Gertz Manero sought to block a writ of amparo and leaked documents to the media in an effort to damage his reputation.

==== Adán Augusto López ====
Scherer mentions that AMLO requested Adán Augusto López Hernández, Sánchez Cordero's successor as Secretary of the Interior, to mediate the conflict between Scherer and Gertz. After their meeting, Scherer states that he did not regard López Hernández as acting in the capacity of a genuine interior secretary, as he believed there was no intention to resolve the conflict. He recounts saying: "I never imagined a secretary that, in order to resolve an issue requested by his boss, ended speaking in good faith".

Scherer also portrays López Hernández as a hardline political operator, willing to break norms in order to achieve his objectives, and writes that during his tenure as governor of Tabasco he governed "as he pleased". On environmental matters, Scherer states that López Hernández and Rocío Nahle, then Secretary of Energy, bypassed environmental permits in order to clear mangroves in the state. He further writes that López Hernández requested that major infrastructure projects such as the Dos Bocas Refinery and the Tren Maya proceed without public bidding and instead be awarded through direct contracts.

==== Jesús Ramírez Cuevas ====
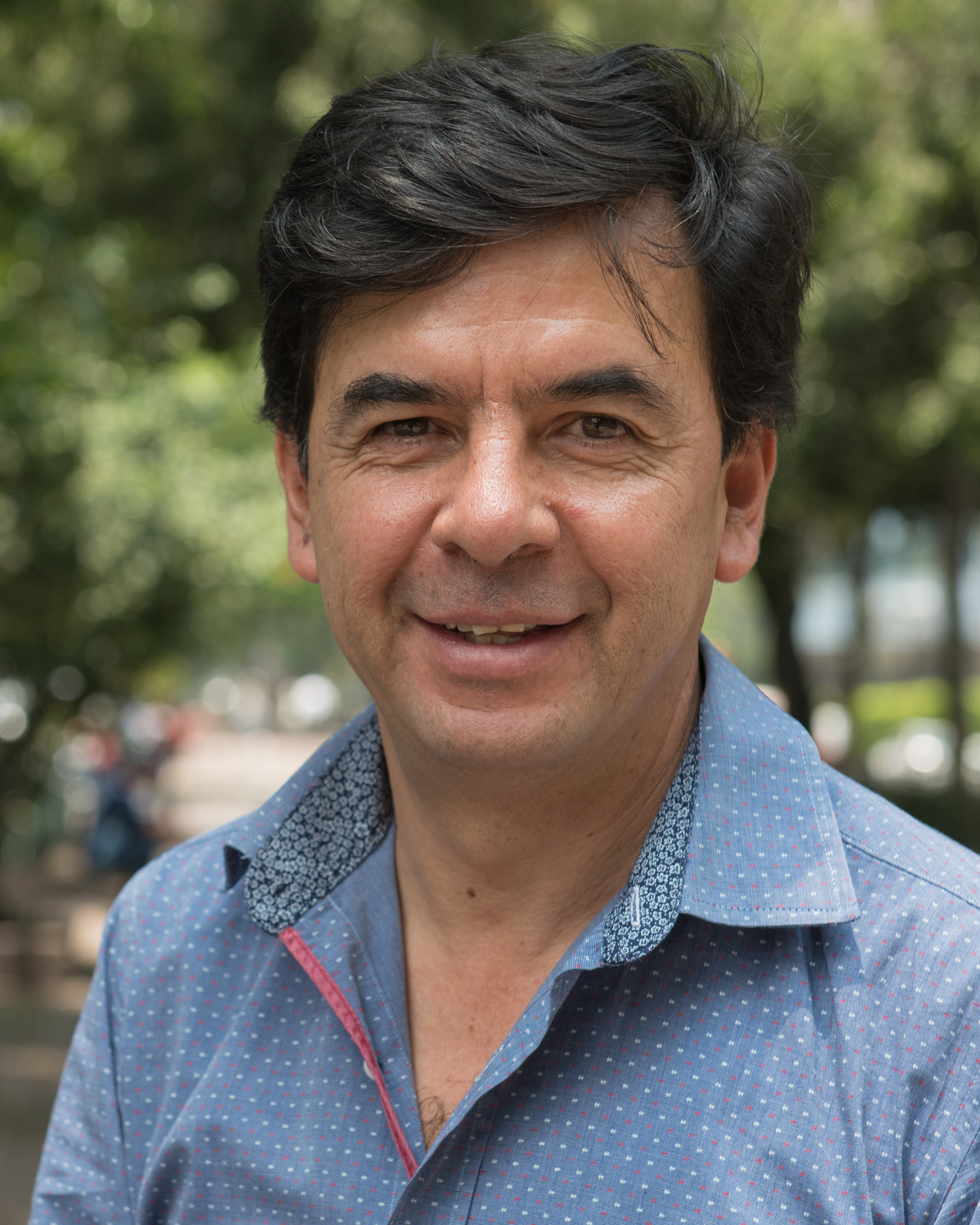
The book focuses on alleged acts of corruption by Ramírez Cuevas (pictured), who in response deemed it libellous.

About Jesús Ramírez Cuevas, General Coordinator of Social Communication and Spokesperson of the Government during AMLO's presidency, Scherer alleges that he established a clientelist arrangement benefiting members of the Mexican Electricians' Union, particularly former employees of Luz y Fuerza del Centro (LyFC), dissolved in 2009. According to Scherer, these workers received a "lifetime compensation" framed as an act of social justice, generating a fiscal liability of nearly MX$27 billion. In 2025, Raquel Buenrostro, head of the Secretariat of Anticorruption and Good Governance, stated that former LyFC employees were receiving pensions 140 times higher than the national average and that the issue was under investigation. Scherer further alleges that Ramírez Cuevas assisted gubernatorial candidates during the 2024 local elections, including Américo Villarreal Anaya in Tamaulipas and Clara Brugada in Mexico City. He writes that part of the funds allocated to former employees of LyFC ultimately ended up in Brugada's campaign.

Scherer further writes that, according to intelligence documents, Ramírez allegedly associated with Sergio Carmona Angulo, described as the "king of huachicol" (a Mexican Spanish term for fuel theft). According to the book, Ramírez and Carmona met on multiple occasions, and Carmona assisted in financing political candidacies and facilitating links with organized crime networks. Scherer adds that Ramírez allegedly introduced Carmona to Mario Delgado, then president of Morena, and later to AMLO, and that these meetings were significant for financing campaigns in Tamaulipas, Sinaloa, and Sonora in 2018. Carmona was brother of Julio Carmona, appointed director of customs in Reynosa in 2015. From that point on, a network was allegedly established to evade taxes through false invoices and shell companies; by 2020, it reportedly controlled one third of the country's illicit market. Sergio was killed in San Pedro Garza García in 2021. Scherer claims Ramírez's name appears in New York and Texas court documents attached to investigations into money laundering and electoral financing.

Scherer adds that Ramírez also allegedly derived personal benefits from his position. During AMLO's morning press briefings, colloquially known as La mañanera, Ramírez was responsible for assisting the president with requests for videos or graphics used to respond to reporters. According to Scherer, AMLO would, "with naivety", answer questions that Ramírez channeled to him through compliant reporters, arguing that only a small number of journalists were not aligned with the government. Scherer further alleges that Ramírez created a structure through which billions of pesos in government advertising were allocated via Doble L Medios, owned by an alleged associate, which operates the news portal Contrapunto.com and the newspaper Regeneración, the latter founded by Ramírez.

== Release and reception ==
On 24 September 2024, Scherer sent two letters, one to AMLO and another to his successor, Claudia Sheinbaum, informing them that he would seek to clear his name. He also announced that he would file lawsuits against individuals he said had defamed him.

Grupo Planeta released Ni venganza ni perdón in Mexico on 11 February 2026. The book includes multiple QR codes that allow readers to consult documents and investigative materials cited in support of Scherer's claims.

=== Politicians' responses ===
"What disloyalty from that man. I'm going to say it plainly, I'm not going to hold back, Julio Scherer Ibarra should be in jail. I held him in high regard [...] The president appointed him as legal counsel, and from that position he had considerable power. I heard many things and said nothing, and now he comes out with this book, with lies and absolute disloyalty" — Senator Gerardo Fernández Noroña.

Ramírez published a response letter in which he called Ni venganza ni perdón a "filthy pasquinade", characterizing it as libelous and as a "disguised attack against the Fourth Transformation movement", and rejecting all the statements attributed by Scherer. He said the book lacks evidence and compared it to ¡El Móndrigo! Bitácora del Consejo Nacional de Huelga (1969), a propaganda publication issued by the government of Mexico that sought to justify the 1968 Tlatelolco massacre.

Multiple politicians from Morena supported Ramírez. Luisa Alcalde, president of Morena, said Ramírez has contributed to the party after founding Regeneración, which helped to "reverse the lies of the right wing". Senator Guadalupe Chavira de la Rosa called Scherer "ungrateful" and the book "a cheap novel". Senator Gerardo Fernández Noroña said that Scherer should be imprisoned for his reported corruption. He also questioned the allegation that Brugada had won through fraud and stated that the pension granted to former workers of LyFC resulted "from years of resistance".

Durazo contacted Scherer and asked him to clarify publicly that, when referring to Sonora, he was not alluding to Durazo's governorship since 2021. Scherer replied that "a complete reading" of the book clarifies that he was referring to 2018. Brugada rejected Scherer's allegations, describing them as an attempt to discredit rather than a documented complaint. Nahle said the publication shows "disloyalty to [AMLO] and the country". When asked if the Secretariat of Anticorruption and Good Governance would conduct oversight of the claims, Buenrostro said that "when there is information and it is considered relevant, investigations can be initiated ex officio. When there is no information, only an allegation, it becomes complicated", and urged Scherer to file a formal complaint, adding that "the narrative is not sufficient".

President Sheinbaum refused reading the book, because "criticism and self-criticism are always important [...] but we are part of a movement [...] we must always be consistent [...] because we are not here for power, and no one imposed us except the people". She added that the book would not have any impact and that there was no need to conduct an inquiry into Scherer. She also urged the media to investigate Genaro García Luna instead, who served as head of the Secretariat of Public Security during Calderón's presidency and was arrested and imprisoned in the United States on drug trafficking charges.

Opposition politicians that requested inquiries included Ricardo Anaya, the National Action Party (PAN) coordinator in the Senate, who described the allegations as "serious", and requested that investigations be launched regardless of whether Scherer files an official complaint, adding that failure to do so would confirm complicity, and Senator Karla Toledo Zamora, from the Institutional Revolutionary Party (PRI), who requested that Delgado and Ramírez be summoned to appear before the Senate. PAN Deputies Federico Döring and Ángel Rodríguez filed a complaint before the Office of the Attorney General alleging possible offenses, including criminal association, unlawful exercise of public service, abuse of authority, and influence peddling, against several politicians mentioned in the book. Adriana Dávila Fernández, invited to write an opinion piece in El Heraldo de México, noted that in the book's prologue Fernández Menéndez recalls journalists such as Scherer García and Manuel Becerra Acosta (father of journalist Juan Becerra Acosta), who were stigmatized by Echeverría during his presidency. She describes his period as authoritarian and populist, labeling "ironic" that the journalists' sons now "actively participate in the regime's propaganda", concluding that "history does not only repeat itself; it mocks us".

=== Journalists' opinions ===
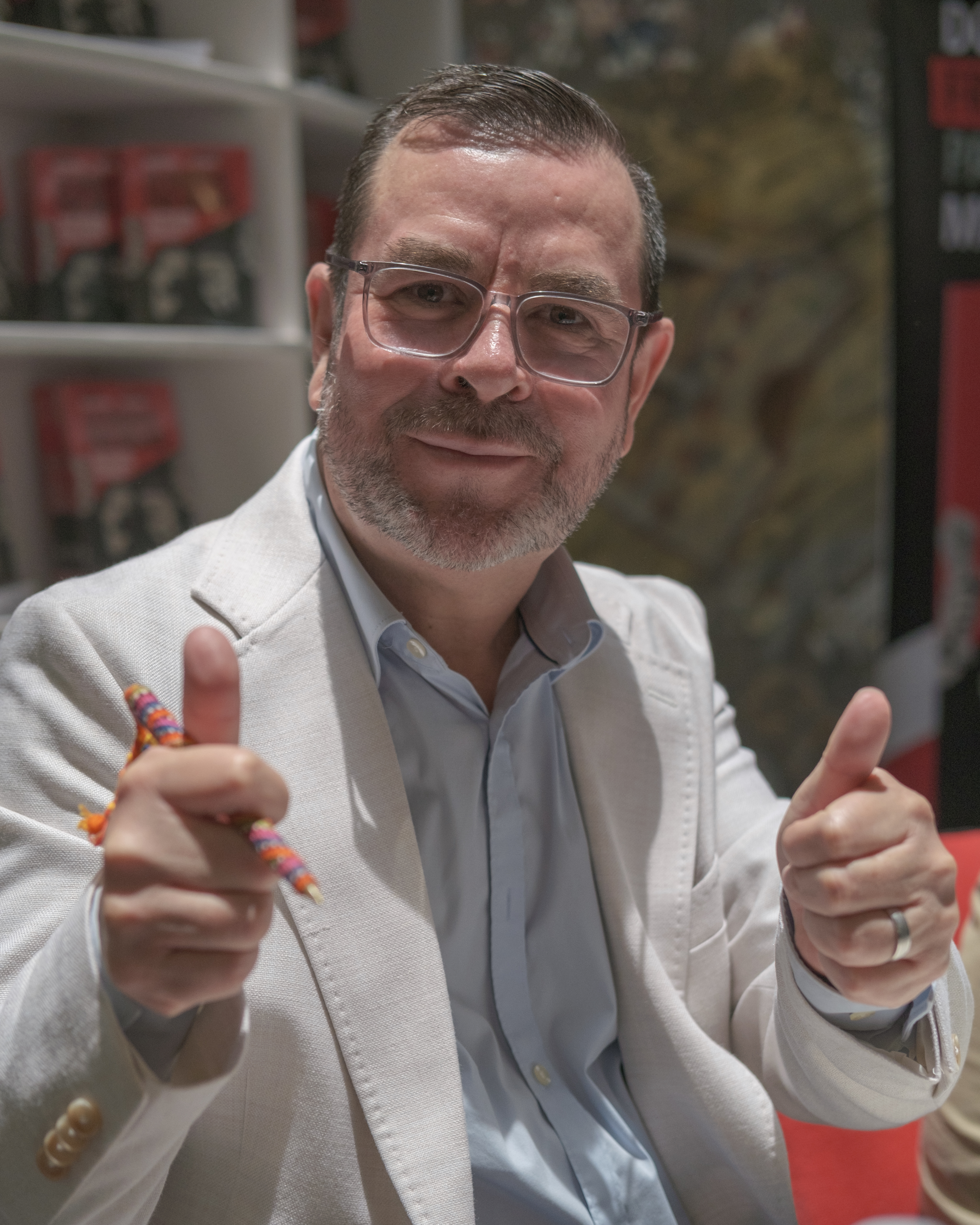
Journalist Álvaro Delgado (pictured) considers the book to portray AMLO as politically manipulable.

Ivabelle Arroyo from Letras Libres considers that Ni venganza ni perdón is narrated as a chronicle "from a managerial perspective", describing government work and Scherer's time in office without focusing on aspects criticized during AMLO's administration, such as the militarization of government and democratic backsliding. She adds that Scherer seeks to maintain a loyal tone toward AMLO in the book and that a more critical account of him would not necessarily have been better, as it might not have reflected what the author experienced and how he understood it. Sergio Sarmiento says that Scherer recounts his time in the cabinet with affection and without expressing regret about his participation. Guillermo Ortega Ruiz names it a "rough X-ray" of AMLO's presidency seen from within rather than from an outsider's perspective, pointing to internal conflicts that had remained out of public view. He agreed that if Ramírez believes the book defamatory, he should file a civil suit for moral injury against Scherer.

In his op-ed for El Universal, Carlos Loret de Mola portrays the book as "a declaration of war" ahead of the 2030 general election, stating that it praises García Harfuch, a potential candidate, while criticizing his possible rivals, adding that although García Harfuch won the survey to determine the candidate for head of government of Mexico City, Brugada was ultimately selected instead by AMLO due to an "aversion" toward him. Loret de Mola mentions that Scherer characterizes AMLO's administration as "disorderly, without method, where irresponsibility prevails", adding that although this was "already known", the statements carry weight because they come from an insider rather than from a journalist, an opposition politician, or a foreign country. For him, the book recounts how several government actions were undertaken in an improvised manner, ranging from relatively minor initiatives, such as the failure of creating a baseball academy, to major projects, including the Dos Bocas Refinery, the Felipe Ángeles International Airport, the Tren Maya, and the Interoceanic Corridor of the Isthmus of Tehuantepec, among others.

Marco Levario Turcott, director of the magazine Etcétera, similarly stated that the book presents García Harfuch in a favorable light, while describing AMLO as "manipulable" and "egotistical". Likewise, Álvaro Delgado feels that Scherer portrays AMLO as "inept, ignorant, manipulable, and prone to victimization". According to Carlos Bravo Regidor, the book centers on how AMLO fostered a personality cult that prioritized the leader's charisma over policy outcomes. He states that it also addresses the growing empowerment of the armed forces, which AMLO perceives as disciplined and effective in contrast to civil society, and the assignment of major projects to them without transparency on the basis of loyalty. Additionally, he argues that the book describes the selective application of laws, becoming stricter when aligned with the government's interests and more flexible when not, and characterizes the transformation of the Supreme Court from a counterweight into an ally.

In an opinion piece for La Crónica de Hoy, Rafael Cardona Sandoval was critical of Scherer, stating that his work did not stand out for its criticism or self-criticism, but rather for what he described as "indiscretion". Denise Dresser stated that Scherer seeks to justify both himself and AMLO by arguing that others misled the president. She added that, in her view, the book indirectly reveals Scherer's own complicity by endorsing actions she characterizes as illegal and unconstitutional, which led to "economic ignorance, political voluntarism, and factional loyalty" during the administration.

=== Aftermath ===
Following the publication of Ni venganza ni perdón, President Sheinbaum announced a reform initiative to Article 127 of the Constitution concerning high public pensions, including those of LyFC ex-employees, proposing a cap of MX$70,000.
