= Mendes (disambiguation) =

Mendes is the Greek name for the ancient Egyptian city of Djedet.

Mendes may also refer to:

- Cândido Mendes, Maranhão, a city in Brazil
- Mendes (name), a Portuguese surname
- Mendes, Rio de Janeiro, a municipality in Rio de Janeiro, Brazil
- Benveniste/Mendes family were prominent in 11th to 15th century France, Portugal and Spain.

== See also ==
- Mendez (disambiguation)
- Mendis (disambiguation)
- Mentes (disambiguation)
- Menderes (disambiguation)
