= Mendez =

Méndez
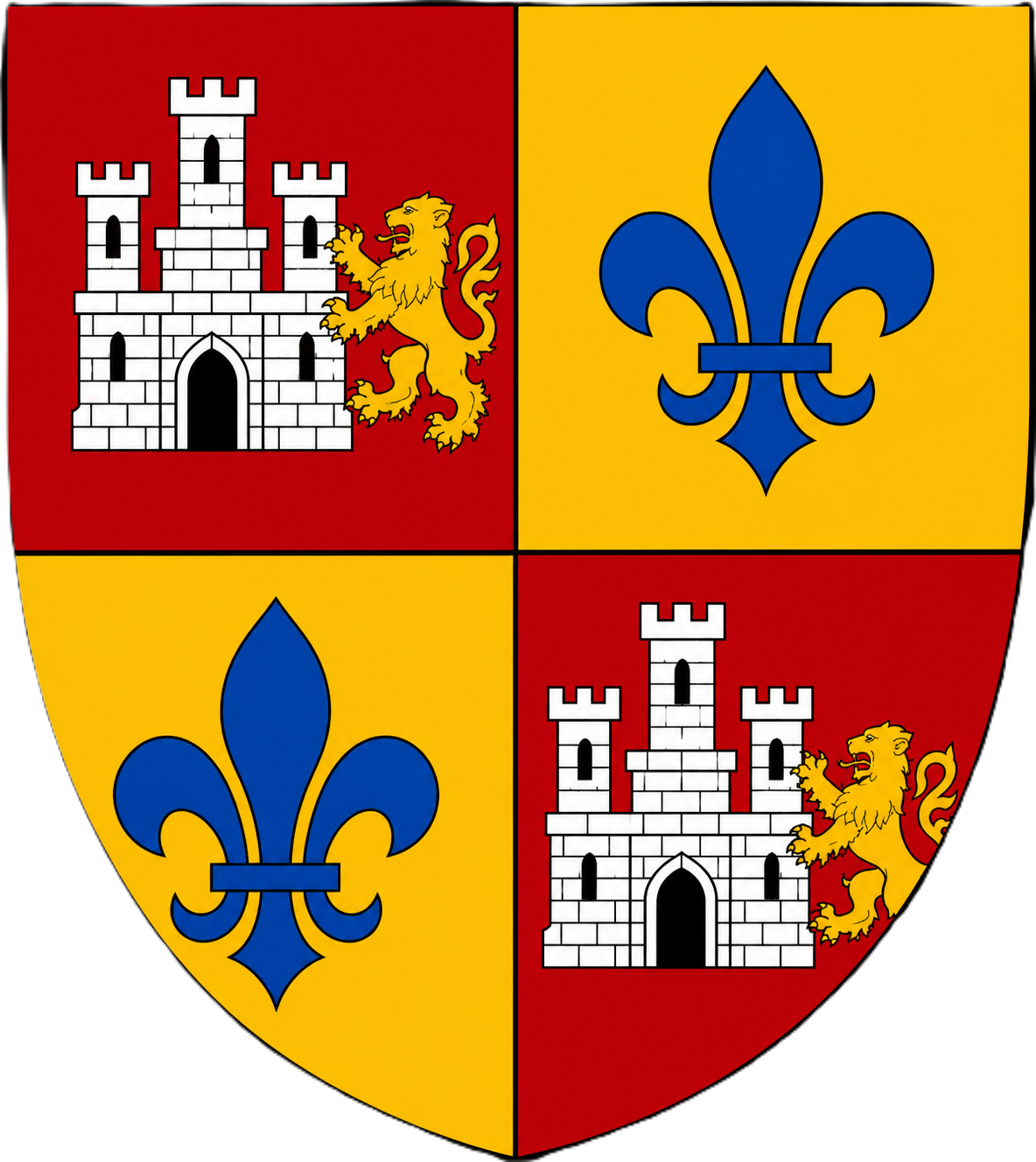
- Coat of arms of an Hidalgo family named Méndez
- Pronunciation: /ˈmɛndɛz/ Spanish: [ˈmendeθ] Latin America: [ˈmendez]

Origin
- Language: Spanish
- Meaning: "son of Mendo"
- Region of origin: Celanova (Galicia)

Other names
- Variant form: Mendes (Portuguese)
- Derived: Hermenegild (Germanic)

Méndez or Mendez is a patronymic surname of Spanish origin and Germanic roots, meaning "Son of Mendo, Menendo, Mendel or Mem". Because it is a derived form of the original german name 'Hermenegild', most likely because of the period in which the Visigoths ruled in Spain, it shares most of its original etymology (ermen for "whole, immense" and gild for "sacrifice, treasure").

Méndez is a common surname in Spain, México and other countries in Latin America.

Longer forms sharing the same root are Meléndez and Menéndez, while its Portuguese and Galician equivalent is Mendes.

== General ==
- Ana G. Méndez (1908–1997), Puerto Rican educator
- Ángel Rivero Méndez (1856–1930), Puerto Rican soldier, writer, journalist and businessman
- Arnaldo Tamayo Méndez (born 1942), Cuban cosmonaut
- Emilio Méndez Pérez (born 1949), Spanish physicist
- Jonna Mendez, (born 1945), American CIA official
- Juan E. Méndez (born 1944), Argentine lawyer and academic
- Miguel A. García Méndez (1902–1998), Puerto Rican businessman, lawyer, statesman and banker
- Tony Mendez, American CIA officer
- Willians Mendez Suarez, Cuban Anglican bishop

== Arts ==
- Antonio Tobias Mendez (born 1963), American sculptor
- Conny Méndez (1898–1979), Venezuelan composer, singer, writer, caricaturist and actress
- Dalila Paola Méndez (born 1975), American artist
- Denny Méndez (born 1978), Dominican model and actress
- DJ Méndez (born 1975), Chilean-Swedish producer, singer and DJ
- Erica Mendez, American anime dubbing actor
- Francisco Méndez (1907–1962), Guatemalan poet and short-story writer
- Gaspar Méndez (fl.1546), Spanish architect of Badajoz
- Greta Mendez (born 1954), Trinidadian dancer, choreographer and carnivalist
- Lester Mendez, American record producer and songwriter
- Lucía Méndez (born 1951), Mexican actress and singer
- Luis Fernando Castillo Mendez (1922–2009), Brazilian Catholic priest and patriarch
- Marco Méndez (born 1976), Mexican actor
- Martin Mendez (born 1978), Uruguayan musician
- Nora Méndez (born 1969), Salvadoran poet
- Rafael Méndez (1906–1981), American musician and composer
- Rebeca Mendez (born 1962), American artist and designer
- Ryan Mendez (guitarist), American musician
- Tomás Méndez (1927–1995), Mexican composer and singer

== Politics and military ==
- Aparicio Méndez (1904–1988), Uruguayan politician
- Casto Méndez Núñez (1824–1869), Spanish military naval officer
- Eulalia Jiménez Méndez (born 1891), Mexican revolutionary
- Gaspar Méndez de Haro, 7th Marquis of Carpio (1629–1687), Spanish politician and art collector
- Íñigo Méndez de Vigo (born 1956), Spanish politician
- Juan N. Méndez (1820–1894), Mexican general and politician
- Kevin Mendez, Belizean LGBTQ rights activist
- Louis Gonzaga Mendez Jr. (1915–2001), American army officer
- Manuel A. Garcia Mendez, Puerto Rican businessman, lawyer and politician
- Gonzalo Méndez de Cancio (c. 1554 –1622), Governor of Spanish Florida
- Marco Aurelio Robles Méndez (1905–1990), Panamanian politician and President
- Miguel Abadía Méndez (1867–1947), Colombian politician
- Nicanor Costa Méndez, Argentine politician
- Olga A. Méndez (1925–2009), Puerto Rican politician
- Rafael de Nogales Méndez (1879–1936), Venezuelan mercenary
- Rosie Méndez, American politician
- Santiago Méndez (1790–1870), Mexican politician
- Sylvia Mendez (born 1936), American civil rights activist
- Teodoro A. Dehesa Méndez (1848–1936), Mexican politician

== Sports ==
- Alexis Méndez (born 1969), Venezuelan track and road cyclist
- AJ Mendez (born 1987), American actress, author and professional wrestler better known as AJ Lee
- Bruno Méndez (born 1999), Uruguayan footballer
- Carlos Méndez (baseball) (born 1974), Venezuelan baseball player
- Donaldo Méndez (born 1978), American baseball player
- Édgar Méndez (born 1990), Spanish footballer
- Edison Méndez (born 1979), Ecuadorian footballer
- Federico Méndez (born 1972), Argentine rugby player
- Gabriel Mendez (born 1973), Australian footballer
- Gustavo Méndez (born 1971), Uruguayan footballer
- Gustavo Méndez (referee) (born 1967), Uruguayan football referee
- Héctor Méndez (boxer) (1897–1977), Argentine boxer
- Héctor Méndez (rugby union), Argentine rugby football player and coach
- José Méndez (1887–1928), American baseball player and manager
- Juan Mendez (born 1981), American basketball player
- Judith Méndez (born 1981), Dominican Republic heptathlete
- Limberg Méndez (born 1973), Bolivian football player
- Maria Méndez (born 2001), Spanish footballer
- Mario Méndez (Mexican footballer) (born 1979)
- Mario Méndez (Panamanian footballer) (born 1977)
- Mayte Méndez (1961–2024), Spanish basketball coach
- Norberto Doroteo Méndez (1923–1998), Argentine footballer
- Rómulo Méndez (1938–2022), Guatemalan football referee
- Ronald Méndez (born 1982), Venezuelan volleyball player
- Ryan Mendez (basketball), American basketball player
- Sebas Méndez (born 1997), Ecuadorian footballer
- Sebastián Méndez (born 1977), Argentine footballer

== See also ==
- Benveniste/Mendes family were prominent in 11th to 15th century France, Portugal and Spain.
