= Meléndez-Torres =

Meléndez-Torres is a surname. Notable people with the surname include:

- Coleta Meléndez Torres (1885–1917), Mexican religious sister and candidate for canonisation
- Gerardo J. Meléndez-Torres, Professor of Clinical and Social Epidemiology

== See also ==
- Meléndez
- Torres (surname)
