= 2025 Mexican fuel smuggling scandal =

2025 fuel-smuggling and corruption scandal in the Mexican Navy

The 2025 Mexican fuel smuggling scandal, also called the huachicol fiscal scandal, was a corruption and fuel-smuggling case in Mexico in which senior officers of the Secretariat of the Navy (SEMAR), customs officials, and private businesses were accused of importing fuel under false tariff classifications to evade taxes. The network reclassified diesel as lower-taxed or tax-exempt petrochemical products such as lubricant additives, a practice known as huachicol fiscal (fiscal fuel theft), and laundered its proceeds through dozens of shell companies. Investigators estimated that the scheme defrauded the Mexican treasury of billions of dollars in unpaid duties.

The investigation had its origin in a complaint made in June 2024 by Rear Admiral Fernando Rubén Guerrero Alcántar, who was shot dead in Manzanillo five months later. The case became public after the Navy seized the oil tanker Challenge Procyon at the port of Tampico, Tamaulipas, in March 2025. The shipment, declared as oil additives, was found to contain diesel, exposing a network that prosecutors said had operated since at least 2023. The investigation implicated Vice Admiral Manuel Roberto Farías Laguna and his brother, Rear Admiral Fernando Farías Laguna, both nephews of Admiral José Rafael Ojeda Durán, who had served as Secretary of the Navy from 2018 to 2024.

In September 2025, federal authorities arrested fourteen people—including active and retired naval officers, former customs officials, and business executives—and said they were seeking more than 200 additional arrest warrants. Two officials linked to the case died in September 2025, and a retired captain, Miguel Ángel Solano Ruiz, became a fugitive and a suspect in both deaths. Fernando Farías Laguna fled to Argentina, where he was arrested in April 2026, and was returned to Mexico that August.

== Background ==
=== Huachicol fiscal ===
Huachicol fiscal is the importation of fuel under false customs declarations to avoid Mexican taxes, principally the Special Tax on Production and Services (IEPS). Because Mexican retail fuel prices, which include the IEPS, are higher than international prices, importers can profit by buying gasoline or diesel abroad—often in the United States—and declaring it on arrival as a product with lower or no duty, such as lubricants or additives. Reporting has described fiscal fuel theft as one of the largest sources of revenue loss for the Mexican state, citing cumulative losses during the López Obrador administration of around 500 billion pesos (about US$24.5 billion).

=== Militarization of ports and customs ===
In 2020, President Andrés Manuel López Obrador announced the transfer of Mexico's ports and customs administration to the armed forces, arguing that military oversight would reduce corruption among civilian officials. By 2022, port and customs operations had been placed under the control of the Secretariat of the Navy.

== Origins ==
In June 2024, Rear Admiral Fernando Rubén Guerrero Alcántar, a former director general of customs collection, wrote to Secretary of the Navy José Rafael Ojeda Durán alleging that Vice Admiral Manuel Roberto Farías Laguna was manipulating the assignment of naval personnel to customs posts in order to sustain a criminal operation, and naming retired captain Miguel Ángel Solano Ruiz and Clímaco Aldape Utrera as its operators. On 10 October 2024 he presented the same allegations to the incoming Secretary of the Navy, Raymundo Morales Ángeles.

Guerrero Alcántar was shot dead in Manzanillo, Colima, on 8 November 2024. The FGR treated the killing as connected to his allegations, and investigators noted that he had given his exact whereabouts only to naval personnel. His death, and that of an FGR employee, Magaly Janet Nava Ramos, killed in a similar manner on 21 October 2024, prompted the wider inquiry into customs corruption. The FGR said it had opened its investigation in 2024, after navy secretary Raymundo Morales Ángeles passed initial findings to Attorney General Alejandro Gertz Manero.

The investigation became public on 31 March 2025, when Secretary of Security Omar García Harfuch announced that the Secretariat of the Navy (SEMAR) had seized the tanker Challenge Procyon at the port of Tampico on 19 March. According to García Harfuch, the vessel was carrying approximately 10 million litres (about 63,000 barrels) of diesel that had been declared to customs as oil additives.

Accounts of the cargo's size have differed. SEMAR reported about 10 million litres, and the FGR later described the seizure as about 8 million litres at Altamira. Documents obtained by the investigative organization Mexicans Against Corruption and Impunity (MCCI) indicated that the tanker had carried about 20 million litres of diesel disguised as industrial additives, twice the volume SEMAR reported publicly. The importing company, Intanza, later sued for the return of the full 20 million litres, a discrepancy suggesting that roughly half the cargo may have been unloaded without official record and raising questions about naval supervision at the port.

== The network ==
=== Key figures ===
The investigation centered on Vice Admiral Manuel Roberto Farías Laguna and his brother, Rear Admiral Fernando Farías Laguna, who held senior positions within SEMAR and were nephews of Admiral José Rafael Ojeda Durán, Secretary of the Navy from 2018 to 2024 under President Andrés Manuel López Obrador. Prosecutors alleged that the brothers had directed the bribery ring at Tampico since at least 2023, coordinating with customs officials to allow contraband tankers to pass in exchange for bribes.

The FGR also identified retired captain Miguel Ángel Solano Ruiz, known as "El Capitán Sol"—once an officer engaged in fighting organized crime, later described by the press as a "king of huachicol"—as a principal operator of the network in the customs offices of Altamira, Tampico, and Guaymas, and as a liaison to the brothers. The Financial Intelligence Unit documented 79 deposits totalling at least 5 million pesos to accounts linked to him between June 2020 and December 2024, allegedly laundering proceeds through betting and casinos.

=== Modus operandi ===
According to the Office of the Attorney General (FGR), the network bought refined fuel abroad and shipped it to Mexican ports, where customs agents and naval officers reclassified the cargo as untaxed petrochemical products before it was offloaded by local companies. Exporters at U.S. ports identified the shipments correctly as fuel; the reclassification occurred on arrival in Mexico, where officials were said to have accepted bribes to alter documentation, change laboratory test results, and permit unloading without inspection.

Shipments were declared under the Mexican tariff heading for lubricant oil additives in bulk rather than the headings for gasoline or diesel. Tankers loaded at terminals in Houston and docked at Altamira and Tampico; the tanker Nord Supreme made four voyages between January and March 2024, declaring 18 million litres as additives. Samples drawn from arriving tankers at Tampico, Altamira, Guaymas, and Ensenada were sent to the National Customs Agency's central laboratory, which certified cargoes of diesel as oil. According to the FGR, customs inspectors substituted bottles of another substance for the samples taken from the ships, and the protected witness testified that a substitute sample had been prepared in advance of one inspection; prosecutors alleged that inspectors received between 40,000 and 50,000 pesos for each vessel cleared. Within the customs offices, staff in the computing and accounting sections validated payments and scanned permits, operations staff staged inspections when a shipment was flagged, and camera operators and supervisors suppressed alerts.

Investigators identified at least 69 illicit maritime shipments between June 2023 and March 2025, importing more than 564 million litres of contraband fuel and generating an estimated US$150 million in profit for the network. Officials estimated that each tanker unloaded without payment of the IEPS cost the treasury about 1 billion pesos (about US$51 million). Prosecutors alleged that the Farías Laguna brothers' ring charged bribes of up to US$90,000 per shipment to allow tankers through the port of Tampico. A central node of the operation was the Tampico Terminal Marítima and its concession over fiscal dock 289 (Muelle Fiscal 289), through which, the protected witness testified, contraband fuel was repeatedly unloaded without proper inspection.

To launder its proceeds and disguise the fuel's origin, the network relied on a ring of around 40 companies, dubbed in the press "Los Petrofactureros" (lit. 'petro-invoicers'), that issued fraudulent invoices simulating legitimate commercial transactions. The companies lacked the permits, personnel, or infrastructure to handle hydrocarbons and functioned only as vehicles for tax evasion and money laundering; authorities estimated that they simulated operations worth about 23 billion pesos (about US$1.1 billion).

== Arrests and prosecutions ==
In May 2025, Captain Alejandro Torres Joaquín, a former Tampico port official, surrendered to the FGR and became a protected witness under the codename "Santo". He had joined the port's operations in 2021 and was later promoted to port director under the Farías Laguna brothers, giving him direct knowledge of the unloading scheme. He turned over 19.5 million pesos that prosecutors described as illicit proceeds, and his testimony became central to the case.

On 8 September 2025, federal authorities announced the arrest of fourteen people, among them six naval personnel, customs employees, and business executives; those detained included Manuel Roberto Farías Laguna and Francisco Javier Antonio Martínez, a former customs director assigned to the Tampico port administration. Attorney General Alejandro Gertz Manero said further arrests, potentially including government officials, were expected, and authorities said they had requested more than 200 arrest warrants. Two officers connected to the case died in the days that followed. In October 2025, a judge suspended an order for the arrest of Solano Ruiz, who remained a fugitive.

In early April 2026, arrest warrants were issued against people tied to the more than 40 companies that the "petrofactureros" network had used to move contraband fuel through several states, including Jalisco and Tamaulipas. The first raids were carried out in the State of Mexico, Chihuahua, Querétaro, and Mexico City, where federal forces detained several suspects, among them the alleged leader, Héctor Iván Pineda. In early May 2026, a judge ordered Pineda and eight other members to stand trial on charges of organized crime and money laundering. At the end of May 2026, authorities arrested businessman Jesús Ricardo Puente in Nuevo León in connection with the network.

Fernando Farías Laguna, meanwhile, had fled Mexico. He entered Argentina on 1 April 2026 under the false identity "Luis Lemus Ramos" and was arrested on 23 April 2026 in Palermo, Buenos Aires, where Argentine authorities classified him as a high-risk detainee. An Argentine federal court opened extradition proceedings, which he contested while announcing that he would seek political asylum; he was transferred to a federal prison in May 2026 and, if convicted in Mexico, faced up to 40 years in prison. On 19 August 2026, Argentine authorities authorized his expulsion to Mexico after the Mexican government withdrew its extradition request, allowing the case to proceed as a deportation. He was flown to Mexico aboard a naval aircraft on 20 August 2026 and taken to the Altiplano maximum-security prison, where his brother was already held. Setting out its case that month, the FGR said sixteen people had been detained, twelve of them former public servants, and that the network had operated in Tamaulipas, Baja California, Colima, Sonora, and Mexico City.

== Deaths ==
Two officers connected to the case died in September 2025, following the killing of Guerrero Alcántar the previous November. On 8 September 2025, the Navy reported that Captain Abraham Jeremías Pérez Ramírez, who was accused of accepting bribes to allow uninspected unloading, had died in his office at the port protection unit in Altamira, in a death officially described as a suicide, one day after the charges against him became public. Captain Adrián Omar del Ángel Zúñiga died the following day, 9 September 2025. In January 2026, the FGR opened an investigation into whether Solano Ruiz had been involved in the two captains' deaths, reporting that he had allegedly threatened both men before they died.

== Reactions and aftermath ==
The scandal posed an early test for President Claudia Sheinbaum, who had taken office in October 2024. Her administration's anti-corruption ministry opened internal investigations at the ports of Tampico, Guaymas, and Ensenada, as well as within the Navy and the customs agency. In October 2025, Sheinbaum ordered the creation of a special inter-agency task force against huachicol fiscal, drawing on the Secretariat of Defense (SEDENA), the Secretariat of the Navy (SEMAR), the Secretariat of Security and Citizen Protection, the National Customs Agency (ANAM), and Pemex. In April 2026, Sheinbaum replaced the head of the National Customs Agency (ANAM), Rafael Marín Mollinedo, with Héctor Alonso Romero Gutiérrez, though she said the change was unrelated to the fuel-smuggling investigation. Some analysts argued that the case, despite implicating the armed forces, gave Sheinbaum an opportunity to distance her government from corruption tied to the previous administration.

== See also ==
- Mexican drug war
- Corruption in Mexico
