= José Meléndez =

José Meléndez may refer to:

- José Meléndez (pitcher, born 1908) (1908–1985), Nicaraguan baseball player
- José Meléndez (pitcher, born 1965), Puerto Rican baseball player
- José Meléndez (sprinter) (born 1993), Venezuelan athlete
- Bill Melendez (born José Meléndez, 1916–2008), American animator
- José Meléndez-Pérez, American customs official

== See also ==
- Meléndez
- Melendez
- José Menéndez
