= Sebastião Mendes =

Sebastião Mendes may refer to:

- Sebastião Mendes (athlete) (1930–2007), Brazilian steeplechaser
- Sebastião Mendes (footballer) (born 1945), Brazilian footballer
