= Mendez (disambiguation) =

Mendez may refer to:

- Mendez (surname)
- Mendez (horse)
- Méndez Municipality, Tamaulipas, Mexico
- Mendez, Cavite, Philippines
- Mendez XXVI one of the main characters from the film Beneath the Planet of the Apes
- Benveniste/Mendes family were prominent in 11th to 15th century France, Portugal and Spain.

== See also ==
- Mendes (disambiguation)
