= Menendo =

Menendo may refer to:

- Menendo I (d. 1189), Bishop of Oviedo
- Menendo González (d. 1008), Duke of Galicia and Count of Portugal
- Menendo Núñez (fl. 1028–1050), Count of Portugal

== See also ==
- Mendo (disambiguation)
