= Menéndez =

Menéndez or Menendez is a Spanish name of Germanic origin. In English, the name is often spelled without the diacritic. A shorter form sharing the same root is Mendez.

Menéndez or Menendez may refer to:

== People named Menéndez or Menendez ==
- Andrés Ignacio Menéndez (1879–1962), President of El Salvador twice, in 1934–1935 and 1944
- Emilio Menéndez (born 1945), Spanish politician and member of the European Parliament
- Francisco Menéndez (1830–1890), President of El Salvador 1885–1890
- Francisco Menendez (creole) (18th century), former slave who led a militia against the British in 1740
- Frank Tremar Sibly Menendez (1896–1973), British-Bahaman soldier
- Jorge Fernández Menéndez (contemporary), Mexican editor and columnist
- José Menéndez Menéndez (1846–1918), Spanish businessman based in Argentina and Chilean Patagonia.
- Katherine M. Menendez, American judge
- Luciano Benjamín Menéndez (1927–2018), Argentine general, Provisional Federal Interventor of Córdoba, Argentina 1975
- Mario Benjamín Menéndez (1930–2015), Argentine general, military Governor of the Falklands during the Falklands War
- Lyle and Erik Menendez, American brothers who were convicted of murdering their parents in 1989
- Manuel Menéndez (1793–1847), President of Peru for three brief periods 1841–1845
- Marcelino Menéndez y Pelayo (1856–1912), Spanish scholar, historian, and literary critic
- Matilde Menéndez (born 1944), Argentine psychiatrist and public official
- Osleidys Menéndez (born 1979), Cuban Olympic championship javelin thrower
- Pedro Menéndez de Avilés (1519–1574), first governor of Spanish Florida & governor of colonial Cuba
- Pidal Juan Menéndez (1861–1915), Spanish archivist, jurisconsult, historian, and poet
- Pidal Luis Menéndez (1860–1932), Spanish genre painter
- Pidal María Goyri de Menéndez (1873–1955), Spanish Hispanicist, professor, and author
- Ramón Menéndez Pidal or Pidal Ramón Menéndez (1869–1968), Spanish philologist and historian
- Robert "Bob" Menendez (born 1954), American politician, Representative and Senator from New Jersey

== Fictional characters ==
- Raul Menendez, the main antagonist of Call of Duty: Black Ops II

== See also ==
- Mendez
- Mendes (name)
- Meléndez
