= Mendes (name) =

Mendes is a common Portuguese and Galician surname. Origin: Germanic patronym (Son of Menendus, later Son of Mem).

== People ==
=== General ===
- António Lopes Mendes (1835–1894), Portuguese explorer and writer
- António Rosa Mendes (1954-2013), Portuguese academic
- Benjamin Mendes da Costa (1803–1868), English merchant and philanthropist
- Emanuel Mendes da Costa (1717–1791), English botanist, naturalist, philosopher
- Fernão Mendes Pinto (c. 1509–1583), Portuguese adventurer, explorer and writer
- Ian Mendes (born 1976), Canadian sports broadcaster
- Isabel Mendes Lopes (born 1982), Portuguese politician
- Ismenia Mendes, Portuguese actress
- Jacob Mendes Da Costa (born 1833–1900), American surgeon
- José Fernando Ferreira Mendes (born 1965), Portuguese physicist
- Luís Mendes de Vasconcellos (died 1623), Portuguese Grand Master of the Knights Hospitaller
- Moses da Costa (full name Moses Mendes da Costa; died 1747), English banker
- Pedro Pedrosa Mendes, Portuguese scientist
- Raimundo Teixeira Mendes (1855–1927), Brazilian philosopher and mathematician
- Gracia Mendes Nasi (1510-1569), prominent Portuguese Jewish philanthropist and businesswoman

=== Arts ===
- Alfred Mendes (1897-1991), Trinidadian novelist
- Bob Mendes (1928–2021), Belgian accountant and writer of detective stories
- Camila Mendes (born 1994), American actress
- Catulle Mendès (1841–1909), French poet
- Eva Mendes (born 1974), American actress, model, singer and homeware and clothing designer
- Joe Alfie Winslet Mendes (born 2003), American-British actor, known professionally as Joe Anders
- Louis Mendes (born 1940), American photographer
- Manuel Mendes (c. 1547–1605), Portuguese composer
- Matthieu Mendès (born 1982), French singer, songwriter, music producer and musician guitarist
- Murilo Mendes (1901–1975), Brazilian poet
- Paulo Mendes da Rocha (1928–2021), Brazilian architect
- Sam Mendes (born 1965), British stage and film director
- Sara Mendes da Costa (born c. 1966), British voice actress
- Sérgio Mendes (1941–2024), Brazilian musician
- Shawn Mendes (born 1998), Canadian musician
- Simon Mendes da Costa, British playwright

=== Politics and military ===
- Aristides de Sousa Mendes (1885–1954), Portuguese diplomat and Righteous Among The Nations
- Chico Mendes (1944–1988), Brazilian environmental activist
- Duarte Mendes (born 1947), Portuguese captain and singer
- Elvira Mendes (c. 996–1022), Queen of Léon
- Francisco Mendes (1939–1978), Guinea-Bissau politician
- Idalino Manuel Mendes, Angolan politician
- José Mendes Cabeçadas (1883–1965), Portuguese military and politician
- Luís Filipe Castro Mendes (born 1950), Portuguese politician
- Luís Marques Mendes (born 1957), Portuguese politician
- Pierre Mendès-France (1907–1982), French politician

=== Religion ===
- Abraham Pereira Mendes (1825–1893), English rabbi and educator
- Henry Pereira Mendes (1852–1937), American rabbi
- Isaac P. Mendes (1853–1904), Jamaican-American rabbi
- João Mendes de Silva (1420–1482) known as Amadeus of Portugal, Portuguese beatified Franciscan friar
- Luciano Mendes de Almeida (1930–2006), Brazilian Jesuit priest and bishop
- Wanigamuni Miguel Mendes Wimalarathna (1823–1890), Sri Lankan Sinhala Buddhist orator
- Frederick de Sola Mendes (1850–1927), American rabbi and writer

=== Sports ===
- Carlos Mendes (soccer) (born 1980), United States footballer
- Chad Mendes (born 1985), United States mixed martial artist
- Cleiton Mendes Dos Santos (born 1978), Brazilian footballer
- Daniel Mendes (born 1981), Brazilian footballer
- David Mendes da Silva (born 1982), Dutch footballer
- Elson Mendes (born 2006), Cape Verdean footballer
- Elvis Mendes (born 1997), Cape Verdean footballer
- Isidoro Mendes (born 1951), Brazilian footballer
- Joaquim Mendes da Costa (1911–?) Brazilian footballer
- Joel Mendes (1946–2024), Brazilian footballer
- Jorge Mendes (born 1966), Portuguese football agent
- Junior Mendes (born 1976), English footballer
- Nicole Mendes (born 1997), American softball player
- Pedro Mendes (born 1979), Portuguese footballer
- Rodrigo Mendes (born 1975), Brazilian footballer
- Rosa Mendes (born 1979), ring name of Canadian professional wrestler Milena Roucka
- Sandro Mendes (born 1977), Portuguese footballer
- Scott Mendes (born 1969), American bull rider
- Sebastião Mendes (born 1945), Brazilian footballer
- Sílvio Mendes da Paixão Júnior (born 1976), Brazilian footballer
- Tiago Mendes (born 1981), Portuguese footballer
- Tony Mendes (born 1977), American bull rider

== See also ==
- Benveniste/Mendes family were prominent in 11th to 15th century France, Portugal and Spain.
- Mendis, Sinhala surname which derives from "Mendes"
