= Mentes =

Mentes can refer to:

- two characters in Greek mythology:
  - Mentes (King of the Cicones), as described in the Iliad
  - Mentes (King of the Taphians), as described in the Odyssey
- Menteş, Sandıklı, village in Turkey

Mentes is a surname. Notable people with the surname include:

- Mentes József (1925-96), Hungarian actor
- Murat Menteş (d. 1974), Turkish writer
- Yalçın Menteş (b. 1960), Turkish actor

== See also ==
- Mendes (disambiguation)
- Mentos, mints
- "Mientes," Spanish language song by Mexican group Camila
- Menteşe (disambiguation)
