= Jorge Fernández Menéndez =

Mexican journalist

Jorge Fernández Menéndez (Note: In this Hispanic American name, the first or paternal surname is Fernández and the second or maternal family name is Menéndez.) (born 1955) is Mexican writer, journalist and political commentator. He was born in Buenos Aires, Argentina.

== Works ==
Jorge Fernández Menéndez, a specialist in subversive movements, has written a number of books, including:

- Asesinato de un cardenal: ganancia de pescadores
- El otro poder: Las redes del narcotráfico, la política y violencia en México
- De los maras a los zetas: Los secretos del narcotráfico de Colombia a Chicago
- Nadie supo nada: La verdadera historia del asesinato de Eugenio Garza Sada
- Calderón presidente: La lucha por el poder
- Ni venganza ni perdón (with Julio Scherer Ibarra)

=== Radio work ===
Jorge Fernández Menéndez has an important program on Imagen Radio, 90.5 MHz FM in Mexico City, and also a TV program called Nada Personal on Proyecto 40.

== Awards and recognition ==
In 2000, Menéndez was awarded Mexico's National Journalism Prize for an editorial he published in Milenio.
