= Mendo =

Mendo is a Spanish and Portuguese given name and surname. The surnames Méndez and Mendes are derived from Mendo. An alternative Portuguese form of Mendo is Mem.

"Mendo" may refer to:

== People ==
- Carlos Mendo (1933–2010), Spanish journalist
- Miguel Ángel Mendo (born 1949), Spanish writer
- Paulo Mendo (1932–2025), Portuguese politician
- Mendo Nunes (11th century), Portuguese nobleman
- Mendo Ristovski (born 1956), Australian association football player

== Other uses ==
- Alternate name for Jumbee, Caribbean folk spirit
- Mendó, 2021 album by Alex Cuba
- A nickname of the food chain Mendocino Farms
