= Huachicol =

Adulterated alcoholic beverage and/or stolen fuel

Huachicol (sometimes spelled guachicol) is a Mexican Spanish-language slang term used to refer to adulterated alcoholic beverages or to gasoline or diesel that has been adulterated or stolen.

People who engage in the illegal activity of stealing and adulterating fuel and alcoholic beverages in Mexico are known as huachicoleros. In the 2020s, the term huachicol fiscal has been used to describe the illegal fuel trade in which gasoline and diesel are smuggled into the country through land and maritime borders, evade taxes, and are then sold unlawfully.

== Etymology ==
According to the studies of Arturo Ortega Morán, a Mexican writer specialized in the origin of the words and expressions of Spanish, the word huachicol comes from the Latin word aquati, which means watered down. During the sixteenth century the term aquati referred to a technique used in painting, which consists in diluting the pigments in water. When this word was used in France it became "gouache", retaining its meaning. Later, when the name of this technique arrived in Mexico during the 19th century, people used to refer to it as painting "a la guach".

At that time the tequila and brandy vendors who diluted the drinks with water to obtain more profits, they began to be named with the appellation of guachicolero or huachicolero. Similarly, they began to be called fuel traders who lowered their gasoline or oil with water to achieve better profits. Currently the word huachicolero is used to denote a person dedicated to theft, illegal transfer and sale of hydrocarbons.

It could also derive from the tlachiqueros, people in charge of scraping the maguey and then extracting the mead.

== Preparation and use of the drink ==
For its preparation, huachicoleros filtered the "mojadito" (the cubic sugar or caramel that stuck in the pipes during the distillation of tequila or brandy) through a sieve, added cane alcohol, lit it and distilled it again in a container, adding either cinnamon tea, orange peels, plums, or simple water, to make a watered-down alcoholic drink.

In making huachicol, methanol or wood alcohol is produced because the diversity of the added ingredients and its artisanal process do not guarantee a stable temperature for its proper distillation. Consuming these adulterated drinks causes headaches, tremors, blindness due to optic nerve damage, and possibly death.

== Fuel theft ==
Huachicol is a Mexican term used to describe the theft and illegal resale of fuel products, primarily gasoline and diesel. In its classic form, huachicol involves practices such as illegally tapping fuel pipelines, stealing fuel from tanker trucks, or siphoning hydrocarbons during transport, followed by their resale outside the formal market. The stolen fuel is commonly sold through small, informal roadside outlets, but in more organized schemes it can also be distributed through broader supply networks that channel huachicol into regular gas stations, either with the stations’ knowledge or without their awareness. In some cases gas stations were coerced to buy it.

According to estimates by Mexican authorities and industry associations, around 30 percent of the fuel sold in Mexico originates from huachicol. Further estimates suggest that for every legal gas station, there are approximately 1.6 illegal fuel distribution points, underscoring the depth of market penetration achieved by fuel theft networks.

Newer forms include so called huachicol fiscal, a form of tax and customs fraud with imported fuels.

The adulterated fuel is sometimes diluted with different substances to achieve greater financial benefit when sold and can cause damage to the cars in which it is used.
