= Mendis =

Mendis is a common Sinhalese surname derived from the Português surname Mendes which was introduced to Sri Lanka during Portuguese rule in Sri Lanka. It may refer to

- Ajantha Mendis, Sri Lankan cricketer
- B. J. P. Mendis, Surveyor General in Sri Lanka
- Buddhika Mendis, Sri Lankan cricketer
- Chaminda Mendis, Sri Lankan cricketer
- Cletus Mendis, Sri Lankan actor
- Damien Mendis, British Sri Lankan music producer composer
- Duleep Mendis, Sri Lankan cricketer
- Gehan Mendis, Sri Lankan cricketer
- Ishan Mendis, Sri Lankan actor
- Jeevan Mendis, Sri Lankan cricketer
- Kanchana Mendis, Sri Lankan actress
- Kusal Mendis, Sri Lankan cricketer
- Nandana Mendis, Sri Lankan politician
- Nimal Mendis, Sri Lankan singer
- Paddy Mendis, Sri Lankan air force officer
- Patrick Mendis, Sri Lanka-born American diplomat and Nato and Pacific Command military professor
- Randolph Jewell Francis Mendis, Sri Lankan army officer
- Ramesh Mendis, Sri Lankan cricketer
- Solias Mendis, Sri Lankan temple artist
- Sriyantha Mendis, Sri Lankan actor
- Susirith Mendis, Sri Lankan academic
- Viraj Mendis, Sri Lankan activist
- Vernon Mendis, Sri Lankan diplomat
- Yashoda Mendis, Sri Lankan cricketer
- Valence Mendis, 4th Bishop of Chilaw
- Wijayapala Medis, Sri Lankan Politician
