= Isidoro Mendes =

Brazilian footballer

Personal information
- Full name: Isidoro Mendes
- Date of birth: 1 October 1951 (age 75)
- Place of birth: São Paulo, Brazil
- Position: Left back

Youth career
- Portuguesa

Senior career*
Years	Team	Apps	(Gls)
1970–1978	Portuguesa	294	(5)
1979	Criciúma		
1979–1980	Inter de Limeira		
1981	Criciúma		
- * Club domestic league appearances and goals as of 1 February 2024

Isidoro Mendes (born 1 October 1951), is a Brazilian former professional footballer who played as a left back.

== Career ==
Revealed in the Portuguesa youth categories, he was the team's left back in the 70s, participating in the 1973 São Paulo title and making 298 appearances for the club.

== Personal life ==
Isidoro is the brother of the also footballer, Sebastião Mendes, with whom he played together for Portuguesa on several occasions. He became the owner of a bakery in the municipality of Santo André.

== Honours ==
Portuguesa

- Campeonato Paulista: 1973
- Taça Estado de São Paulo: 1973
- Copa Governador do Estado de São Paulo: 1976
