= Louis Mendes =

American photographer

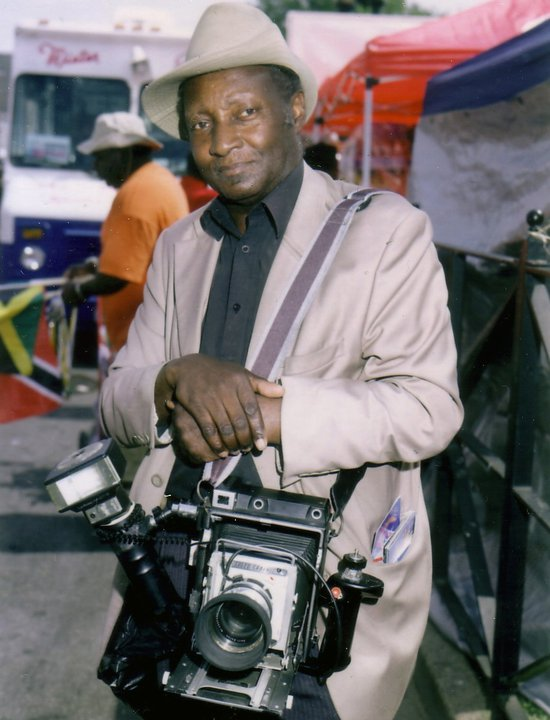
- Mendes in 2009
- Born: June 15, 1940 (age 86); Jamaica, Queens, New York, U.S.
- Education: RCA Institute of Technology
- Known for: Street portraits made with a Graflex Speed Graphic press camera
- Awards: Gordon Parks Foundation Legacy Acquisition Fund (2026)

Louis Mendes (born June 15, 1940) is an American photographer based in New York City who is known for his signature dapper style, press camera, and street portraits. In 2026 he was named a recipient of the Gordon Parks Foundation Legacy Acquisition Fund.

== Early life ==
Mendes was born in 1940 and raised in Jamaica, Queens, the only son in a family of ten children. He has described his father as having instilled in him the habit of always dressing well before leaving the house, a discipline he carried into his later work as a public figure on the streets of New York.

At the age of fourteen, Mendes was handed a camera by an older sister who had previously documented family birthdays and gatherings, and who wanted to appear in the photographs herself. He has said he still owns that first camera. He attended high school in Queens, where he studied radio electronics, and later continued his electronics studies at the RCA Institute of Technology while working as a stock clerk at Macy's Herald Square. He bought his first Graflex Speed Graphic camera in 1959 after a photographer who had seen him taking pictures at Macy's invited him to assist at a nightclub job and told him he would need his own equipment.

== Career ==
Through the 1960s, Mendes worked as a nightlife photographer, making and selling instant prints at parties, clubs, boat rides, and community events across New York. In 1964 he visited the Harlem studio of James Van Der Zee on 125th Street and Lenox Avenue, an encounter he has said he regretted not documenting at the time. From 1968 he held a maintenance job with the Port Authority of New York and New Jersey, which he left in the early 1970s to work as a photographer full-time.

In the 1970s Mendes traveled throughout New York and neighboring states making home portraits of families, including a stint doing door-to-door newborn photography for a studio that received lists of new births from area hospitals. He began experimenting with double exposures using a twin-lens reflex camera with interchangeable lenses, layering subjects into single frames in a manner that became central to his later work. In 1975 he left the studio that employed him and went into business on his own, eventually forming a small portrait company called Family Photographers with several collaborators. He moved from Queens to Harlem in 1982, and for roughly a decade afterward worked weddings outside the marriage bureau at the Brooklyn Borough Hall area, often arranging limousine service as part of his package.

Mendes was profiled in The New York Times in April 1995 by David Gonzalez, an article that significantly raised his public visibility. Later that year he photographed the Million Man March in Washington, D.C., and in October 1997 the Million Woman March in Philadelphia, where he and an assistant exposed roughly 700 sheets of film over the course of the day. Beginning around 2000 he worked aboard the Staten Island Ferry for several years, using a Polaroid Spectra to make double-exposed portraits placing riders against the Statue of Liberty and the Lower Manhattan skyline.

Mendes was profiled a second time by Gonzalez in The New York Times in January 2010, followed by a feature by Kerri MacDonald in the paper's Lens blog, and in 2016 by Lucy McKeon in The New Yorker. He has subsequently become a frequent fixture outside the B&H Photo Video store on Ninth Avenue in Midtown Manhattan, where photographers, tourists, and visiting professionals routinely seek him out for portraits.

== Style and method ==
Mendes typically works with a Speed Graphic press camera fitted with modified film backs that accept various film types, including instant Polaroid film. He has described his process as composing the portrait mentally before approaching the subject, then making a single exposure—frequently a double exposure—so that the final image is reveled only when the print develops in front of the sitter. He sells the resulting prints directly to his subjects.

His subjects over the years have included Duke Ellington, Count Basie, Cab Calloway, Lena Horne, Gordon Parks, Denzel Washington, Spike Lee, Swizz Beatz, Alicia Keys, and Colin Kaepernick. Mendes attended a 1980s lecture by Gordon Parks at Hunter College, where he made a double-exposure portrait of Parks on stage; the two later met again at the Leica Gallery.

== Recognition ==
In 2026 Mendes was named, alongside the Chicago-based photographer Darryl Cowherd, as a recipient of the Gordon Parks Foundation Legacy Acquisition Fund, through which the Foundation acquires significant works for its permanent collection. The award was announced as part of the Foundation's twentieth-anniversary programme and recognized photographers whose work, in the Foundation's framing, contextualizes Parks's own artistic networks and influence.

The 2020 short documentary Nine Days a Week, directed by Tara El Eter, focuses on Mendes's life and practice.

== Publications ==
=== Publications by Mendes ===
- Monumental. Raymond Ortiz, 2010.
- One of a Kind. Raymond Ortiz, 2010.
- The Magic Within. Raymond Ortiz, 2010.
- Mestrado Fotografo. Raymond Ortiz, 2010.

=== Publications with mentions of Mendes ===
- One Hundred Jobs: A Panorama of Work in the American City. The New Press, 2000. By Ron Howell, with photographs by Ozier Muhammad.
- Coney Island. W. W. Norton & Company, 1998. By Harvey Stein.
