= Carlos Meléndez =

Carlos Meléndez may refer to:

- Carlos Meléndez (politician) (1861–1919), president of El Salvador
- Carlos Meléndez Chaverri (1926–2000), Costa Rican historian
- Carlos Antonio Meléndez (born 1958), Salvadoran football goalkeeper and manager
- Carlos Meléndez (singer) (born 1965), Puerto Rican former member of Menudo
- Carlos Meléndez (footballer, born 1957), Spanish football goalkeeper
- Carlos Meléndez (footballer, born 1997), Honduran football defender
- Carlos Meléndez (athlete), see 2002 European Athletics Indoor Championships
