= Emilio Méndez Pérez =

Spanish physicist (born 1949)

Emilio Méndez
- Born: Emilio Méndez Pérez; 22 May 1949 (age 77); Lérida, Spain
- Education: Complutense University of Madrid; Massachusetts Institute of Technology
- Scientific career
- Fields: Semiconductor nanomaterials; Quantum wells; Stark effect; Wannier–Stark ladder

Emilio Méndez Pérez (born 22 May 1949) is a Spanish physicist. His research has focused on the study of the optical and electronic properties of semiconductor nanomaterials. Particularly notable are his discoveries on the effects of an electric field on the electronic properties of quantum wells and superlattices, especially the experimental demonstration of the so-called "Stark effect" and the so-called "Wannier–Stark ladder".

In 1998, he was awarded the Prince of Asturias Awards for Technical and Scientific Research along Pedro Miguel Echenique Landiríbar.
