= Meléndez =

Meléndez is a surname in the Spanish language. The American variant is Melendez. Notable people with the surname include:

- Adolfo Meléndez (1884–1968), Spanish military scientist
- Agliberto Meléndez (1942–2025), Dominican film director
- Carlos Meléndez (disambiguation), multiple people
- Flor Meléndez, Puerto Rican coach
- Gerardo Meléndez, Puerto Rico-born scientist
- Jack Meléndez, Puerto Rican sportscaster
- Juan Meléndez Valdés (1754–1817), Spanish poet
- Jorge Meléndez (1871–1953), 26th President of El Salvador
- José Meléndez, multiple people
- María Meléndez (born 1951), Puerto Rican politician
- Rodrigo Meléndez (born 1977), Chilean football player
- Tayra Meléndez

== See also ==
- Melendez
