= Attempted assassination of Omar García Harfuch =

2020 cartel attack in Mexico City

- Location: 19.423°N 99.216°W; Paseo de la Reforma at Monte Blanco, Lomas de Chapultepec, Miguel Hidalgo, Mexico City, Mexico
- Date: 26 June 2020 c. 06:38 (CDT)
- Target: Omar García Harfuch
- Attack type: Ambush, attempted assassination
- Weapons: .50 caliber Barrett rifles, FN SCAR and other assault rifles, grenade launcher, fragmentation grenades, pistols
- Deaths: 3 (two police escorts and one bystander)
- Injuries: 5, including García Harfuch (Note: Totals for the wounded differ. Prosecutors cited five wounded victims, including García Harfuch, in the March 2024 convictions; Mexico News Daily reported four police officers and a 23-year-old woman wounded in addition to García Harfuch; and a December 2024 report referred to four victims of attempted homicide.)
- Perpetrator: Jalisco New Generation Cartel
- Assailant: c. 28 (according to prosecutors)
- Accused: 25 arrested (19 in 2020, 6 in 2021)
- Convicted: 14 (as of December 2024)

On 26 June 2020, Omar García Harfuch, then the Secretary of Citizen Security of Mexico City, survived an assassination attempt when gunmen ambushed his armored vehicle on Paseo de la Reforma in the Lomas de Chapultepec neighborhood of Mexico City. He was hit by three bullets; two of his police escorts and Gabriela Gómez Cervantes, a 26-year-old food vendor driving to work, were killed. From the hospital, García Harfuch blamed the Jalisco New Generation Cartel (CJNG), as did prosecutors.

García Harfuch had led the capital's police since October 2019. The CJNG had a limited presence in the city, where it worked through an alliance with a local gang. In early June 2020, federal intelligence intercepted a call in which CJNG members discussed attacking García Harfuch and three federal officials. He later acknowledged that his protection that day was inadequate. According to prosecutors, about 28 attackers had been hired three weeks earlier, with local criminal groups supplying surveillance, safe houses and vehicles.

At about 6:38 a.m., a truck and a white Suburban blocked García Harfuch's car at the junction of Reforma and Monte Blanco. Gunmen fired on it with assault rifles and .50 caliber Barrett rifles, and rounds pierced its armor, killing the two officers in the front seats. Police arrested twelve suspects near the scene, and later detained José Armando Briseño de los Santos, "El Vaca", whom authorities named as the organizer; nineteen were in custody by July. In March 2024, twelve of the gunmen were convicted of aggravated homicide and attempted aggravated homicide and sentenced to 316 years and eight months each, capped by law at 70 years; two more were convicted that December. The CJNG commanders accused of ordering the attack, Julio César Montero Pinzón, "El Tarjetas", and Carlos Andrés Rivera Varela, "La Firma", remained at large in 2026.

President Andrés Manuel López Obrador said the government would not be intimidated but would not "declare war on anyone", while opposition leaders used the attack to criticize his "hugs, not bullets" security policy. Commentators criticized the failure to act on the intercepted threats, and analysts described the ambush as an unprecedented challenge to the Mexico City police and a sign of the CJNG's ambitions in the capital. García Harfuch returned to work a month after the attack.

== Background ==
=== García Harfuch and the Mexico City police ===
García Harfuch, a former Federal Police commander, had headed the federal Criminal Investigation Agency until June 2019 and then the investigative police of the Mexico City attorney general's office. On 4 October 2019, Head of Government of Mexico City Claudia Sheinbaum appointed him Secretary of Citizen Security after his predecessor, Jesús Orta, resigned. According to crime researcher Víctor Sánchez, intelligence-led operations after García Harfuch took office led to the arrest of several members of La Unión Tepito and the Tláhuac Cartel.

=== The CJNG in Mexico City ===
By mid-2020, the Jalisco New Generation Cartel had not built a strong presence in the capital; journalist Óscar Balderas, quoted by InSight Crime, said the group operated mainly in the city's poorer neighborhoods. According to Sánchez, the CJNG had financed "La Anti-Unión", a breakaway rival of La Unión Tepito led by Jorge Flores Concha, "El Tortas". A 2021 report by the Justice in Mexico program at the University of San Diego described the CJNG's Mexico City operations as resting on an alliance with this Fuerza Anti-Unión Tepito, and found violence linked to the cartel in the capital "relatively low" because it faced no major cartel rival there.

The attack came during a period of violence against public officials. On 16 June 2020, federal judge Uriel Villegas Ortiz and his wife had been killed in Colima, a killing also attributed to the CJNG, and InSight Crime also noted the kidnapping and murder of a lawmaker earlier that month.

=== Prior threats ===
Between 8 and 12 June 2020, Mexico's National Intelligence Center intercepted a telephone call in which CJNG members discussed sending gunmen against officials who were disrupting the cartel's operations. Those named included Foreign Minister Marcelo Ebrard, over the extradition of El Mencho's son; Security Minister Alfonso Durazo; Financial Intelligence Unit head Santiago Nieto, over frozen cartel bank accounts; and García Harfuch. Milenio reported the call on 17 June, and Durazo confirmed it. On the day of the attack, Durazo said that "a possible threat against some public security officials" had been registered a week earlier, but ruled out a leak of García Harfuch's route. In an interview three months after the attack, García Harfuch said he had been warned of possible attacks six to eight weeks beforehand, and acknowledged that on the day he did not have the security detail he should have had. He also said he had known since August 2019 that a criminal organization intended to attack him.

== Attack ==
=== Lead-up ===
At a press conference on the day of the attack, a spokesman for Attorney General of Mexico City Ernestina Godoy said the attackers had been hired about three weeks earlier and organized into four cells of seven, and had been told to watch for city police patrols. At 10 p.m. on 25 June they were taken to collect their weapons and then to three interception points: Reforma and Monte Blanco, Hamburgo and Florencia, and Monte Blanco and Explanada.

A fuller account comes from the statement given by José Armando Briseño de los Santos, "El Vaca", whom authorities accused of organizing the attack, to the National Intelligence Center, as reported by columnist Carlos Loret de Mola. In it, he said that about 50 men were trained at a ranch belonging to CJNG commander Julio César Montero Pinzón, "El Tarjetas", without being told the target; that roughly 40 of them traveled to Mexico City by bus and van about two weeks before the attack and were only then given García Harfuch's name; and that Unión Tepito members lodged them in houses in Gustavo A. Madero and Tláhuac. He said the participants had been promised 2 million pesos but were paid 9,000, and that the order came from Carlos Andrés Rivera Varela, "La Firma", whom he placed third in the cartel's hierarchy after El Mencho and "El 03".

=== Ambush ===
At about 4:00 a.m. on 26 June, according to prosecutors, the cells were moved in a white Suburban and a black vehicle to their positions. Shortly after 6:30 a.m., García Harfuch was traveling along Paseo de la Reforma toward the city center for a morning meeting with Head of Government of Mexico City Claudia Sheinbaum, in an armored Chevrolet Suburban.

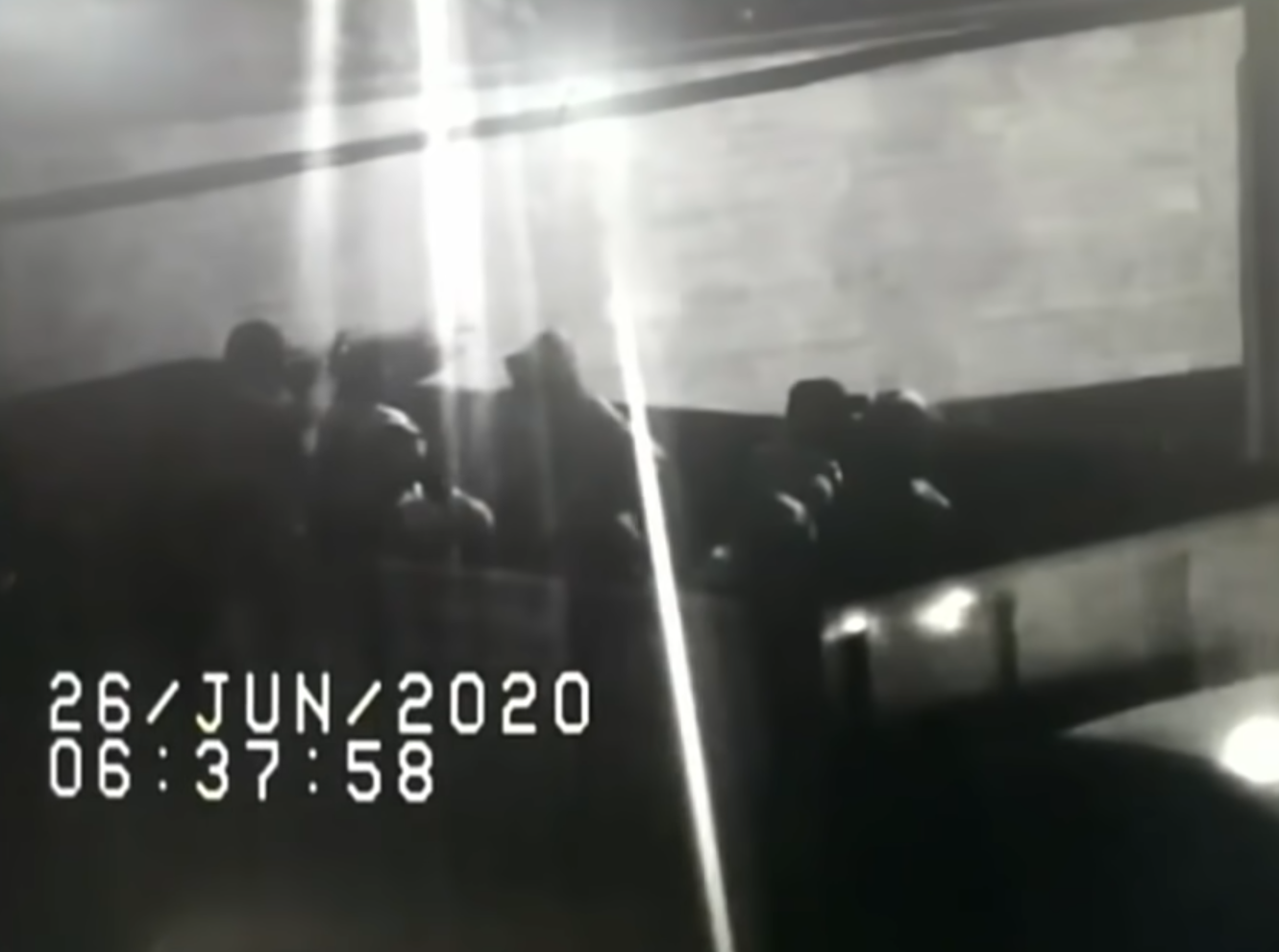
Security-camera footage of gunmen firing from the bed of a truck on Paseo de la Reforma

At the junction with Monte Blanco, a 3.5-ton truck and a white Suburban blocked the road. The truck carried the logo of Grupo Carso's construction subsidiary CICSA, which denied owning it; some of the attackers were dressed as road workers. Security-camera footage showed about eight gunmen firing from the truck's cargo bed, which had been fitted with improvised armor, while a second group fired from the Suburban. The attackers used FN SCAR assault rifles and .50 caliber Barrett rifles, which can pierce vehicle armor and are difficult to obtain in Mexico. Estimates of the number of rounds fired range from more than 100 to more than 400. (Note: Expansión cited media reports of more than 100 spent cases on the day of the attack; Mexico News Daily reported "more than 150 high-caliber rounds" the following day; Reuters reported in 2026 that more than 400 rounds were fired.)

With trees on one side of the boulevard and a parked bus on the other, the Suburban could not escape, and its driver was unable to reverse. In his first interviews, in September 2020, García Harfuch said the truck cut them off at a speed bump and the Suburban was disabled within seconds. He said he fired at the attackers through the windshield, then moved to the back of the vehicle for another weapon and was hit in the elbow and then the knee; the wound to his leg kept him from kicking the door open. He described the shooting as having "felt like hours". Rounds broke through the armor, killing the two officers in the front seats. García Harfuch said that after the attackers withdrew he called for a helicopter on a borrowed radio. After a few minutes the attackers broke off, apparently believing García Harfuch was dead. The attackers' Suburban reversed away, while the occupants of the truck, which could not be moved, fled on foot. The fifty-one Molotov cocktails they had brought, consistent with the plan to set the car alight, went unused. Stray bullets struck houses in the neighborhood.

== Victims ==
García Harfuch was hit in the shoulder, collarbone and knee and was operated on the same day. The two officers killed had guarded him for several years. Rafael O., 41, a 15-year veteran who had served in the Federal Police, was director of the secretary's personal security staff and had headed his protection team at the Criminal Investigation Agency. Edgar González Ortiz, 47, a sub-inspector with twelve years' service, had joined García Harfuch's security team at the city attorney general's office. Gabriela Gómez Cervantes, a 26-year-old from Xalatlaco, State of Mexico, who sold quesadillas near the Auditorio Nacional, was killed by a shot to the head while driving to work with her husband and other relatives. Her sister Tanya, 24, who was traveling with her, was shot in the arm and operated on at the Red Cross hospital in Polanco. Prosecutors counted five people wounded, including García Harfuch.

Mexico City's Executive Commission for Victim Assistance (CEAVI) promised Gómez Cervantes's family full reparations, including legal, psychological and social-work support, funeral costs and food aid; her father said she left two daughters, aged three and nine. The day after the attack her family complained that a city official had handed her sister 10,000 pesos in a private meeting; a relative asked whether "a death and two orphans" were worth that sum and called for scholarships for the children and replacement of the family's car.

Edgar González Ortiz was buried in Puebla on 27 June. In September 2020, his family said it had been promised a ceremony with medals that had not taken place, and his brother asked for compensation. García Harfuch said compensation had been paid, but only to the officers' wives and children.

== Perpetrators ==
=== Attackers ===
According to investigators cited by El Universal, the CJNG worked with three Mexico City groups: members of La Unión Tepito monitored García Harfuch's movements, the Tláhuac Cartel supplied gunmen and houses to hide them, and ACME, a recently formed group engaged in robbery and drug sales in the north of the city, provided vehicles, warehouses and homes. The conspirators began buying vehicles and weapons on 9 June and planned to set García Harfuch's car on fire. In July, the city's attorney general's office said the Anti-Unión had also taken part. By 2022, prosecutors alleged that Briseño de los Santos had received about 200,000 pesos to organize the attack. The men convicted in 2024 came from Mexico City, Guadalajara, Guerrero, Nayarit, Chihuahua and Michoacán, and one was Colombian.

=== Alleged masterminds ===
Accounts differ on who gave the order. Investigators cited by El Universal named Julio César Montero Pinzón, "El Tarjetas", a CJNG leader in Puerto Vallarta close to El Mencho, as having sent Briseño de los Santos to Mexico City. Briseño de los Santos's reported statement, and InSight Crime's summary of the official account, named Carlos Andrés Rivera Varela, "La Firma" or "El Morro". In March 2021, Mexico's Financial Intelligence Unit froze Rivera Varela's accounts, citing the attack. On 6 April 2021, the US Treasury sanctioned Rivera Varela and Francisco Javier Gudiño Haro, describing the Puerto Vallarta enforcement group they led as "allegedly responsible" for the attempted assassination of Mexico City's security secretary. In 2025, US prosecutors charged both men with offenses including money laundering and material support to a foreign terrorist organization, in connection with a fraud scheme targeting American timeshare owners; the FBI offered rewards for them, and in August 2026, the State Department offered up to US$10 million each. The US charges do not concern the attack, but DEA Administrator Terry Cole described Montero Pinzón that month as the man who had tried to kill García Harfuch in 2020. Neither man had been reported captured as of mid-2026.

== Aftermath ==
=== Immediate aftermath ===
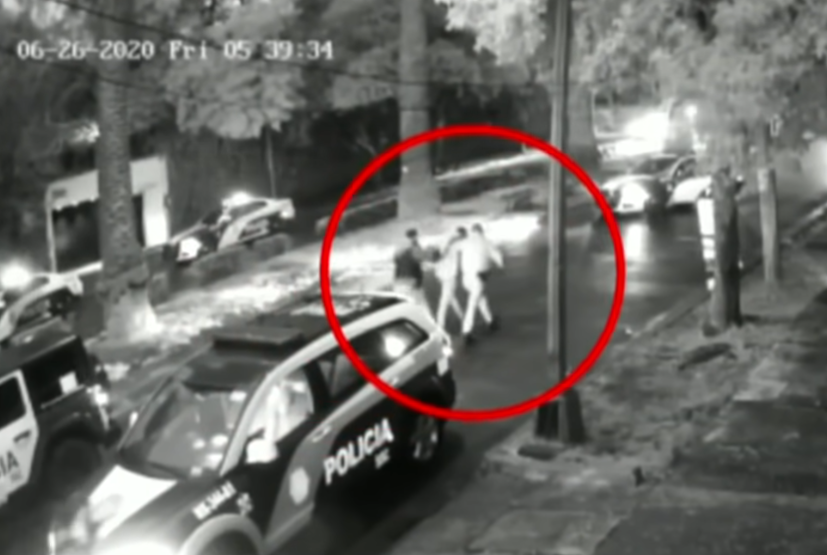
Police detaining a suspected attacker on the day of the attack

City police detained twelve men near Monte Blanco and Explanada within minutes of the attack. From the hospital, García Harfuch posted on Twitter that "this morning we were cowardly attacked by the CJNG", adding that two colleagues and friends had died and that he had three bullet wounds and several fragment injuries. He was discharged on 6 July after about ten days in hospital; Head of Government of Mexico City Claudia Sheinbaum said he would need rehabilitation but had no injuries expected to affect him permanently.

=== Investigation ===
State of Mexico surveillance cameras tracked two more men, aged 19 and 23 and from Puerto Vallarta and Oaxaca, to Atlacomulco, where they were arrested in a Volkswagen Jetta; five more people were arrested in Tláhuac. Among those arrested in Tláhuac was Briseño de los Santos, whom authorities described as a CJNG hitman chief in Tonalá, Jalisco, and the planner of the attack; they also accused him of recruiting the gunmen who killed two Israeli citizens at the Artz Pedregal shopping center in July 2019. He was detained with four others, including two women.

The fourteen men arrested at or near the scene and in Atlacomulco were charged with aggravated homicide and attempted aggravated homicide; according to authorities, they had agreed to tell investigators they were construction workers, artisans and farmers. Briseño de los Santos, who had not been at the scene, was initially bound over only for bribery, and the four people arrested with him for drug, bribery and weapons offenses. By June 2021, he had also been bound over for organized crime, homicide and attempted homicide and was held at the Altiplano federal prison; gunshot-residue tests on him were negative, and his defense denied that he belonged to the CJNG. On 10 July, a judge at the Reclusorio Norte ruled the detentions lawful, and the suspects were transferred to federal prisons in Sonora, Oaxaca, Chiapas and Morelos. Prosecutors also requested information on an officer of the city police whom sources linked to the attack, but the police internal affairs unit reported finding "no indications or evidence" that officers had taken part. Six more people were arrested in 2021. According to the US Congressional Research Service, about 80 bank accounts were frozen in connection with the case.

Investigators recovered five .50 caliber rifles, 34 assault rifles, eight handguns, seven fragmentation grenades, a grenade launcher and the Molotov cocktails, along with bulletproof vests. In March 2025, Chihuahua authorities arrested Roland Alberto Muñoz in Ciudad Juárez, a US citizen accused of trafficking arms for La Línea and the CJNG, and handed him over to US authorities; according to the Diario de Chihuahua, he had sold weapons used in the attack. Mexican authorities did not publicly confirm the link.

=== Trials ===
On 15 March 2024, a trial court convicted twelve men of aggravated homicide and attempted aggravated homicide. Each received the maximum penalty: 50 years for each of the three people killed and 33 years and four months for each of the five wounded, a total of 316 years and eight months, of which the penal code limits time served to 70 years. They were also ordered to pay reparations to the victims and their families, including for psychological harm and damaged vehicles. García Harfuch had testified remotely as a victim in October 2023. On 20 December 2024, the two men arrested at Atlacomulco were sentenced to more than 86 years each, likewise capped at 70, bringing the number convicted to fourteen. Briseño de los Santos's case had been suspended at the intermediate stage in 2022 while a court considered an amparo filed by his defense.

=== Criticism of security arrangements ===
InSight Crime noted that commentators and journalists said the government had been aware of CJNG threats against García Harfuch and other officials. Columnist Héctor de Mauleón wrote in El Universal that intelligence had flagged the plot weeks earlier and that "the impression remains that, once again, [the government] lacked the capacity to prevent it". Vanda Felbab-Brown of the Brookings Institution described Mexico's criminal market as "out of control and brazen", called the failure to protect García Harfuch despite advance intelligence a "tactical disaster", and argued that the 28 recruits, with minimal tactical skills, had been treated as expendable; she linked the attack to criminal groups' sense of impunity after the Battle of Culiacán and criticized the "hugs, not bullets" policy.

An analysis by TorchStone, a security consultancy, argued that the operation was well resourced but failed through the attackers' incompetence, and that García Harfuch's predictable route and the absence of counter-surveillance had left him exposed despite his armored vehicle; it questioned why his protection had not been increased after the intercepted call.

=== García Harfuch ===
García Harfuch resumed some duties in the week of 23 July, meeting operational commanders while still recovering, and formally returned the following week. On his return, he announced a strengthening of the police internal affairs unit. In June 2021, he had minor surgery to remove bullet fragments. According to Reuters, after the attack, he moved into police headquarters, and as federal secretary he lived in a fortified apartment at the ministry. He remained Mexico City's security secretary until 9 September 2023, when he resigned to seek the Morena nomination for head of government. On 4 July 2024, Sheinbaum, by then president-elect, named him federal Secretary of Security and Citizen Protection in her incoming cabinet.

In October 2025, columnist Raymundo Riva Palacio reported that shots had been fired at a building in Polanco that García Harfuch used as an office; García Harfuch denied it, saying "I have not suffered any attacks" and that many alerts were investigated and discarded.

== Reactions ==
=== Domestic ===
President Andrés Manuel López Obrador, speaking at his morning press conference in Morelia on 26 June, said the attack was "undoubtedly" connected with the government's work to guarantee peace. In a video message the next day, he said: "We will not let ourselves be intimidated ... we are not going to declare war on anyone." He said there was "a clearly drawn line" against deals with organized crime, and that officials felt fear "because we are human beings" but were not cowards. Security Minister Alfonso Durazo called it a "cowardly attack on a public servant", said the government would keep fighting organized crime "with intelligence and not with stridency", and said no criminal group had the capacity to challenge the Mexican state. Attorney General of Mexico City Ernestina Godoy announced that her office would investigate jointly with the federal Attorney General's Office.

On the day of the attack, Head of Government of Mexico City Claudia Sheinbaum said she knew of no threats against García Harfuch and would not change her own security arrangements. On 29 June, she said she had known of the threats against him and expressed full confidence in him, noting that 50 police officers had been detained in recent months for offenses ranging from corruption to abuse. She called the attack a failed operation, saying the city police "arrived in minutes and made 12 arrests".

Opposition politicians condemned the attack and several used it to criticize the government's security strategy. PAN president Marko Cortés wrote: "No more 'hugs, not bullets' policy. Crime is more empowered than ever." PRI president Alejandro Moreno called for a new strategy, and former president Felipe Calderón sent a message of solidarity, as did governors from several opposition-led states.

=== International ===
US Ambassador Christopher Landau sent García Harfuch "a very strong embrace" and condolences to the families of the dead, writing that the attack "underlines the need to deepen our cooperation to defeat organized crime".

=== Analysis ===
Security analyst Alejandro Hope called the attack an "exceptional event", noting that no group had previously dared to confront the Mexico City police, and suggested the decision to target García Harfuch might have been a mistake rather than a calculated strategy. InSight Crime placed the attack within the CJNG's pattern of high-visibility violence against the state, such as the 2015 ambush that killed 15 police officers in Jalisco, and read it as a sign that the cartel was trying to expand into the capital.

The Justice in Mexico report listed the attack, with the Villegas killing and the October 2019 ambush of police in Aguililla, among CJNG attacks on officials that had "become more noticeable". A 2022 Congressional Research Service report cited the "daylight ambush" as an example of the CJNG's reputation for extreme and intimidating violence, and noted reports that some judges had declined to accept organized-crime cases, citing the attack.

== See also ==
- Mexican drug war
- List of people who survived assassination attempts
