= Melendez =

Melendez is the American spelling of the Spanish-Asturleonese surname Meléndez (var. Menéndez), common in the United States Puerto Rican community. Melendez is also the surname of Filipinos and Filipino-Americans, given that Philippines was once a Spanish Commonwealth and later a US Commonwealth. The name means "son of Melendo" or "son of Menendo", it is related to the Visigothic name Hermenegild. It may refer to:

- Andre Melendez (1971-1998), nicknamed "Angel", a Club Kid and purported drug dealer murdered by Michael Alig and Robert D. "Freeze" Riggs
- Benjamin Melendez (1952-2017), American gang member
- Bill Melendez (1916-2008), Mexican-born American animator
- Brian Melendez, American politician
- Fausto Melendez, Filipino-American Chicago, IL postal worker who came up with the idea of the US postal ZIP Code.
- Gilbert Melendez (1982-), American MMA fighter
- John Melendez (1965-), American writer and radio personality
- Juan Roberto Melendez-Colon (1951-), American prison rights activist
- Lisette Melendez (1967-), American pop singer
- Mervyl Melendez (1974-), American college baseball coach
- MJ Melendez (1998-), American baseball player
