= Coleta Meléndez Torres =

Coleta Meléndez Torres (or Menendez De La Torre; 1886–1917) was a young woman who entered the Association of the Daughters of Mary Immaculate of the town of Degollado, Mexico. On December 24, 1917, she defended her purity from an attack by guerrillas, and fell on her friend Maria de San José (or Josefa) Parra Flores in a burning building: Both girls burnt to death. They were respectively twenty-five and twenty-one years old. The permission for the start of their cause of beatification, in charge of the diocese of San Juan de los Lagos in Mexico, dated October 12, 1995.
