= Menteşe =

Menteşe may refer to:

- Menteşe, Muğla, a district and municipality of Muğla Province, Turkey
- Menteşe (beylik), a principality in southwest Turkey in the 14th century
- Menteşe, a sanjak of the Ottoman Empire, known as Muğla Province since the early 20th century
- Menteşe, Honaz, neighbourhood in the municipality of Honaz, Denizli Province
- Menteşe, Kavaklıdere, a neighbourhood in the municipality of Kavaklıdere, Muğla Province
- Menteşeler, Köşk, a town in Aydın Province
- Nahit Menteşe (1932–2024), Turkish politician
