= Huachicol fiscal =

Mexican fuel fraud scheme

Huachicol fiscal is a term in Mexico for a form of fuel fraud in which gasoline and diesel are imported into the country under incorrect tariff classifications to evade taxes and excise duties. The misclassification is done by declaring the fuel in customs declarations as different products with lower or no tax liability. The scheme benefits from the fact that domestic fuel prices in Mexico, which include tax, are at times higher than international fuel prices, providing smugglers with a financial incentive to import and sell it in the country. This criminal activity gained prominence in 2018 and has been tied to corruption cases in ports and government agencies. The term derives from huachicol, a Mexican Spanish slang word originally referring to an adulterated drink and stolen fuel.

== Scheme ==
In Mexico, huachicol fiscal refers to a fraud scheme in which gasoline and diesel are brought into the country under false tariff codes and classifications to circumvent taxes and excise duties. Perpetrators typically mislabel the fuel as other products subject to lower or no taxation. The scheme benefits from the fact that fuel prices in Mexico, which are subject to taxes, are at times higher than international fuel prices, which creates a market for such activity. The word huachicol is a Mexican Spanish slang term that originally referred to an adulterated alcoholic drink and later came to be associated with stolen fuel. The term huachicol fiscal is distinct from huachicol, as it does not involve the physical theft of fuel but instead refers to tax fraud carried out through the scheme.

In the 2010s, fuel prices in Mexico were substantially higher than international prices, partly due to the Special Tax on Production and Services (IEPS), a special excise tax that accounted for a significant portion of the final retail price. Criminal groups exploited this structure by purchasing fuel at lower prices abroad, often in the United States, and importing it into Mexico while falsely declaring it as tax-exempt products. Such misclassifications commonly include labeling fuel as lubricants or additives. To facilitate the scheme, operators falsified cargo manifests and import documentation and used shell companies to conceal the true nature of the shipments.

Once inside Mexico, the fuel is distributed through criminal or semi-legal networks and sold as ordinary fuel. Because the IEPS tax is evaded, those involved in the scheme are able to capture both the standard commercial profit margin and the roughly 40 percent tax component, while still offering the fuel at market prices. The resulting profits are shared among the criminal group leading the scheme and distributed across a broader network of co-conspirators, including corrupt public officials and private-sector actors who facilitate the scheme by falsifying documentation, providing logistical support, granting access to ports or customs processes, or deliberately failing to enforce regulations.

The scheme has resulted in substantial losses of public revenue for the Mexican government. In 2024, the Mexican Tax Authority (SAT) estimated losses of approximately MXN$200 billion, representing funds that would otherwise have been allocated to public services. This amount was roughly equivalent to Mexico's entire federal security budget that year. Estimates from the Mexican government suggest that the resulting fiscal losses to the state amount to tens of billions of pesos annually.

== Investigations ==
Beginning in 2018, Mexican civil society organizations and investigative journalists warned of the emergence of huachicol fiscal as a form of fuel-related crime in Mexico. Government responses remained limited, allowing the practice to expand during the 2020s. Investigations by civil society organizations, journalists, and state institutions identified networks of collusion involving senior government officials, customs and port authorities, and politically connected business entities, leading them to conclude that huachicol fiscal constituted a case of systemic corruption.

One of the major government responses against huachicol fiscal occurred in 2020, when then President Andrés Manuel López Obrador (AMLO) announced that he was going to transfer the control of Mexico's ports and customs operations to the Mexican Navy (SEMAR), stating that military oversight would reduce corruption and curb large-scale smuggling. By 2022, all the ports and custom operations were under military control.

=== 2025 Mexican fuel smuggling scandal ===
In March 2025, the Secretariat of the Navy (SEMAR) seized the oil tanker Challenge Procyon at the port of Tampico, carrying about 10 million litres of diesel that had been declared as oil additives. The seizure exposed a network of naval officers, customs officials, and private companies that had imported fuel under false tariff classifications since at least 2023, laundering the proceeds through dozens of shell companies; investigators estimated losses to the treasury in the billions of dollars.

The investigation implicated Vice Admiral Manuel Roberto Farías Laguna and his brother, Rear Admiral Fernando Farías Laguna—nephews of former Secretary of the Navy José Rafael Ojeda Durán—as well as retired captain Miguel Ángel Solano Ruiz. In September 2025, federal authorities arrested fourteen people and said they were seeking more than 200 further arrest warrants; several officials linked to the case died during the investigation, and Solano Ruiz became a fugitive. The case became a major test for President Claudia Sheinbaum, whose government opened internal investigations across several ports and ordered a special inter-agency task force against huachicol fiscal.

=== Senator Adán Augusto López Hernández ===
According to FGR files citing Torres Joaquín's testimony, Mexican politician Adán Augusto López Hernández was linked to the Tampico port scheme through a business intermediary, Saúl Vera Ochoa. López Hernández has denied the claims, characterizing them as politically motivated. In August 2020, Vera Ochoa founded Tampico Terminal Marítima S.A. de C.V., which was granted the concession for Muelle Fiscal 289 at the port of Tampico that same month. In 2022, Vera Ochoa publicly supported López Hernández's presidential aspirations, while he was serving as a senator.

According to Torres Joaquín, Muelle Fiscal 289 was repeatedly used to unload stolen fuel tankers without proper inspections. His testimony identifies Tampico Terminal Marítima as a key logistical point in the illicit fuel import network. Investigators also identified irregularities at Tampico Terminal Marítima. The company is composed of four Tabasco-based firms, all owned by Vera Ochoa or his associates. (Note: The companies were Constructora Veasa, Multiservicios RYC, Acuitab, and VOS Grupo Constructor.) One of the four shareholders, Acuitab, was incorporated at a notary office owned by López Hernández. Torres Joaquín also testified that he received bribes in exchange for allowing vessels to dock at Muelle Fiscal 289 without inspection. He stated that the payments were delivered by Antonio Dávila Capiterucho, who is listed in the Public Registry of Property and Commerce as the administrator of Tampico Terminal Marítima, the company owned by Vera Ochoa. Capiterucho was a former manager of the National Water Commission (CONAGUA).

== See also ==
- Corruption in Mexico
