= Sebastião Mendes (footballer) =

Brazilian footballer

Mendes
Personal information
- Full name: Sebastião Mendes Neto
- Date of birth: 8 April 1945 (age 81)
- Place of birth: São Paulo, Brazil
- Position: Centre-back

Youth career
- Corinthians

Senior career*
Years	Team	Apps	(Gls)
1965–1970	Corinthians	66	(0)
1971–1972	São Bento		
1972–1973	Remo		
1974–1977	Portuguesa	202	(4)
1978–1979	Fortaleza		
1979	Potiguar de Mossoró		
- * Club domestic league appearances and goals as of 1 February 2024

Sebastião Mendes (born 8 April 1945), is a Brazilian former professional footballer who played as a centre-back.

== Career ==
Revealed in the Corinthians youth category, Mendes stood out for his virile game and for frequently provoking his opponents, which earned him a large number of expulsions. He was state champion in 1973 in Remo and later played for Portuguesa, where he made 202 appearances.

== Personal life ==
Mendes is the brother of the also footballer, Isidoro Mendes, with whom he played together for Portuguesa on several occasions.

== Honours ==
Remo

- Campeonato Paraense: 1973

Portuguesa

- Copa Governador do Estado de São Paulo: 1976
