= Mem (given name) =

Mem is a Portuguese and English given name. The Portuguese name is an alternative form of Mendo.

"Mem" is also used as a male and female nickname.

Notable people with the name include:

== People with the given name ==
- Mem de Sá (c. 1500 – 1572), Governor-General of Brazil
- Mem Ferda (born 1963), British screen actor
- Mem Nahadr (fl. from 1997), American performance artist
- Mem Rodrigues de Briteiros (c. 1225 – c. 1270), Portuguese nobleman
- Mem Shannon (born 1959), American blues musician
- Mem Soares de Melo, 1st Lord de Melo (c. 1200 – 1262), Portuguese nobleman

== People with the nickname ==
- Mem Fox (Marrion Fox; born 1946), Australian author
- Mem Lovett (Merritt Lovett; 1912–1995), American baseball player
- Mem Morrison (Mehmet Muhaurem Ramadan, fl. from 1997)), British performance artist
