= Omar García Harfuch =

Mexican police officer and politician

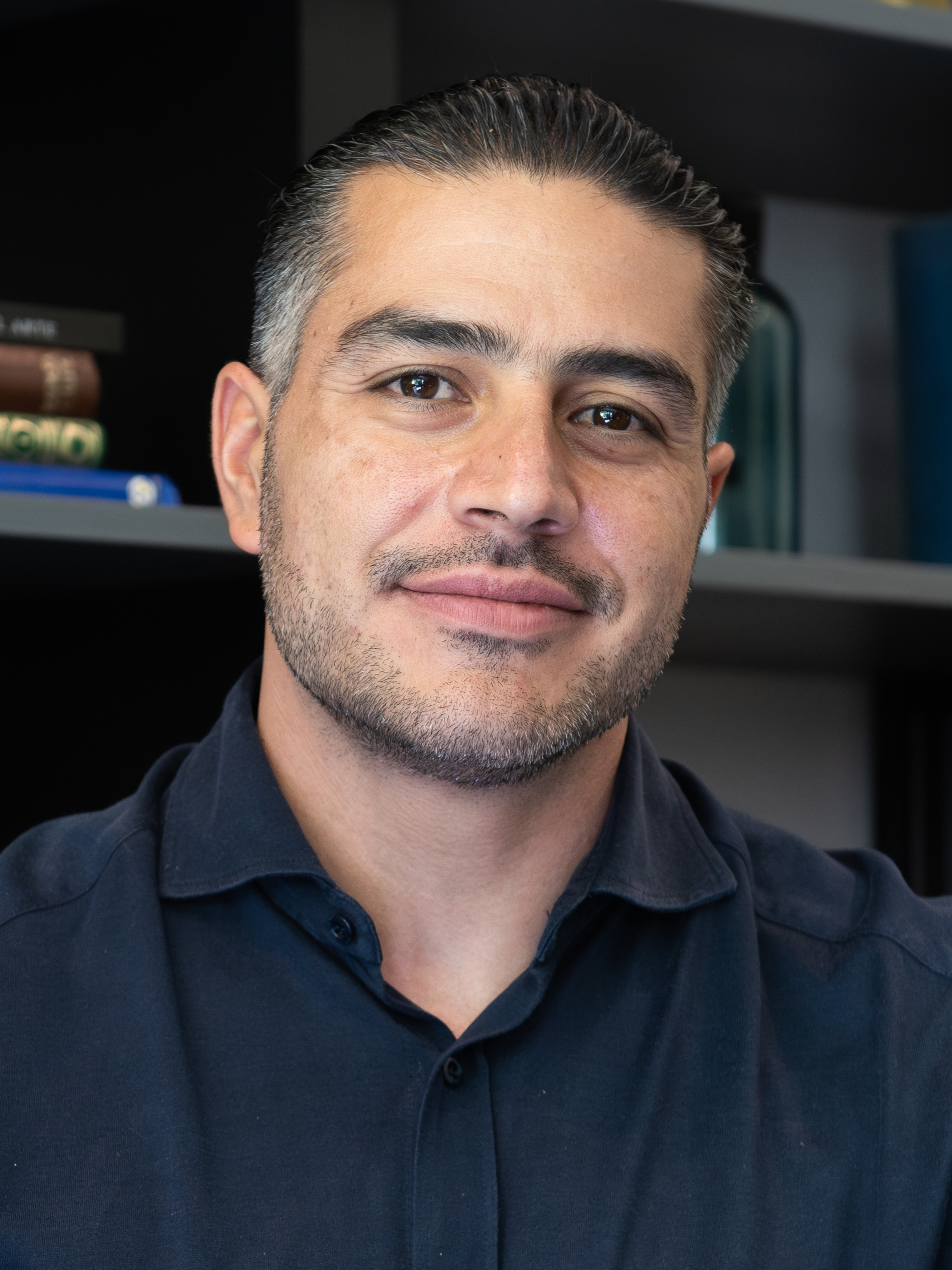
- García Harfuch in 2023

Secretary of Security and Citizen Protection
- Incumbent
- Assumed office 1 October 2024
- President: Claudia Sheinbaum
- Preceded by: Rosa Icela Rodríguez

Secretary of Citizen Security of Mexico City
- In office 4 October 2019 – 9 September 2023
- Head of Government: Claudia Sheinbaum; Martí Batres
- Preceded by: Jesús Orta Martínez
- Succeeded by: Pablo Vázquez Camacho

Personal details
- Born: Omar Hamid García Harfuch; 25 February 1982 (age 44) Cuernavaca, Morelos, Mexico
- Party: Morena (since 2023)
- Education: Universidad del Valle de México

Omar Hamid García Harfuch (Note: In this Mexican name, the surname is García and the second or maternal family name is Harfuch.) (born 25 February 1982) is a Mexican politician, public official, and former police chief. A member of the National Regeneration Movement (Morena) since 2023, he has served as Secretary of Security and Citizen Protection in the cabinet of President Claudia Sheinbaum since 2024. He served as Secretary of Citizen Security of Mexico City from 2019 to 2023, during Sheinbaum's term as head of government of Mexico City.

García Harfuch was a contender to represent Morena in the 2024 election for head of government of Mexico City. Despite winning his party's internal poll for the position, he was replaced by Clara Brugada as the candidate owing to gender-parity rules.

== Early life and education ==
García Harfuch was born in Cuernavaca, Morelos, in 1982. He completed a BA in law and public security at the Universidad del Valle de México.

His mother is María Harfuch Hidalgo, an actress and singer known by the stage name María Sorté. Her surname, "Harfuch", reflects her father's Lebanese ancestry. His father was Javier García Paniagua, who served as president of the Institutional Revolutionary Party (PRI) and Labour Secretary in 1981. His father was accused of participating in repression and torture during the Mexican Dirty War and was head of the Federal Security Directorate (DFS) from 1976 to 1978. García Harfuch's grandfather was General Marcelino García Barragán, Secretary of National Defense in 1968, who executed the order for that year's Tlatelolco massacre.

== Policing career ==
His career in public service began in 2008 when he joined the Federal Police. In 2012 he was promoted to state coordinator of the Federal Police in Guerrero and, in 2015, to the Criminal Investigation Agency of the Attorney-General's office (FGR).

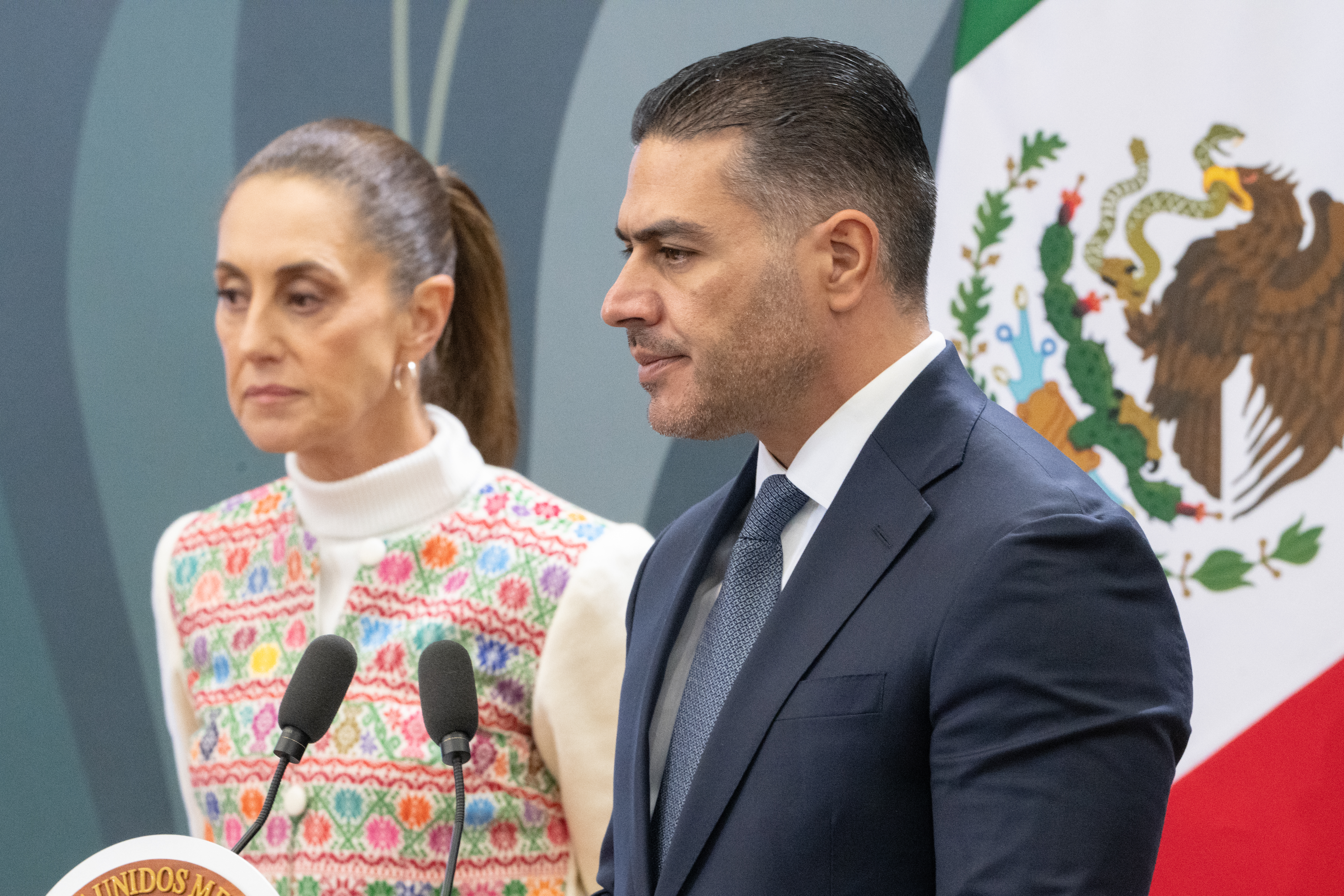
García Harfuch with President Claudia Sheinbaum in January 2026.

On 4 October 2019, he was appointed Chief of Police in the Mexico City government's Secretariat of Citizen Security by Mayor Claudia Sheinbaum. According to The Economist, Harfuch's tenure as Chief of Police was a success, with a 40% reduction in the city's homicide rate. Sheinbaum and Harfuch increased pay and training for police and purged corrupt officers.

=== Attempted assassination ===
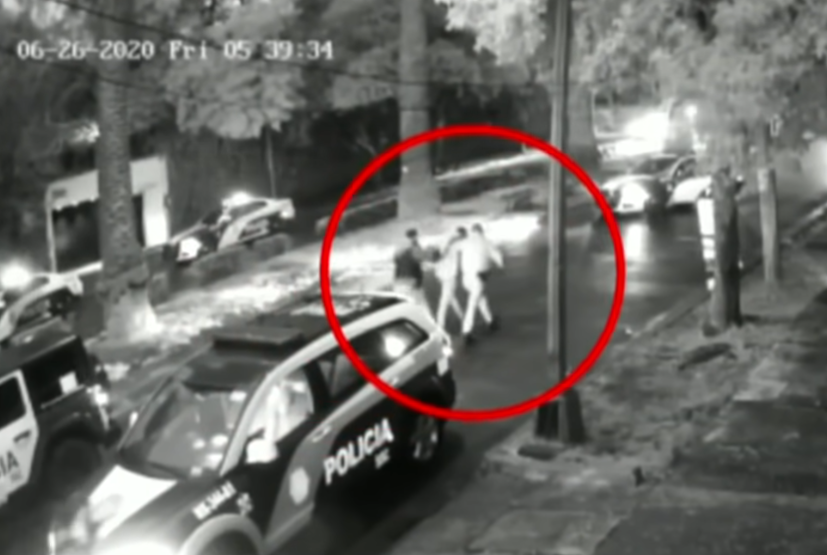
Arrest of one of the attackers who targeted Omar García Harfuch on June 26, 2020 image captured on CCTV

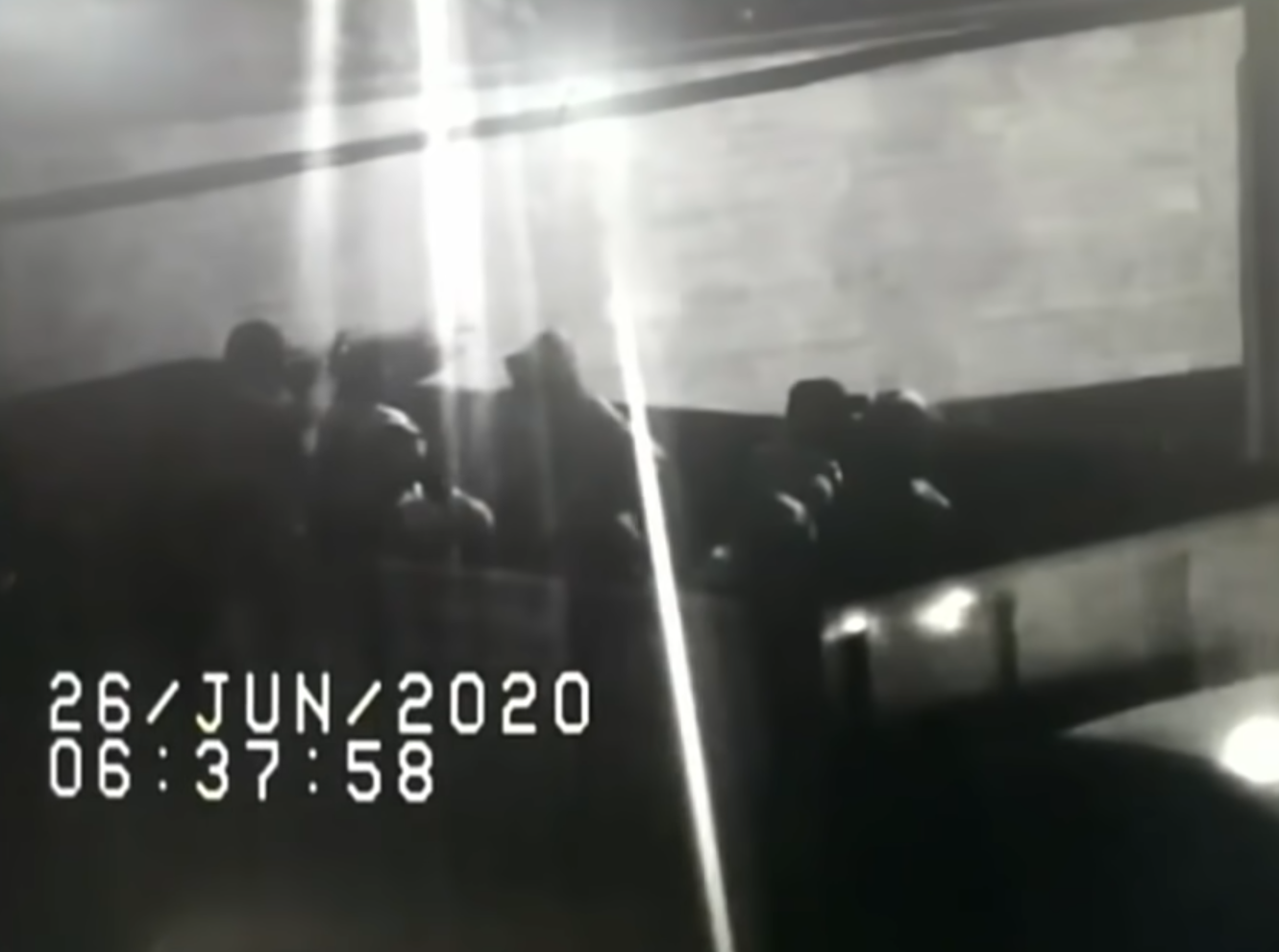
Assailants attacking Omar García Harfuch on June 26, 2020

On 26 June 2020, while serving as Chief of Police, at 6:38 a.m. local time García Harfuch was traveling in his vehicle in Mexico City's Paseo de la Reforma when members of the Jalisco New Generation Cartel carried out an armed attack against him firing more than 400 rounds in 3 minutes, causing him three gunshot wounds which were non life-threatening; two members of his security detail and a woman who was passing by the ambush site were killed. 14 attackers were arrested.

In March 2024, the Mexico City Attorney General’s office reported that twelve of the participants in the attack were convicted of aggravated homicide and attempted aggravated homicide. The authority indicated that they received a cumulative sentence of 316 years and 8 months in prison, although according to the Penal Code they will serve a maximum of 70 years, in addition to paying full reparations to the victims.

== Political career ==
In September 2023, he joined the National Regeneration Movement (Morena) and announced his plans to seek the party's nomination for the position of head of government of Mexico City. His primary opponent for the nomination was Clara Brugada, mayor of the borough of Iztapalapa. Polling conducted in October 2023 found him to be the most popular candidate among voters, taking 33% to Brugada's 21%. Despite winning the internal selection process, his candidacy was set aside in favor of Brugada's because of gender-parity rules.

García Harfuch sought election to be one of Mexico City's two senators in the 2024 Senate election, occupying the first place on the Sigamos Haciendo Historia coalition's two-name formula alongside Ernestina Godoy Ramos. The coalition won the election with 54.3% of the vote, assuring Senate seats for the formula's two members. On 5 July 2024, however, president-elect Claudia Sheinbaum announced that García Harfuch was to serve in her cabinet as secretary of security and civilian protection as of 1 October. His Senate seat was assumed by his alternate, Francisco Chíguil Figueroa.

== Controversies ==
=== Link to the forced disappearance of 43 students from Ayotzinapa ===
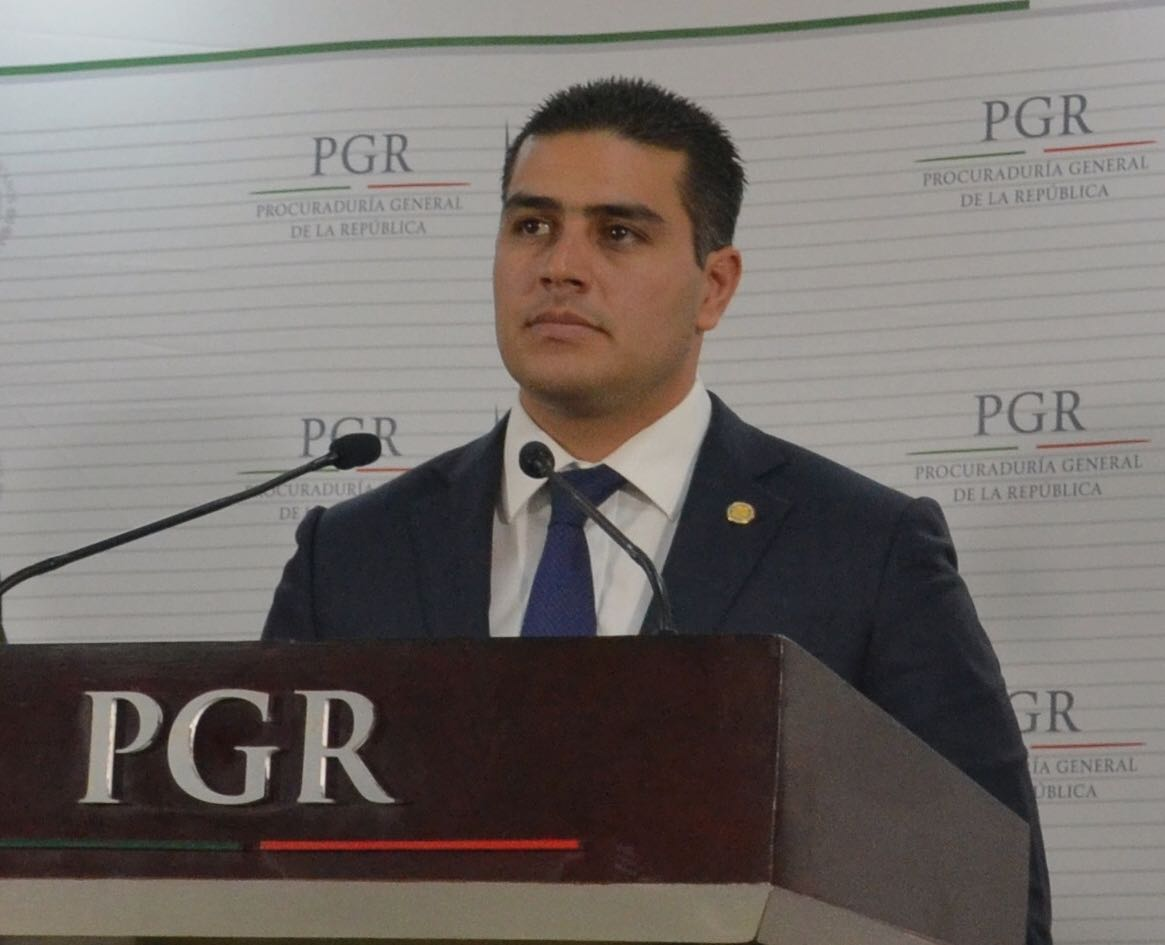
Omar García Harfuch giving a lecture at the PGR in 2017

In August 2022, then Undersecretary for Human Rights Alejandro Encinas presented conclusions from the report of the Commission for Truth and Access to Justice on the Ayotzinapa case, which indicated the existence of meetings between federal, state, and municipal authorities held in October 2014, after the students' disappearance in Iguala.

According to Encinas, Omar García Harfuch's name appears in records of these meetings, in his capacity as then commander of the Federal Police in Guerrero. Several media outlets have reported his possible presence at these meetings, including Proceso and Excélsior.

García Harfuch has rejected the accusations in public statements, asserting that he did not participate in the construction of the so-called “historical truth” nor in the events related to the students' disappearance.

For his part, then-President Andrés Manuel López Obrador stated that his presence at these meetings did not imply participation in the students' disappearance and that there was no evidence directly linking him to the events.

=== Sinaloa Cartel ===
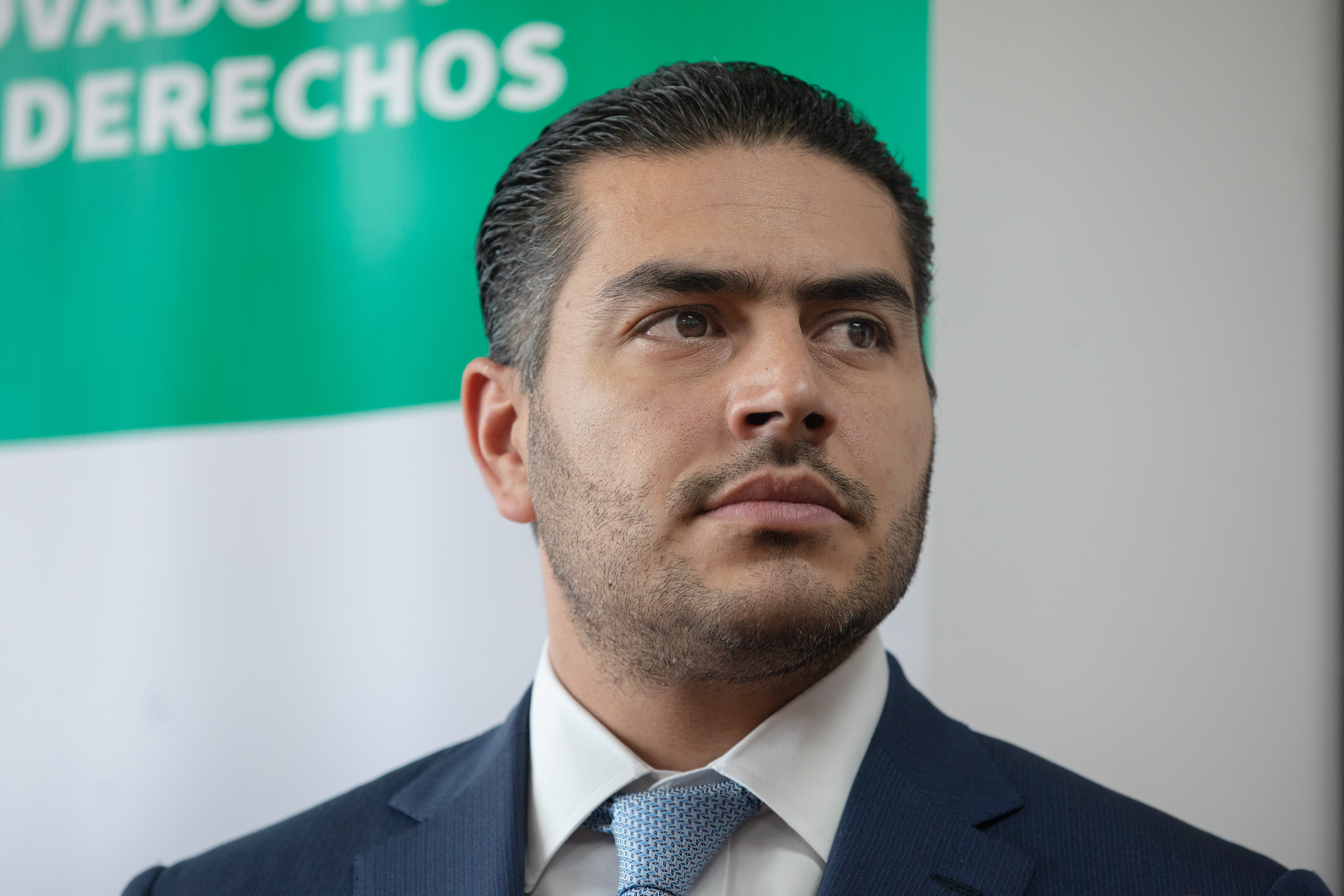
Omar García Harfuch in 2019

According to investigations conducted by journalist Anabel Hernández, published in her book "The Secret History: AMLO and the Sinaloa Cartel," Julián García, cousin of Omar García Harfuch, claimed to have full knowledge that Omar García Harfuch and other relatives are involved with the Sinaloa Cartel. This was confirmed by the accusation made by "Mini Lic" in 2023 in a column published by journalist Anabel Hernández in the German media outlet Deutsche Welle, in which he stated that García Harfuch allegedly received a one million dollar bribe from Los Chapitos in exchange for arresting Dámaso López Núñez alias “El Licenciado” who for many years served as Joaquín “El Chapo” Guzmán’s right-hand man.

According to the complaint, this money was allegedly given to García Harfuch when he served as head of the Criminal Investigation Agency (AIC) during the administration of Enrique Peña Nieto. The "Mini Lic" also alleged in the interview with Anabel Hernández that García Harfuch supposedly stole approximately two million dollars from his father during the 2017 operation in which he was arrested in Mexico City.

DEA agents who were allegedly assigned to the United States Embassy in Mexico informed Anabel Hernández that there are supposedly wiretapped recordings of criminal groups in which they discovered the modus operandi of García Harfuch and his team to keep the money and drugs they found in their operations.

Following the publication of the statements, Omar García Harfuch rejected the accusations and stated that his only connection to Dámaso López Serrano and other members of the Sinaloa Cartel was his participation in operations to arrest them. He also maintained that the accusations were intended to damage his reputation for political purposes.
