= Cabinet of Claudia Sheinbaum =

Incumbent government of Mexico (2024–present)

Sheinbaum Cabinet
- Cabinet of Mexico
- 2024–present
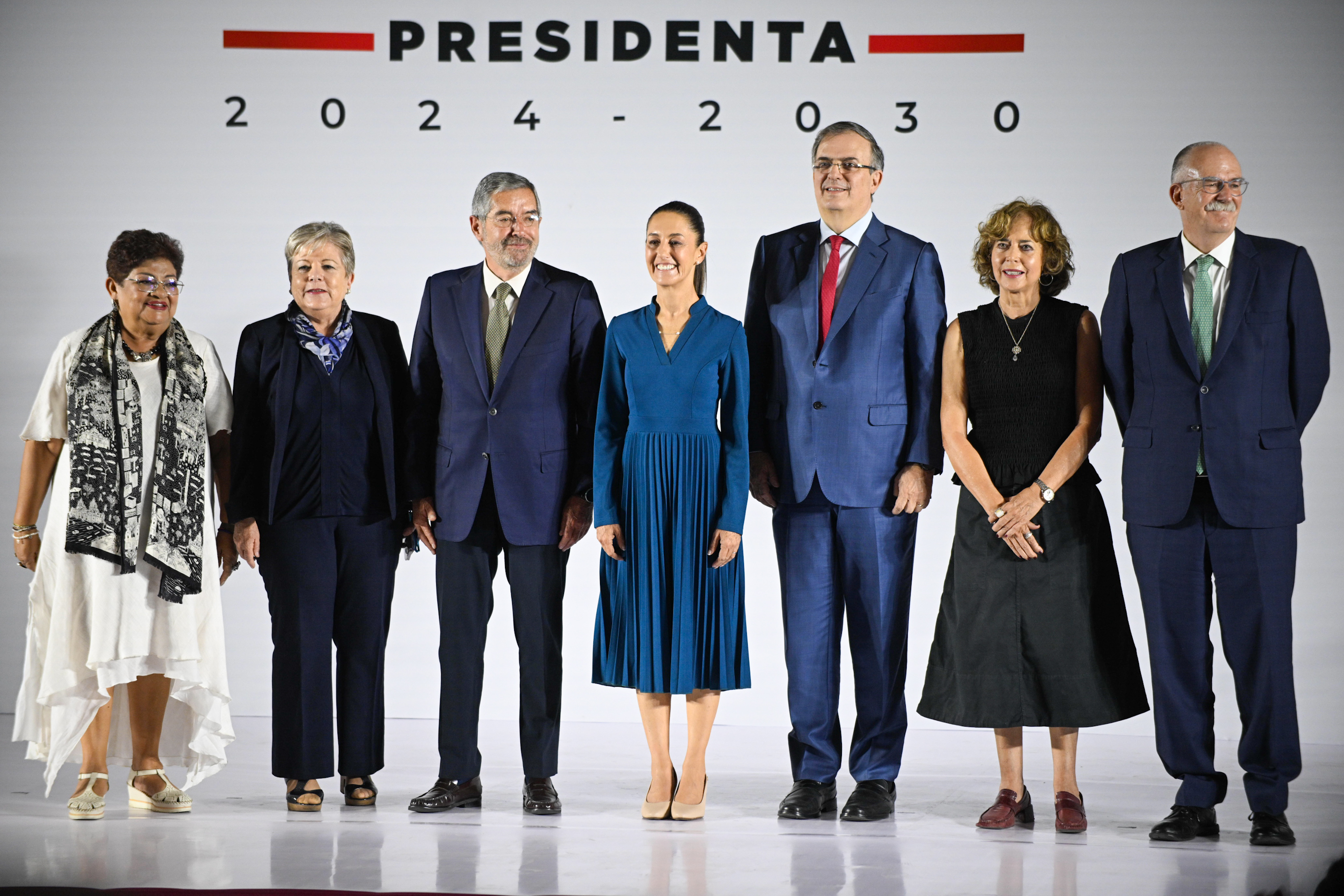
- First 6 members of the Sheinbaum cabinet, September 2024
- Date formed: 1 October 2024

People and organisations
- President: Claudia Sheinbaum
- President's history: Head of Government of Mexico City (2018–2023); Mayor of Tlalpan (2015–2017); Secretary of the Environment of the Federal District (2000–2006)
- Total no. of members: 23 (Federal Public Administration)
- Status in legislature: Majority government

History
- Election: 2024 general election
- Legislature term: LXVI Legislature of the Mexican Congress
- Predecessor: Cabinet of Andrés Manuel López Obrador

Claudia Sheinbaum assumed office as the 66th president of Mexico on 1 October 2024. Under the Mexican Constitution, the president has the authority to directly appoint members of the federal cabinet, who do not require legislative confirmation.

== Reforms to the Federal Public Administration ==
On 28 November 2024, Sheinbaum enacted a reform to the Organic Law of the Federal Public Administration that created three new federal entities and reorganized an existing one. The Secretariat of Women replaced the National Institute for Women, assuming responsibility for coordinating federal policy on gender equality, the prevention of gender-based violence, and the protection of women’s rights. The Secretariat of Science, Humanities, Technology, and Innovation succeeded the National Council of Humanities, Sciences, and Technologies (CONAHCYT), taking over the planning and coordination of national public policy in scientific research, technological development, and innovation. The Digital Transformation and Telecommunications Agency was established to concentrate federal digital government functions, including the modernization of administrative procedures and the coordination of telecommunications and digital public services. The reform also replaced the Secretariat of the Civil Service with the Secretariat of Anticorruption and Good Governance, expanding its role to include the design and coordination of federal anti-corruption policy, oversight of public administration, and the promotion of transparency and accountability.

As part of a broader centralization of federal government functions, on 20 December 2024, Sheinbaum published a reform dissolving seven autonomous agencies and transferring their responsibilities to cabinet secretariats. Under the reform, the Secretariat of Anti-Corruption and Good Governance assumed the transparency and data protection functions of the National Institute of Transparency for Access to Information and Personal Data Protection (INAI), while the Secretariat of Energy absorbed the regulatory functions of the Energy Regulatory Commission (CRE) and the National Hydrocarbons Commission (CNH). Educational evaluation functions previously carried out by National Institute for the Evaluation of Education (MejorEdu) were transferred to the Secretariat of Public Education, and poverty measurement and social policy evaluation formerly conducted by the National Council for the Evaluation of Social Development Policy (CONEVAL) were reassigned to the autonomous National Institute of Statistics and Geography (INEGI). The competition functions of the Federal Economic Competition Commission (COFECE) and the competition-related functions of the Federal Telecommunications Institute (IFT) were assigned to a newly created National Antitrust Commission, a decentralized agency of the executive, and other telecommunications regulatory functions formerly under the IFT were to be assumed by the Secretariat of Infrastructure, Communications and Transportation.

== Cabinet ==
Shortly after the 2024 general election, Sheinbaum began announcing her cabinet appointments in phases. The first set of appointments was announced on 20 June 2024, with additional appointments revealed weekly through 18 July. On 6 September, she announced her appointments to the Secretariat of National Defense and the Secretariat of the Navy.

The cabinet has been noted for its gender parity, with women holding roughly half of the cabinet posts, and for its continuity with the administration of her predecessor, Andrés Manuel López Obrador. Several appointees had served in López Obrador’s cabinet, including Rogelio Ramírez de la O, Marcelo Ebrard, Marath Baruch Bolaños López, and Ariadna Montiel Reyes, while others were drawn from Sheinbaum’s team during her tenure as Head of Government of Mexico City, such as Omar García Harfuch, Luz Elena González Escobar, Jesús Antonio Esteva Medina, and Ernestina Godoy Ramos. The cabinet also included Mario Delgado, who served as Morena's president and as general coordinator of Sheinbaum's presidential campaign. In addition to career politicians, Sheinbaum appointed individuals with technical and academic backgrounds to senior posts, including Juan Ramón de la Fuente and David Kershenobich.

Post	Incumbent	Term
Secretary of the Interior	Rosa Icela Rodríguez	1 October 2024 – present
Secretary of Foreign Affairs	Juan Ramón de la Fuente	1 October 2024 – 1 April 2026
Secretary of Foreign Affairs	Roberto Velasco Álvarez	8 April 2026 – present
Secretary of Finance	Rogelio Ramírez de la O	1 October 2024 – 7 March 2025
Secretary of Finance	Edgar Amador Zamora	8 March 2025 – present
Secretary of Defense	Ricardo Trevilla Trejo	1 October 2024 – present
Secretary of Navy	Raymundo Morales Ángeles	1 October 2024 – present
Secretary of Security and Civilian Protection	Omar García Harfuch	1 October 2024 – present
Secretary of Welfare	Ariadna Montiel Reyes	1 October 2024 – 29 April 2026
Secretary of Welfare	Leticia Ramírez Amaya	29 April 2026 – present
Secretary of Environment	Alicia Bárcena	1 October 2024 – present
Secretary of Energy	Luz Elena González Escobar	1 October 2024 – present
Secretary of Economy	Marcelo Ebrard	1 October 2024 – present
Secretary of Agriculture	Julio Berdegué Sacristán	1 October 2024 – 1 May 2026
Secretary of Agriculture	Columba López Gutiérrez	1 May 2026 – present
Secretary of Infrastructure	Jesús Antonio Esteva Medina	1 October 2024 – present
Secretary of Anticorruption and Good Governance	Raquel Buenrostro Sánchez	1 October 2024 – present
Secretary of Education	Mario Delgado Carrillo	1 October 2024 – present
Secretary of Health	David Kershenobich	1 October 2024 – present
Secretary of Labor	Marath Baruch Bolaños López	1 October 2024 – present
Secretary of Agrarian, Land, and Urban Development	Edna Elena Vega	1 October 2024 – present
Secretary of Culture	Claudia Curiel de Icaza	1 October 2024 – present
Secretary of Tourism	Josefina Rodríguez Zamora	1 October 2024 – present
Secretary of Science, Humanities, Technology, and Innovation	Rosaura Ruiz Gutiérrez	1 January 2025 – present
Secretary of Women	Citlalli Hernández	1 January 2025 – 16 April 2026
Secretary of Women	Laura Itzel Castillo	3 September 2026 – present
Legal Counsel of the Federal Executive	Ernestina Godoy Ramos	1 October 2024 – 27 November 2025
Legal Counsel of the Federal Executive	Esthela Damián Peralta	17 December 2025 – 30 April 2026
Legal Counsel of the Federal Executive	Luisa María Alcalde Luján	4 May 2026 – present
Digital Transformation and Telecommunications Agency	José Antonio Peña Merino	1 January 2025 – present

== Changes in the Sheinbaum cabinet ==
This is a list of changes in the Sheinbaum cabinet since 1 October 2024.

Name	Post	Date of leaving cabinet	Reason
Rogelio Ramírez de la O	Secretary of Finance	7 March 2025	Ramírez de la O resigned citing personal reasons. He had previously agreed with President Sheinbaum to remain in office until the approval of the 2025 federal budget in December 2024 but extended his tenure until March 2025 in response to economic uncertainty caused by tariff threats from U.S. President Donald Trump.
Ernestina Godoy Ramos	Legal Counsel of the Federal Executive	27 November 2025	Godoy Ramos resigned to assume the interim leadership of the Attorney General's Office (FGR) following the resignation of Alejandro Gertz Manero. Earlier that day, he had appointed her to lead the Fiscalía Especial de Control Competencial, a position that automatically made her the acting head of the FGR under the governing statute.
Juan Ramón de la Fuente	Secretary of Foreign Affairs	1 April 2026	Ramón de la Fuente requested his resignation due to health issues, after previously taking a medical leave in November 2025 to undergo spinal surgery. He returned to his post in January 2026 but later stepped down to continue his recovery.
Citlalli Hernández	Secretary of Women	16 April 2026	Hernández resigned to assume a partisan role in the National Regeneration Movement (Morena), where she was tasked with coordinating alliances and electoral strategy ahead of the 2027 legislative election.
Ariadna Montiel Reyes	Secretary of Welfare	29 April 2026	Montiel Reyes resigned in order to contend for the presidency of Morena.
Esthela Damián Peralta	Legal Counsel of the Federal Executive	30 April 2026	On 22 April, Damián Peralta announced her intention to resign effective April 30 in order to seek Morena's nomination for governor of Guerrero in the 2027 state election. Her resignation took effect on 30 April.
Julio Berdegué Sacristán	Secretary of Agriculture	1 May 2026	

== See also ==
- Presidency of Claudia Sheinbaum
