= Presidency of Claudia Sheinbaum =

Presidential administration of Mexico since 2024

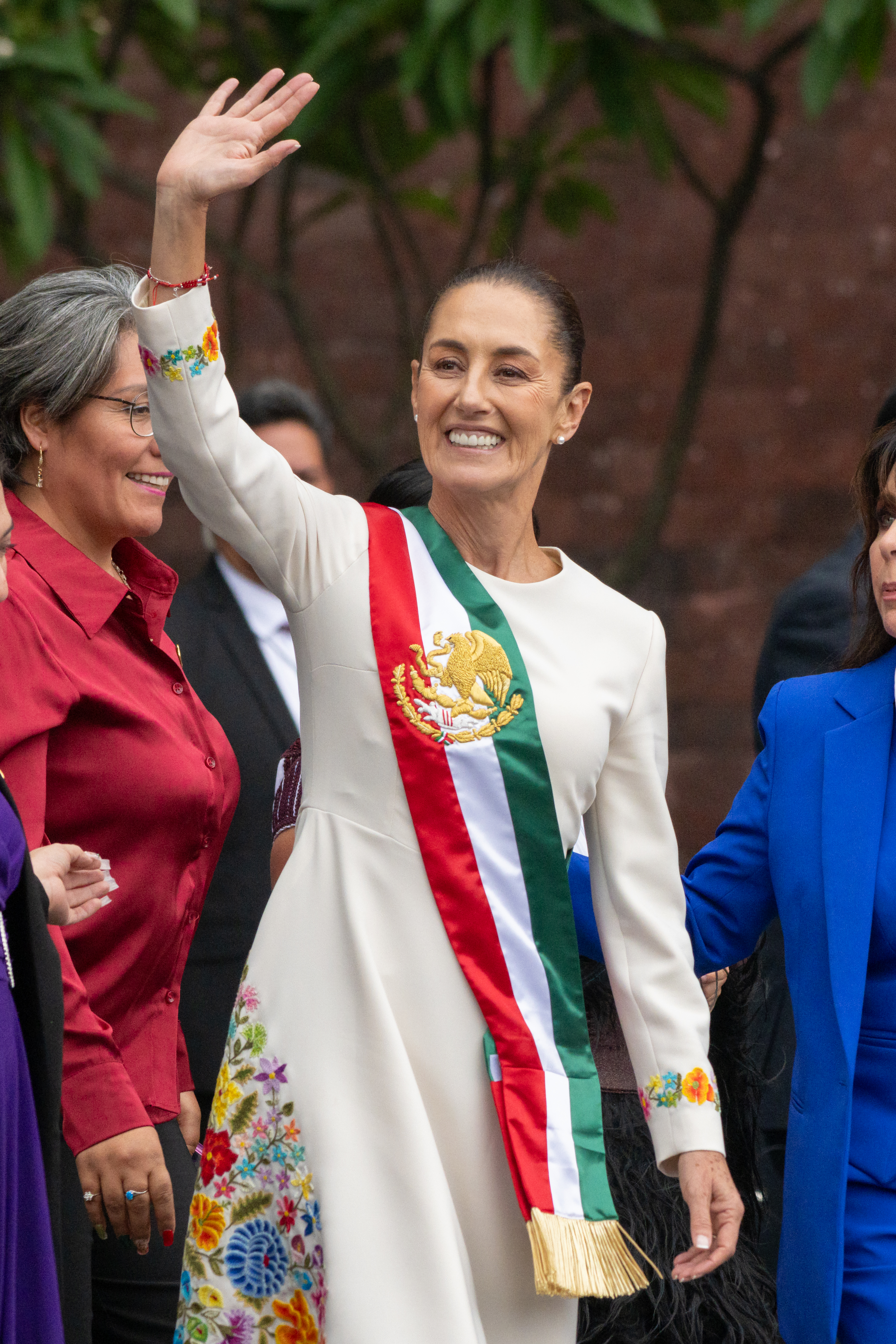
- Presidency of Claudia Sheinbaum; 1 October 2024 – present
- President: Claudia Sheinbaum
- Cabinet: Full list
- Party: Morena
- Election: 2024
- Seat: The National Palace
- Seal of the federal government

Claudia Sheinbaum's tenure as the 66th president of Mexico began with her inauguration on 1 October 2024. Sheinbaum, a member of the National Regeneration Movement (Morena), she previously served as head of government of Mexico City from 2018 to 2023 and assumed office after winning the 2024 Mexican general election in a landslide. Upon her inauguration, she became the first woman and the first Jewish person to hold the office. Alongside Sheinbaum's presidency, Morena and its coalition partners held supermajorities in both chambers of the Congress of the Union during the LXVI Legislature, facilitating the passage of constitutional reforms.

== 2024 election ==
=== General election ===
While serving as head of government of Mexico City, Sheinbaum announced her intention to resign from office in order to seek the presidential nomination of Juntos Hacemos Historia, a coalition encompassing the National Regeneration Movement, the Labor Party, and the Ecologist Green Party of Mexico. On 6 September, the coalition announced that Sheinbaum had won its internal selection process, defeating former foreign secretary Marcelo Ebrard. On 19 November 2023, Sheinbaum was registered as the presidential nominee of Sigamos Haciendo Historia, the successor coalition to Juntos Hacemos Historia. She campaigned on continuing Andrés Manuel López Obrador's Fourth Transformation policies.

2024 presidential election results by state

At 11:50 CST on 2 June 2024, Sheinbaum was projected the winner by the National Electoral Institute's quick count. Subsequent district-level tallies confirmed her victory by a wide margin, with Sheinbaum receiving 59.76% of the vote, carrying 31 of the country’s 32 states, and securing the highest number of votes ever recorded for a presidential candidate in Mexico, as well as the largest vote share since free and fair elections began in Mexico.

=== Transition period ===
Following her electoral victory, Sheinbaum began outlining her presidential transition, holding meetings with outgoing president López Obrador to discuss legislative priorities for the opening months of her administration. During the transition period, she announced her cabinet appointments in phases, met with governors and governors-elect to coordinate priorities for the 2025 federal budget, and confirmed her intention to continue López Obrador’s daily morning press conferences, known as mañaneras.

== Inauguration ==
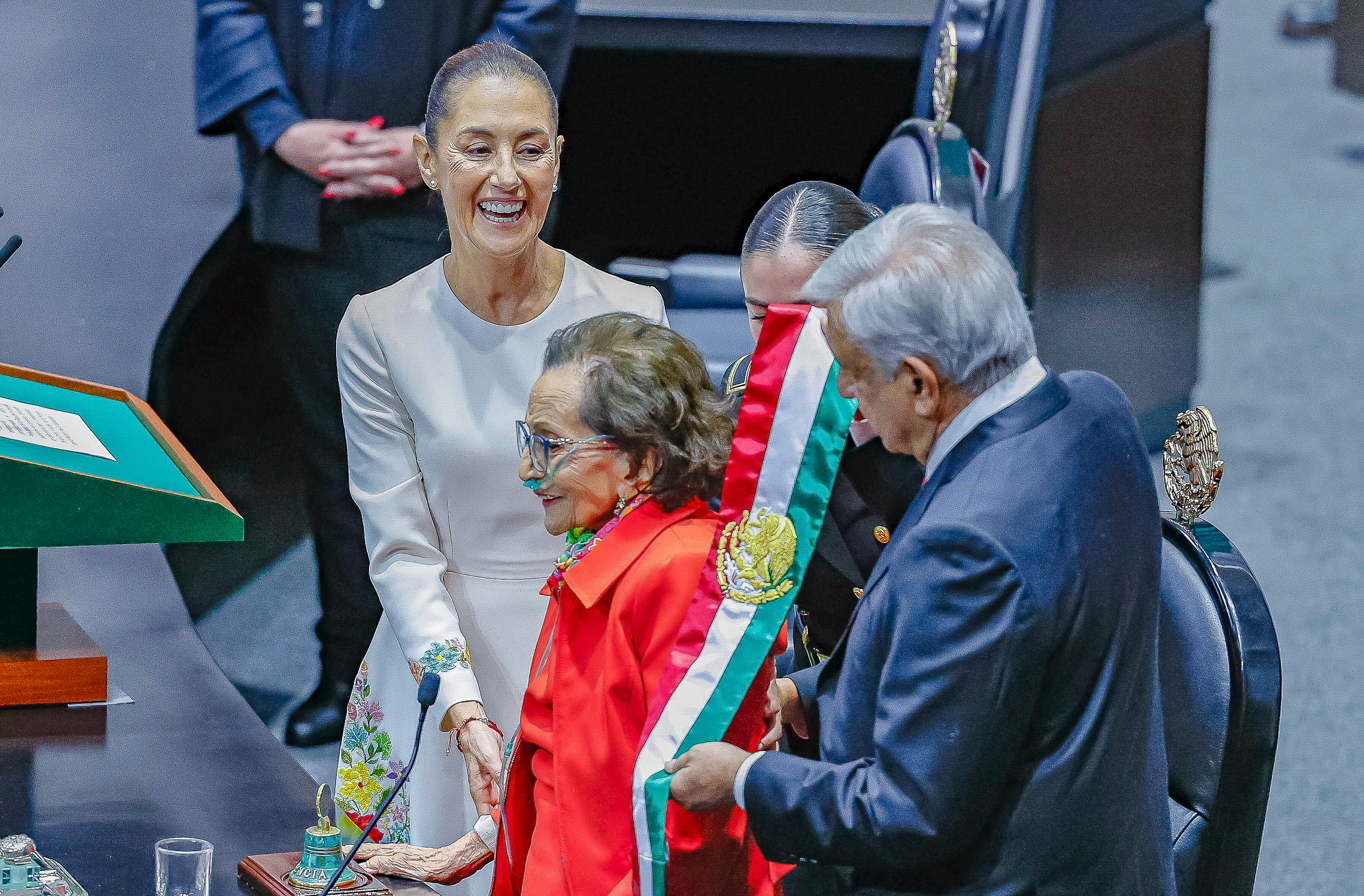
Andrés Manuel López Obrador hands the presidential sash to Ifigenia Martínez, who then presents it to Sheinbaum during her inauguration.

On 1 October 2024 at 11:31 CST, Sheinbaum took the oath of office as outlined in Article 87 of the Mexican Constitution. At the main podium, she was accompanied by Gerardo Fernández Noroña, the President of the Senate; Andrés Manuel López Obrador, the outgoing president; Ifigenia Martínez y Hernández, the President of the Chamber of Deputies; and Norma Lucía Piña Hernández, the President of the Supreme Court of Justice. The officials were flanked by female cadets representing each branch of the armed forces, drawn from the Heroic Military Academy, the Escuela Militar de Aviación, and the Heroica Escuela Naval Militar. Following the oath, Martínez y Hernández placed the presidential sash on Sheinbaum, who then delivered an inaugural address to Congress in which she thanked her predecessor, noted the historic significance of her election as the country’s first woman president, pledged to maintain responsible fiscal policies, and sought to reassure foreign investors.

The inauguration was attended by 105 foreign representatives, including delegates of international organizations. Among the foreign dignitaries present were the following heads of state and government:

- Johnny Briceño, Prime minister of Belize
- Luis Arce, President of Bolivia
- Luiz Inácio Lula da Silva, President of Brazil
- Gabriel Boric, President of Chile
- Gustavo Petro, President of Colombia
- Miguel Díaz-Canel, President of Cuba
- Xiomara Castro, President of Honduras
- Roosevelt Skerrit, Prime Minister of Dominica
- Luis Abinader, President of the Dominican Republic
- Bernardo Arévalo, President of Guatemala
- Nana Akufo-Addo, President of Ghana
- Mohamed al-Menfi, Chairman of the Presidential Council of Libya
- Santiago Peña, President of Paraguay
- Bouchraya Hammoudi Bayoun, Prime Minister of the Sahrawi Arab Democratic Republic
- Philip J. Pierre, Prime minister of Saint Lucia

Other notable attendees included former German president Christian Wulff, and US first lady Jill Biden. King Felipe VI of Spain was controversially not invited, with Sheinbaum citing his failure to respond to López Obrador's 2019 letter requesting an apology for the abuses committed during the Spanish conquest. This prompted a boycott by the Spanish government.

== Cabinet ==
Cabinet of Sheinbaum
Office	Name	Term
President	Claudia Sheinbaum	2024–present
Secretary of the Interior	Rosa Icela Rodríguez	2024–present
Secretary of Foreign Affairs	Juan Ramón de la Fuente	2024–2026
Roberto Velasco Álvarez	2026–present
Secretary of Defense	Ricardo Trevilla Trejo	2024–present
Secretary of the Navy	Raymundo Pedro Morales Ángeles	2024–present
Secretary of Security	Omar García Harfuch	2024–present
Secretary of Finance	Rogelio Ramírez de la O	2024–2025
Edgar Amador Zamora	2025–present
Secretary of Welfare	Ariadna Montiel Reyes	2024–present
Secretary of Environment and Natural Resources	Alicia Bárcena	2024–present
Secretary of Energy	Luz Elena González Escobar	2024–present
Secretary of Economy	Marcelo Ebrard	2024–present
Secretary of Agriculture and Rural Development	Julio Berdegué Sacristán	2024–present
Secretary of Infrastructure	Jesús Antonio Esteva Medina	2024–present
Secretary of Public Education	Mario Delgado Carrillo	2024–present
Secretary of Health	David Kershenobich	2024–present
Secretary of Tourism	Josefina Rodríguez Zamora	2024–present
Secretary of Labor and Social Welfare	Marath Baruch Bolaños López	2024–present
Secretary of Agrarian, Land, and Urban Development	Edna Elena Vega	2024–present
Secretary of Culture	Claudia Curiel de Icaza	2024–present
Legal Counsel	Ernestina Godoy Ramos	2024–2025
Esthela Damián Peralta	2025–present

Sheinbaum's initial cabinet was described as a mix of political allies and appointees with academic or specialized professional backgrounds. Several figures from López Obrador's administration remained in office, including Rogelio Ramírez de la O as Secretary of Finance and Ariadna Montiel Reyes as Secretary of Welfare. Rosa Icela Rodríguez was named Secretary of the Interior, having previously served as López Obrador's Secretary of Security and Civilian Protection and as Sheinbaum's government secretary in Mexico City. Mario Delgado, who served as Morena's president from 2020 to 2024 and as general coordinator of Sheinbaum's presidential campaign, was appointed Secretary of Education. From her Mexico City government, she appointed García Harfuch as Secretary of Security and Civilian Protection and Luz Elena González as Secretary of Energy. She also appointed her former presidential rival, Ebrard, as Secretary of Economy, a move seen by analysts and business groups as conciliatory toward Morena’s moderate, pro-business wing and as strengthening Mexico’s position ahead of the upcoming United States–Mexico–Canada Agreement (USMCA) review.

=== Reforms to the Federal Public Administration ===
On 28 November 2024, Sheinbaum enacted a reform to the Organic Law of the Federal Public Administration that created three new federal entities and reorganized an existing one. The Secretariat of Women replaced the National Institute for Women, assuming responsibility for coordinating federal policy on gender equality, the prevention of gender-based violence, and the protection of women’s rights. The Secretariat of Science, Humanities, Technology, and Innovation succeeded the National Council of Humanities, Sciences, and Technologies (CONAHCYT), taking over the planning and coordination of national public policy in scientific research, technological development, and innovation. The Digital Transformation and Telecommunications Agency was established to concentrate federal digital government functions, including the modernization of administrative procedures and the coordination of telecommunications and digital public services. The reform also replaced the Secretariat of the Civil Service with the Secretariat of Anticorruption and Good Governance, expanding its role to include the design and coordination of federal anti-corruption policy, oversight of public administration, and the promotion of transparency and accountability.

== Domestic affairs ==
=== Crime and the drug war ===
Sheinbaum receives a military salute from Ricardo Trevilla (left) and Raymundo Morales (right), both seen from behind, on 26 July 2025.

Sheinbaum’s security strategy is built around four core pillars: addressing the root causes of violence, strengthening the National Guard, enhancing intelligence and investigative capabilities, and maintaining constant communication between the security cabinet and the country's federative entities. She appointed Omar García Harfuch to head the Secretariat of Security and Civilian Protection's (SSCP), a role he previously held in her Mexico City cabinet. Her administration adopted a more hard-handed approach toward organized crime, with the SSCP going after organized crime's logistical networks and "violence generators", marking a departure from López Obrador's "hugs, not bullets" strategy.

==== Legislation ====
On 31 December 2024, Sheinbaum promulgated amendments to Article 21 that expanded the powers of the Secretariat of Security and Civilian Protection (SSPC), granting the civilian-led secretariat authority to conduct criminal investigations and intelligence-gathering activities and designating it as the coordinating body of the National Intelligence System, responsible for integrating information from federal, state, and municipal police forces. The reform also authorized the SSPC to audit and oversee the use of federal public security funds allocated to state governments. Sheinbaum also enacted reforms to Article 19 expanding the catalogue of crimes subject to mandatory pre-trial detention, including extortion, contraband, the use of false tax receipts, and offenses related to the production, trafficking, and distribution of synthetic drugs such as fentanyl and its derivatives.

On 28 November 2025, Sheinbaum promulgated legislation which standardized the legal definition of extortion and its penalties nationwide, replacing previously disparate state-level frameworks. It introduced ex officio prosecution, allowing authorities to initiate investigations without a formal complaint from victims, particularly in cases involving protection rackets and digital extortion. The law established prison sentences ranging from 15 to 42 years for extortion offenses involving organized crime, public officials, or acts carried out from within penitentiary facilities.

==== Security and cartel violence ====
In March 2025, search collectives discovered a site known as Rancho Izaguirre in the municipality of Teuchitlán, Jalisco, which they described as a possible extermination camp. Federal authorities identified it as a facility used by the Jalisco New Generation Cartel (CJNG), with the Sheinbaum administration describing the site primarily as a forced recruitment and training center rather than an extermination camp. The Secretariat of Security and Civilian Protection and the Attorney General’s Office launched a federal investigation that led to multiple arrests, including Teuchitlán mayor José Asunción Murguía and alleged CJNG recruiter José Gregorio Hermida, known as "El Lastra". Murguía was charged with organized crime and forced disappearance, with prosecutors alleging that he provided municipal resources to the cartel in exchange for regular payments.

Violence in Michoacán escalated throughout 2025 amid a prolonged territorial conflict between the CJNG and the Cárteles Unidos alliance, accompanied by widespread extortion of the avocado and lime industries and the assassination of several local officials, including Uruapan mayor Carlos Manzo. Following mass demonstrations after Manzo's killing, Sheinbaum announced Plan Michoacán, a federal security initiative aimed at containing the violence and restoring state control. The plan involved the deployment of Army units, the National Guard, and naval personnel to strategic municipalities, highways, and rural corridors, the establishment of coordinated patrols and checkpoints, and the reinforcement of federal command over security operations in the state, alongside intelligence-led actions targeting extortion networks and cartel logistics.

=== Economy ===
In December 2025, Sheinbaum introduced a proposal to decrease the work week from 48 hours to 40 hours. It passed congress in February 2026 and is set to decrease the work week by two hours per year in 2027 to reach a 40-hour work week in 2030. She announced an increase to the minimum wage by 13% in December 2025.

=== Energy ===
Sheinbaum framed energy policy around the idea of energy sovereignty, combining a restoration of state primacy over Pemex and the Federal Electricity Commission (CFE) with an expansion of renewable generation. She inherited a sector under strain: Pemex carried financial debt of more than US$100 billion, crude output had fallen from 2.43 million barrels per day in 2014 to 1.76 million in 2024, about three-quarters of the natural gas consumed in Mexico was imported from the United States, and clean sources supplied under a quarter of electricity generation.

==== Sector reform ====
A constitutional amendment in force from 31 October 2024 reclassified the two firms from "productive state enterprises", the status created by the 2013 energy reform under Enrique Peña Nieto, to "public state companies" whose governing purpose was public service rather than profit. On 18 March 2025, the anniversary of the 1938 oil expropriation, she signed the implementing legislation: eight new statutes and amendments to three others, which created a National Energy Commission within the Secretariat of Energy and abolished the autonomous Energy Regulatory Commission and National Hydrocarbons Commission. The new Electricity Sector Law required that at least 54% of the energy injected into the grid each year come from CFE plants and introduced a "mixed development" model in which the utility holds a majority stake in jointly built projects.

==== Fuel prices ====
On 27 February 2025 the government signed a voluntary agreement with fuel retailers capping regular gasoline at 24 pesos per litre, with gross margins held near two pesos, and reinforced it by waiving part of the fuel excise week by week. The pact was renewed repeatedly, covering 96% of service stations by March 2026, and a further agreement on 17 April 2026 added a diesel ceiling of 28.30 pesos per litre; enforcement rested on the consumer protection agency Profeco, and Sheinbaum said on 20 April 2026 that about 45% of diesel-selling stations remained above the cap. By 2026 the ceilings were straining supply: delayed Pemex deliveries produced rolling shortages across retail networks, and gasoline and diesel inventories at Pemex and private terminals ran below their 2025 levels.

=== Health-care ===
In April 2026, Sheinbaum began the first phase in establishing a universal health care service. The implementation plans to distribute credencial health I.D. card to all citizens by 2026. The I.D. card will be linked to an application containing medical records, appointments, and available services. In 2027, universal emergency care; high-risk pregnancies and obstetric emergencies; heart attacks and strokes; breast cancer; universal vaccination; and basic consultations are planned to become available. By 2028, care for chronic conditions; specialist consultations and hospitalizations; and prescriptions will be included in the plan.

=== Infrastructure ===
==== Passenger rail ====
Sheinbaum made the expansion of Mexico’s passenger rail network a central component of her infrastructure agenda, advocating state-led development of intercity rail services. Her administration enacted a constitutional amendment restoring federal authority over passenger rail operations and announced plans to construct approximately 3,000 kilometres of new passenger rail lines nationwide. The proposed network includes the Mexico–Pachuca, Mexico–Nuevo Laredo, and Mexico–Nogales lines, to be developed in four phases.

In late 2024, Sheinbaum inaugurated the final sections of the Tren Maya and announced plans to integrate freight operations into the system, as well as future extensions toward Progreso, Yucatán. In March 2025, Sheinbaum announced the start of construction of the Tren Mexico–Pachuca, linking Mexico City with the state of Hidalgo and connecting to the AIFA branch of the Tren Suburbano. In April 2025, construction was launched on the Mexico City–Querétaro segment of the Tren Mexico–Nuevo Laredo. Later that year, in September, she announced the start of construction on the Saltillo–Nuevo Laredo segment of the same line, as well as the Querétaro–Irapuato leg of the Tren Mexico–Nogales.

In February 2026, Sheinbaum inaugurated the Santa Fe–Observatorio section of the Tren El Insurgente, completing the rail link between Mexico City and Toluca on a project whose construction began in 2014.

=== Welfare ===
Sheinbaum's administration emphasized the expansion and institutionalization of social welfare, establishing them as permanent state obligations rather than discretionary government policies. On 2 December 2024, she elevated several social programs to constitutional law.

Beginning in 2025, the government implemented and expanded a range of direct cash-transfer programs, including the launch of Pensión Mujeres Bienestar (lit. 'Women's Wellbeing Pension'), a bimonthly payment for women aged 60 to 64 who had not yet qualified for the universal pension for older adults, and the expansion of universal education scholarships at the basic education level through the Beca Universal "Rita Cetina Gutiérrez" (lit. 'Rita Cetina Gutiérrez Universal Scholarship'), extending regular financial support to students enrolled in public preschool, elementary, and secondary schools. In parallel, the government rolled out Salud Casa por Casa (lit. 'House to House Health'), a nationwide program deploying medical brigades to conduct home visits for older adults and people with disabilities.

In January 2025, Sheinbaum merged SEGALMEX and DICONSA into Alimentación para el Bienestar (lit. 'Food for Wellbeing'). As part of the reorganization, more than 24,500 DICONSA outlets were slated for rehabilitation and rebranding as Tiendas del Bienestar para Generar Felicidad (lit. 'Wellbeing Stores to Generate Happiness'), and the store network began distributing state-branded basic food items marketed under the Bienestar label, with the stated objectives of supporting small-scale producers and expanding access to affordable staple goods.

== Foreign policy ==
=== International trips ===
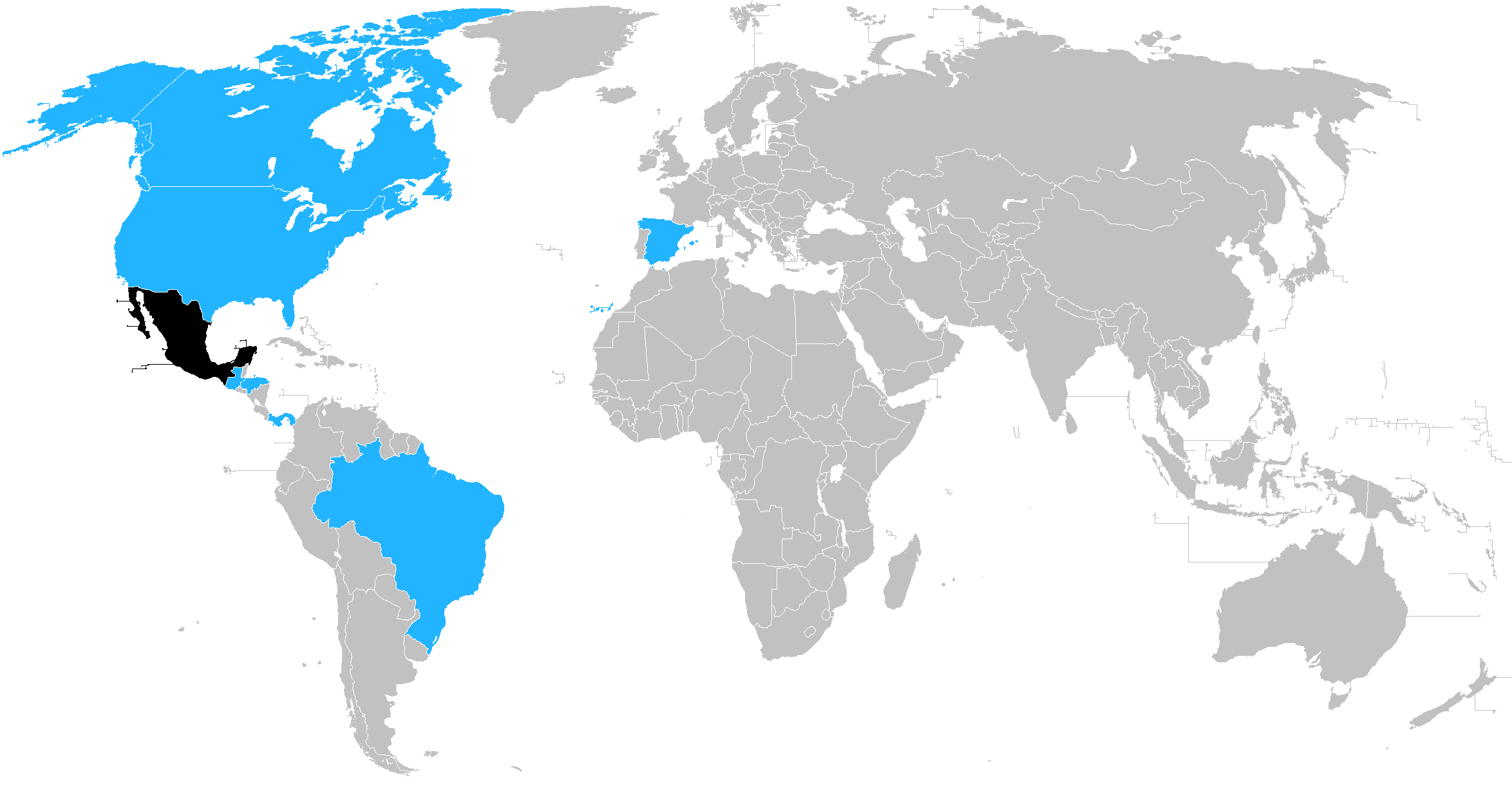
Countries visited by President Sheinbaum during her presidency (in blue), and Mexico (in black).

Her first trip as president was to the G20 summit in Rio de Janeiro, Brazil, in November 2024, and she attended further summits over the following year, among them CELAC in Honduras and the 51st G7 summit in Kananaskis, Canada. In December 2025 she made her first visit to the United States as head of state, for the 2026 FIFA World Cup draw in Washington, D.C., where she held a trilateral meeting with Trump and Canadian prime minister Mark Carney. She made her first trip to Europe as president in April 2026, attending a summit of progressive leaders in Barcelona and meeting Spanish prime minister Pedro Sánchez in a visit widely seen as easing the tensions with Spain inherited from the López Obrador years.

=== United States ===
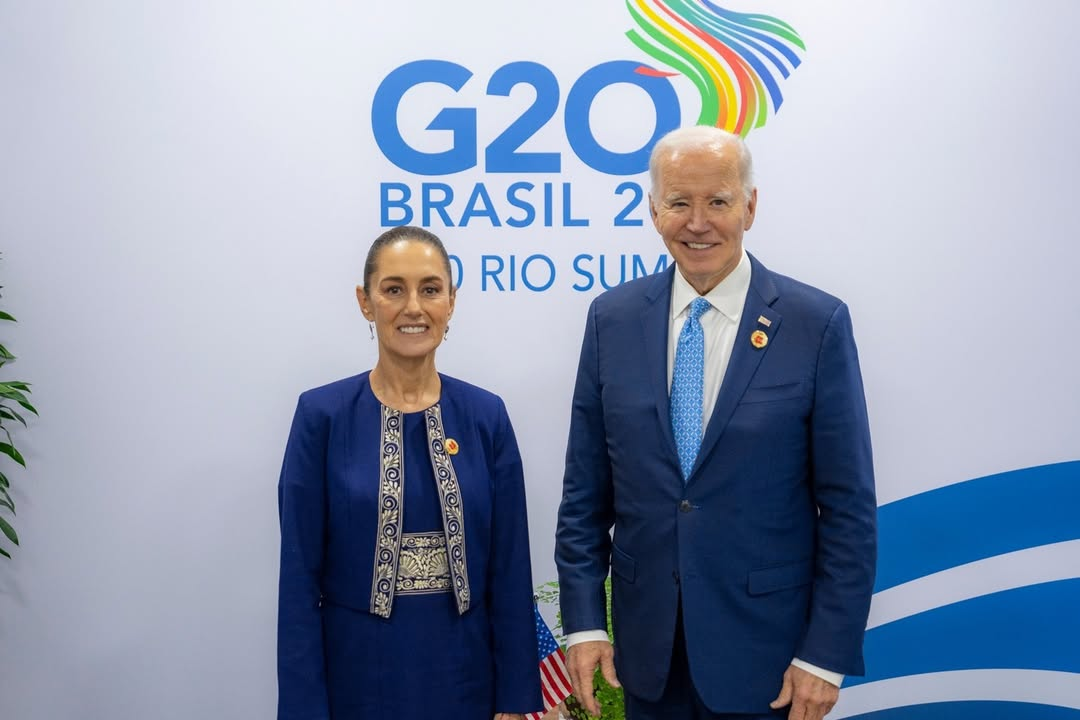
Sheinbaum and U.S. President Joe Biden at the 2024 G20 Rio de Janeiro summit in Brazil, 19 November 2024

==== Trade and tariffs ====
Soon after his inauguration, Trump threatened tariffs of 25% on Mexican goods, opening the trade dispute that defined the early relationship. On 3 February 2025, after a telephone call with Trump, Sheinbaum announced that the tariffs would be paused for one month in exchange for Mexico deploying 10,000 National Guard troops to the northern border to curb the trafficking of fentanyl; in return, the United States agreed to act against the southward smuggling of firearms. Through subsequent negotiations Mexico secured exemptions for goods that complied with the United States–Mexico–Canada Agreement (USMCA), although tariffs of 25% remained on some sectors, including non-compliant vehicles and steel. The two governments and Canada moved toward the agreement's scheduled 2026 joint review.

In line with United States concerns that Chinese goods were reaching North America through Mexico, Sheinbaum's government raised tariffs on imports from countries that lacked free-trade agreements with Mexico. Proposed in September 2025 within the 2026 budget and approved by Congress, the measure imposed duties of up to 50% on around 1,400 categories of goods, chiefly from China, and took effect on 1 January 2026.

A dispute over the 1944 water treaty also drew tariff pressure. When the treaty's five-year delivery cycle closed in October 2025 with Mexico having sent less than half of the water owed from the Rio Grande basin, the Sheinbaum government attributed the shortfall to severe drought and denied breaching the treaty. In December 2025, Trump imposed an additional 5% tariff over the matter, after which the two governments agreed that Mexico would release a further 202,000 acre-feet of water and negotiate a longer-term distribution plan.

==== Security and sovereignty ====
On 20 January 2025, Trump signed an executive order beginning the process to designate drug cartels as foreign terrorist organizations, and on 20 February 2025 the United States Department of State formally designated six Mexican cartels, among them the Sinaloa Cartel and the Jalisco New Generation Cartel. Sheinbaum's government condemned the designation as a possible pretext for unilateral intervention and warned against any violation of Mexican sovereignty. When Trump offered to send United States troops into Mexico to combat the cartels, Sheinbaum publicly refused, saying that the national territory was inviolable and that "sovereignty is not for sale". Trump at times accused Mexican authorities of tolerating the cartels, a charge Sheinbaum rejected.

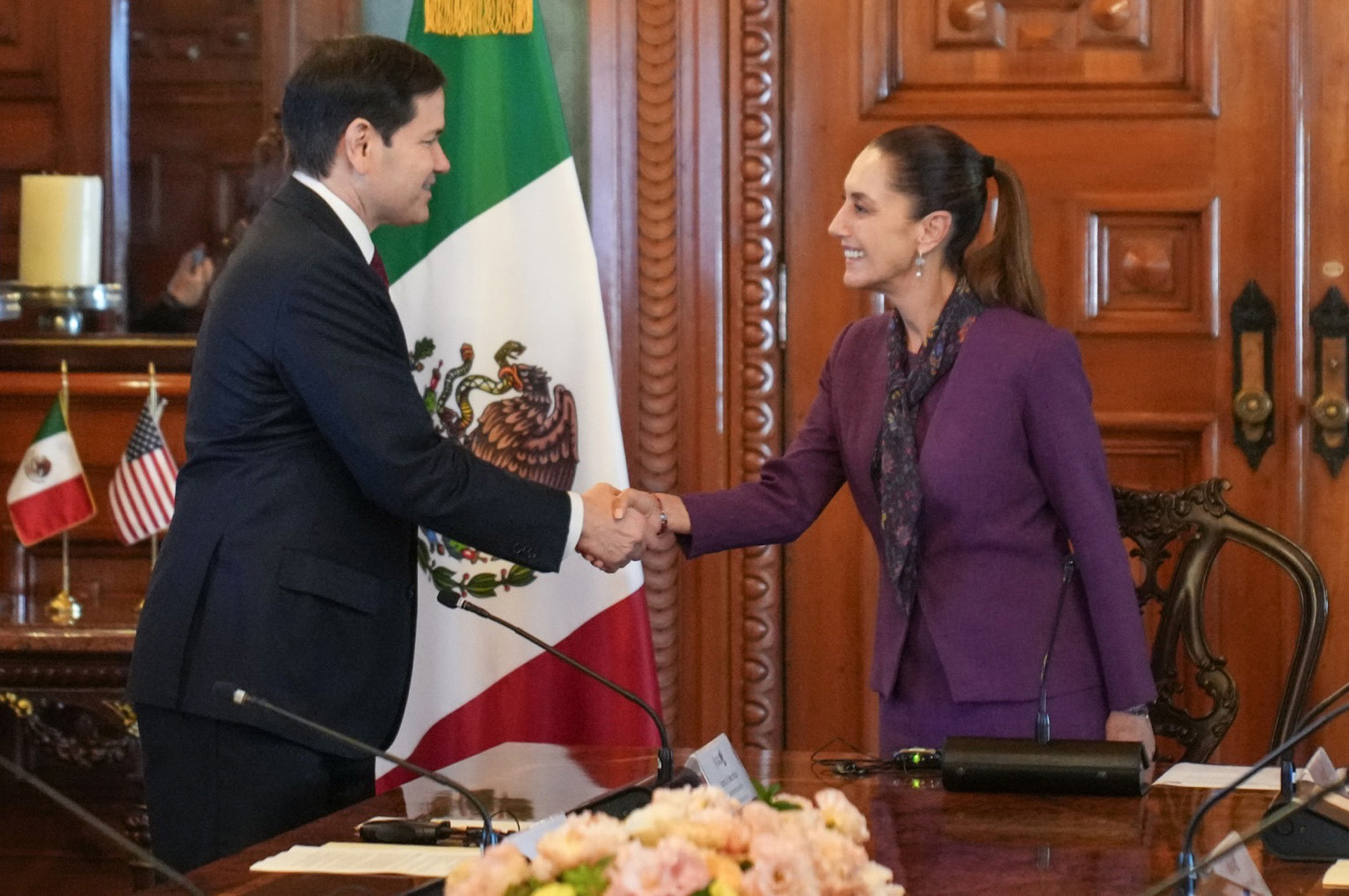
President Claudia Sheinbaum at National Palace with Marco Rubio, United States Secretary of State

Alongside this resistance, Sheinbaum's administration expanded operational cooperation. On 27 February 2025, as officials negotiated in Washington against the tariff deadline, Mexico transferred 29 imprisoned cartel figures to the United States, among them Rafael Caro Quintero, who was wanted over the 1985 killing of the DEA agent Kiki Camarena. Analysts described it as the largest single transfer of its kind in the history of relations between the two countries. In a second transfer on 12 August 2025, Mexico sent 26 more cartel figures to the United States, among them Abigael González Valencia of the CJNG-aligned Los Cuinis; Sheinbaum called it a sovereign decision taken for Mexico's security. Cooperation extended to intelligence sharing: Sheinbaum said United States surveillance drones flew over Mexican territory at Mexico's request and that the flights were legal, and on 22 February 2026 the Mexican armed forces, with United States intelligence support, killed the CJNG leader Nemesio Oseguera Cervantes, known as "El Mencho", in an operation in Tapalpa, Jalisco.

Sheinbaum meeting with U.S. Secretary of Homeland Security Markwayne Mullin in Mexico City, May 21, 2026

In late April 2026, the United States Department of Justice indicted several Mexican officials, including the governor of Sinaloa, Rubén Rocha Moya, accusing them of accepting bribes and shielding the Sinaloa Cartel. Sheinbaum rejected the charges as political interference in Mexico's internal affairs, demanded "irrefutable proof", and said she would not surrender the accused politicians without clear evidence. She linked the heightened tensions to an incident in April 2026 in which United States officials died while assisting a Mexican security operation in Chihuahua, over which she had demanded an explanation from Washington.

==== Migration ====
In 2024, Mexican authorities recorded more than 1.2 million cases of undocumented migration. Most of these migrants came from Latin America and the Caribbean, primarily Venezuela, Guatemala, Honduras, Ecuador, Haiti, and Colombia. In response to the rising numbers and U.S. pressure, Mexico tightened migration controls and deployed 10,000 additional National Guard troops to its borders in February 2025. The number of undocumented migrants registered by Mexican authorities fell by 87% in 2025 compared with 2024.

Mexico cooperated with the Trump administration's intensified enforcement at the border, including by receiving migrants of other nationalities returned from the United States, and crossings fell sharply during 2025. Sheinbaum adopted a firmer public stance over time, criticising the United States after the deaths of Mexican nationals held in immigration custody.

=== Latin America and the Caribbean ===
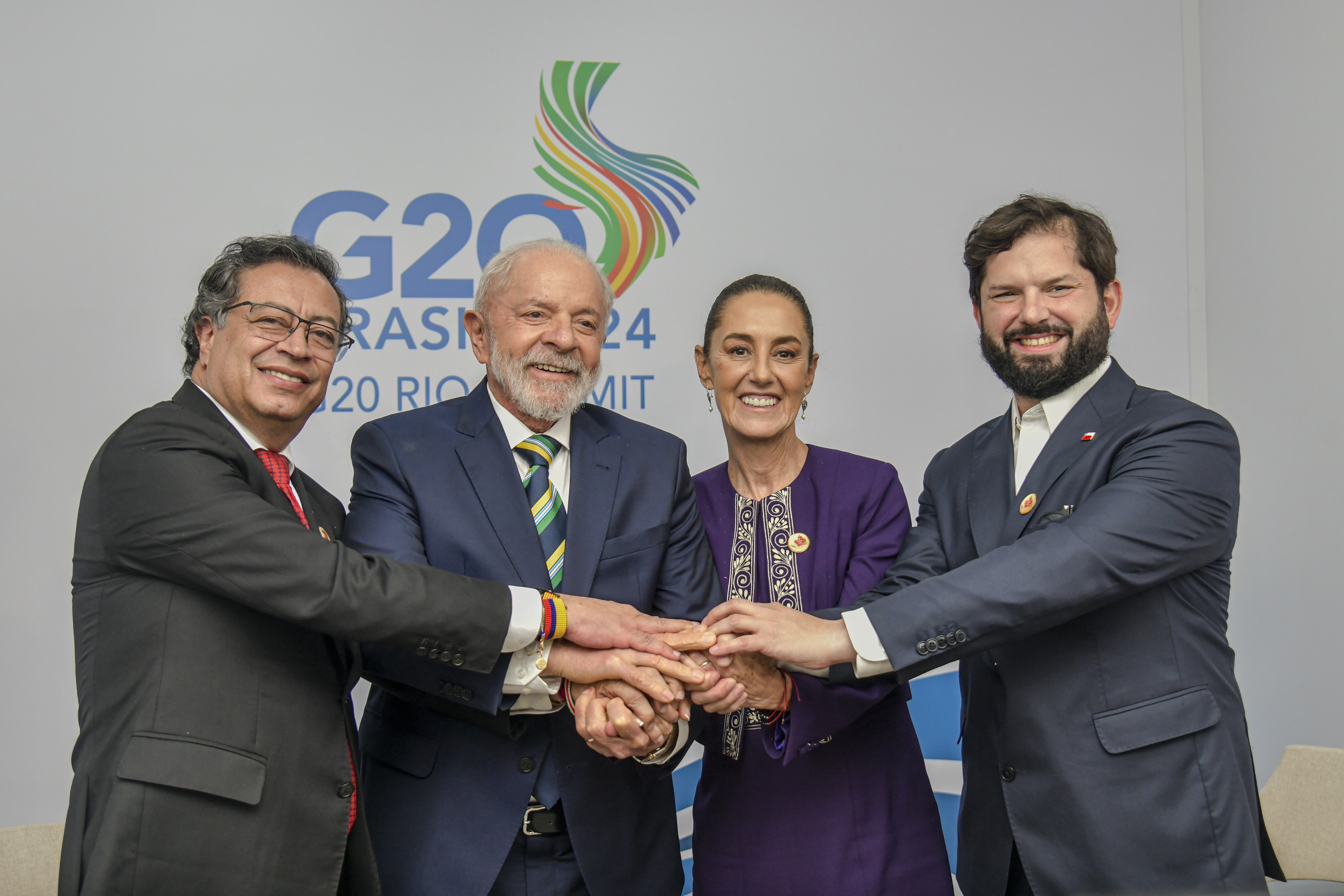
Sheinbaum with Colombian President Gustavo Petro, Brazilian President Luiz Inácio Lula da Silva and Chilean President Gabriel Boric in November 2024

Sheinbaum increased Mexico's engagement with the region. At the summit of the Community of Latin American and Caribbean States (CELAC) held in Tegucigalpa, Honduras, on 9 April 2025, she called for greater regional economic integration in response to United States tariffs, and the member states adopted the Tegucigalpa Declaration.

Her government maintained close ties with Cuba. Pemex supplied crude oil to the island, averaging about 19,200 barrels per day between January and September 2025 as Venezuelan deliveries declined, before the rate fell and shipments were suspended in January 2026 after Trump threatened tariffs on any country that sent oil to Cuba. Mexico then turned to humanitarian assistance, sending thousands of tonnes of food, medicine and solar equipment, some carried by naval vessels, from February 2026, and Sheinbaum said the aid would continue despite United States sanctions. She also upheld an agreement under which Cuban doctors practised in Mexico, resisting United States pressure to end it and calling it a bilateral arrangement that benefited Mexico.

Relations with Ecuador remained severed after the April 2024 raid on the Mexican embassy in Quito, which had occurred under Sheinbaum's predecessor; she said Mexico would not restore them while Daniel Noboa was president. Relations with Peru broke down in November 2025 after Mexico granted asylum to the former Peruvian prime minister Betssy Chávez, who had taken refuge in the Mexican embassy in Lima while under investigation over the 2022 Peruvian self-coup attempt. Peru severed ties, and on 6 November 2025 its Congress declared Sheinbaum persona non grata; Mexico rejected the move, saying it had granted asylum in accordance with international law.

=== Europe ===
Relations with Spain remained strained over Mexico's request, first made under López Obrador, for an apology for abuses committed during the Spanish conquest. Sheinbaum did not invite King Felipe VI to her inauguration in October 2024, though she maintained that there was no diplomatic crisis between the two countries.

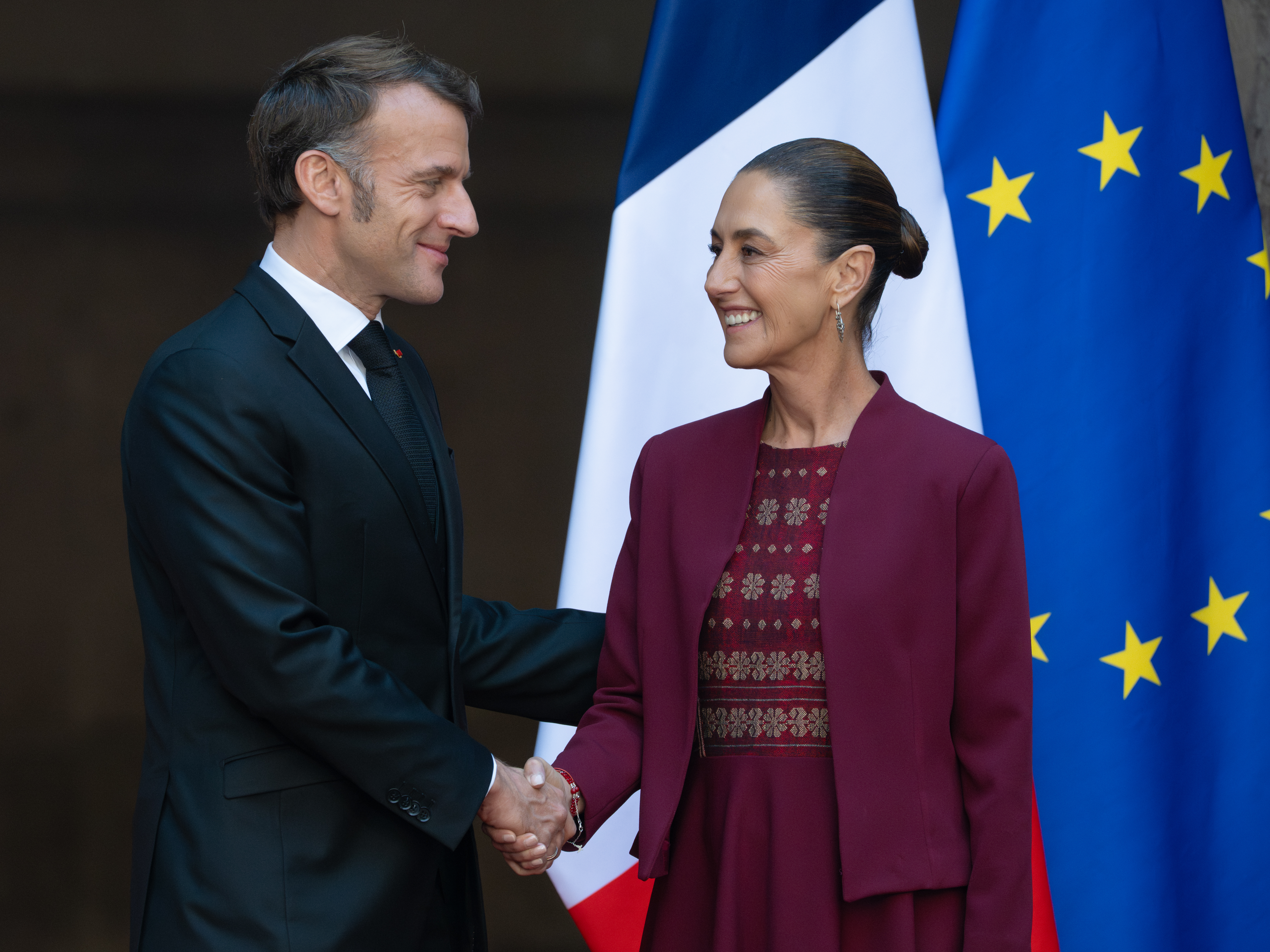
Sheinbaum hosting French President Emmanuel Macron at the National Palace in Mexico City in November 2025.

President Emmanuel Macron made an official visit to Mexico on 7 November 2025, the first by a European head of state since Sheinbaum took office; the two governments relaunched the Franco-Mexican Strategic Council and held a bilateral economic forum, and Mexico pressed for the return of pre-Hispanic codices held in French collections.

On 22 May 2026, Mexico and the European Union signed a modernised version of their Global Agreement, where Sheinbaum was joined by European Commission president Ursula von der Leyen and European Council president António Costa. The agreement updated a pact in force since 2000 and removed most tariffs on agricultural trade.

=== Middle East ===
Sheinbaum supported a two-state settlement of the Israeli–Palestinian conflict. She said a Palestinian state should be recognised alongside Israel, calling it Mexico's long-standing position. She condemned the Gaza war saying that war "will never lead to a good outcome", and in March 2025 received Nadya Rasheed as the Palestinian ambassador to Mexico at the National Palace. While Sheinbaum condemned attacks on civilian populations—including the October 7 attacks, subsequent violence in Gaza, and other acts of aggression in the region—she initially refrained from characterizing Israel's military actions in Gaza as genocide. Her stance changed on 22 September, when she referred to Israel's actions in Gaza as a "genocide" during a press conference.

=== Multilateral organizations ===
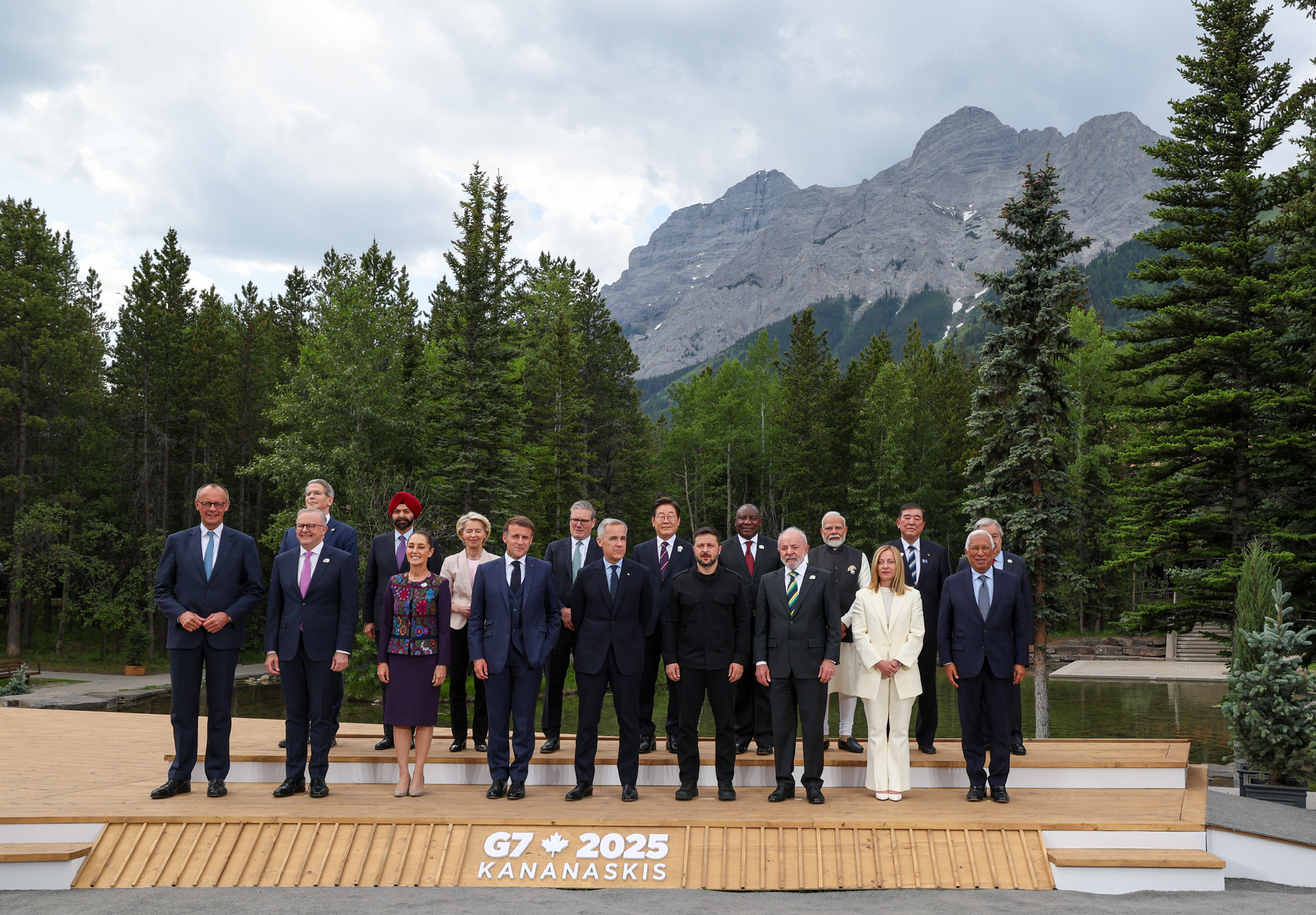
Sheinbaum was invited to attend the 51st G7 Summit in Kananaskis, Canada.

At the 2024 G20 Rio de Janeiro summit in November 2024, Sheinbaum proposed that governments devote 1% of global military spending, about 24 billion dollars a year, to what she called the largest reforestation programme in history, arguing that the diversion would help address poverty, migration and climate change. She also renewed Mexico's call to reform the United Nations Security Council to add seats for Africa, Latin America and the Caribbean, and small island states.

Sheinbaum repeatedly opposed United States military action as contrary to international law. After the United States strikes on Iranian nuclear sites in June 2025, she said Mexico would "always be a factor for peace", and called for a United Nations-led peace process. From September 2025 she objected to a United States campaign of strikes on suspected drug-trafficking boats in international waters. She said in October that Mexico did "not agree with these attacks" and warned that Mexican nationals could be aboard, and in November 2025 the two governments agreed that the Mexican Navy would intercept such vessels near Mexico's coasts to forestall further strikes. On 3 January 2026, she condemned a United States military operation in Venezuela, invoking Article 2 of the Charter of the United Nations and describing Latin America and the Caribbean as a "zone of peace".

== Security incidents ==
On 4 November 2025, Sheinbaum was groped while greeting members of the public on a downtown Mexico City street. The assailant was detained shortly afterward and later arrested. In response, Sheinbaum announced that she would press charges, stating that her decision was intended to set a precedent and encourage women in Mexico to report sexual violence.

== Controversies ==
=== Discovery of a training camp ===
Within Rancho Izaguirre, located in Teuchitlán, Jalisco, a possible extermination camp was discovered on 5 March 2025 by a group of volunteers searching for missing persons.

=== Assassination of Carlos Manzo ===
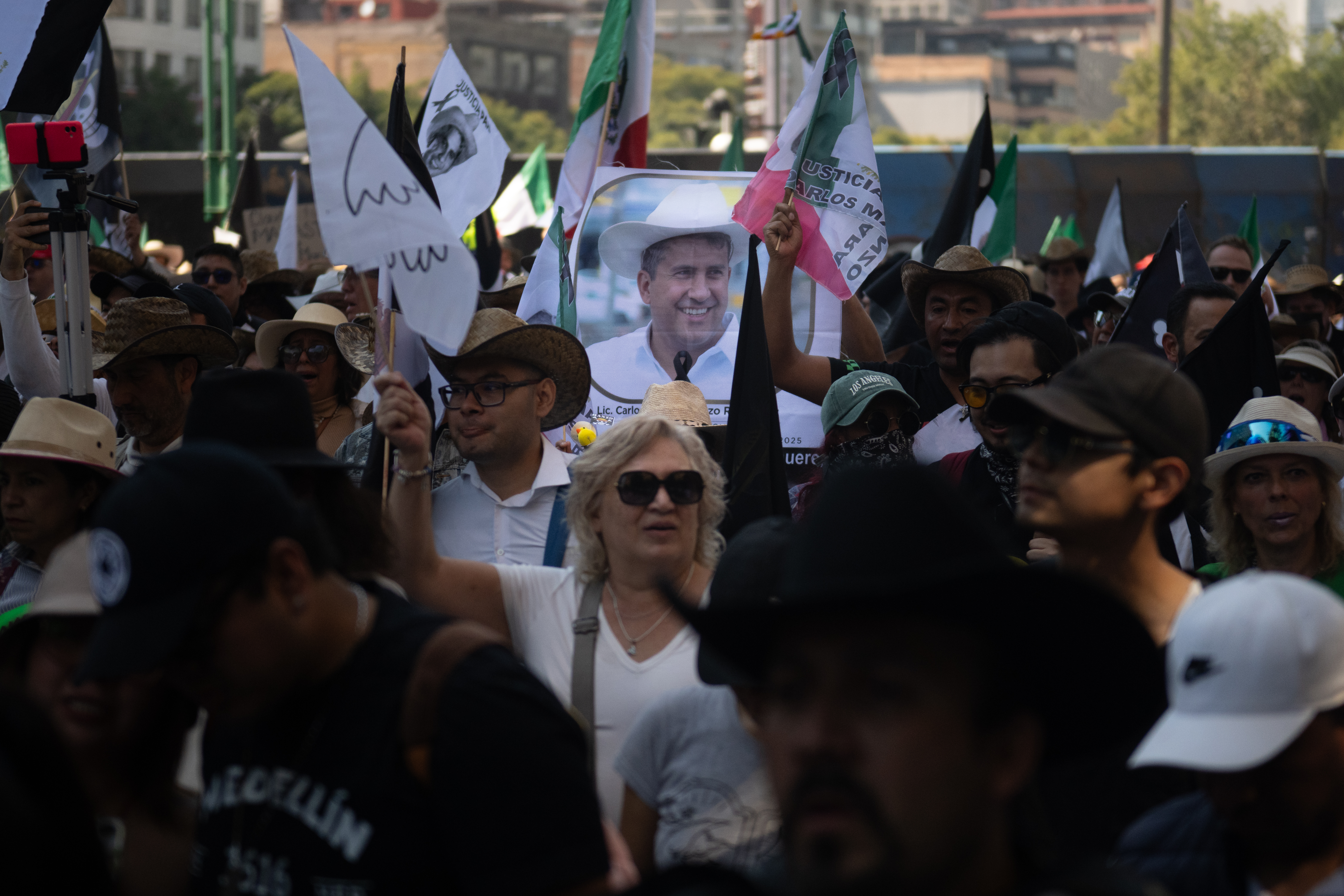
Protests over the assassination of Carlos Manzo amid Generation Z demonstrations.

On 1 November 2025, Carlos Manzo, the municipal president of Uruapan, Michoacán, was assassinated during Day of the Dead festivities by an alleged member of a criminal group. After his death, it was reported in the media that Manzo had requested support from Sheinbaum to combat organized crime on at least ten occasions, which caused public outrage and several demonstrations.

== See also ==
- List of politicians killed during the presidency of Claudia Sheinbaum
