= Cabinet of Mexico =

Executive branch of the Mexican government

The Cabinet of Mexico is the Executive Cabinet (Spanish: Gabinete Legal) and is a part of the executive branch of the Mexican government. It consists of nineteen Secretaries of State and the Legal Counsel of the Federal Executive.

In addition to the legal Executive Cabinet there are other Cabinet-level administration offices that report directly to the President of the Republic (Gabinete Ampliado). Officials from the legal and extended Cabinet (Gabinete Legal y Ampliado) are subordinate to the President.

== Constitutional and legal basis ==
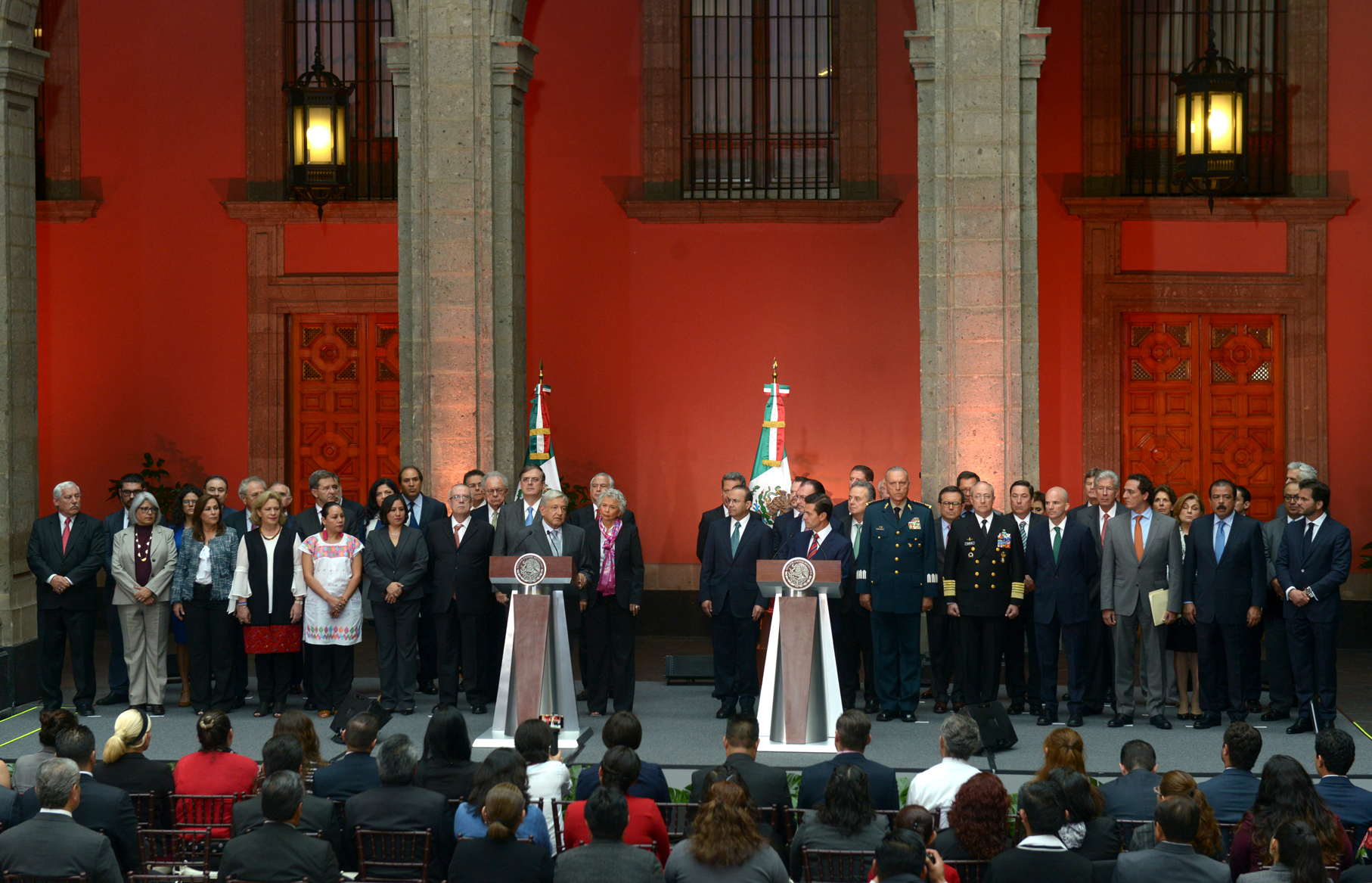
Cabinet Officers of President-elect Andrés Manuel López Obrador (left) and of President Enrique Peña Nieto, August 2018.

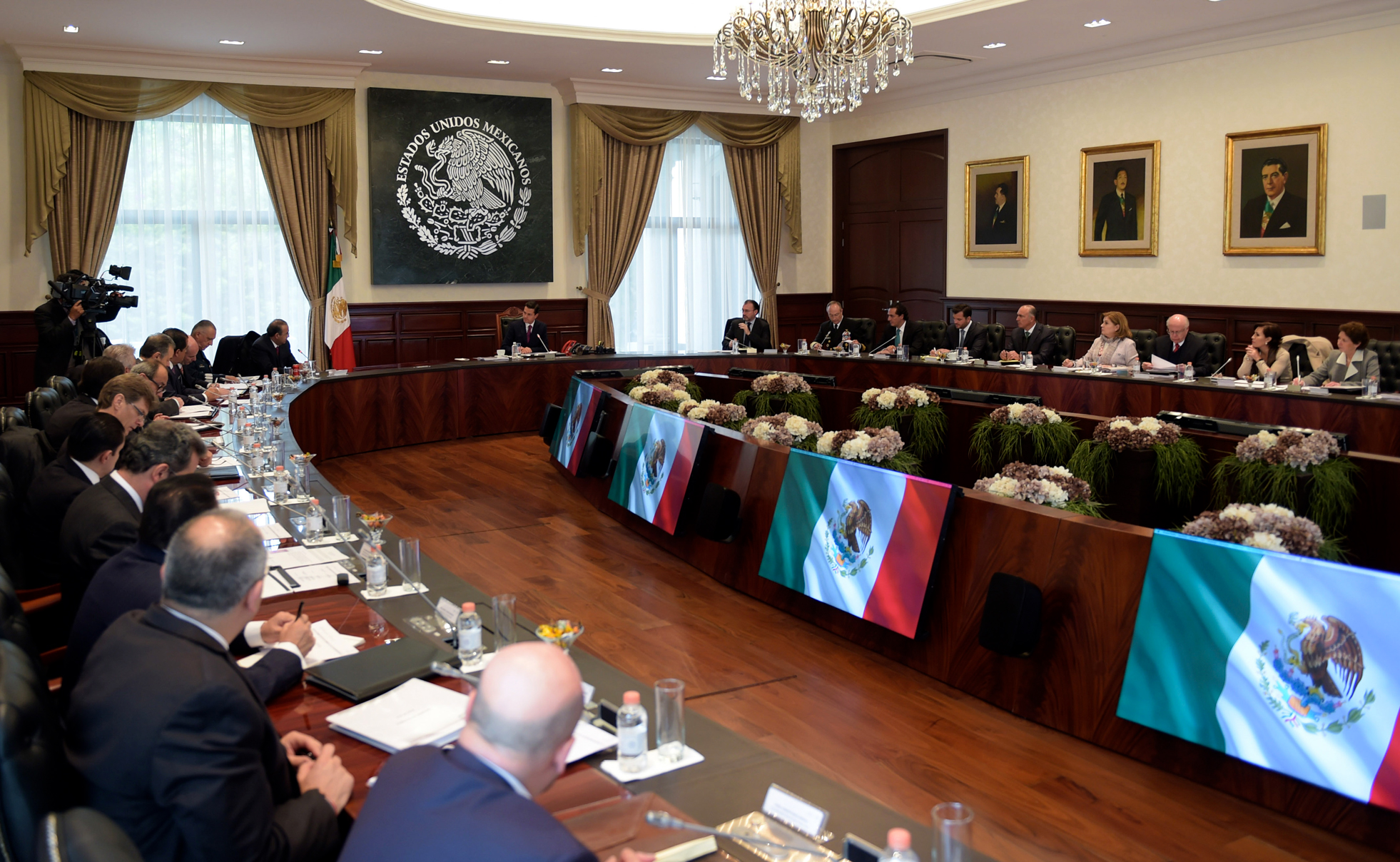
Meeting at Los Pinos of the Cabinet of President Enrique Peña Nieto, January 2018.

The term "Cabinet" does not appear in the Constitution, where reference is made only to the Secretaries of State. Article 89 of the Constitution provides that the President of Mexico can appoint and remove Secretaries of State.

The Executive Cabinet does not play a collective legislative or executive role (as do the Cabinets in parliamentary systems). The main interaction that Cabinet members have with the legislative branch are regular testimonials before Congressional committees to justify their actions, and coordinate executive and legislative policy in their respective fields of jurisdiction.

== Secretary selection process ==
Cabinet members are freely appointed by the President, except for the Secretary of the Treasury and the Secretary of Foreign Affairs, whose appointments must be approved by the Chamber of Deputies and the Senate respectively.

Cabinet Secretaries are often selected from past and current governors, senators, and other political office holders. Private citizens such as businessmen or former military officials are also common Cabinet choices.

It is not rare for a Secretary to be moved from one Secretariat to another. For example, former Secretary of Energy Fernando Canales Clariond had previously served as Secretary of Economy and former Secretary of Education Josefina Vázquez Mota had previously served as Secretary of Social Development.

== Cabinet and Cabinet-level officials ==
=== Cabinet ===
Department	Title	Incumbent	Image	In Office since
Secretariat of the Interior (Spanish: Secretaría de Gobernación)	Secretary of the Interior (Spanish: Secretaria de Gobernación)	Rosa Icela Rodríguez (b. 1959)		October 1, 2024
Secretariat of Foreign Affairs (Spanish: Secretaría de Relaciones Exteriores)	Secretary of Foreign Affairs (Spanish: Secretario de Relaciones Exteriores)	Roberto Velasco Álvarez (b. 1987)		April 1, 2026
Secretariat of Finance and Public Credit (Spanish: Secretaría de Hacienda y Crédito Público)	Secretary of Finance (Spanish: Secretario de Hacienda)	Edgar Amador Zamora (b. 1967)		March 8, 2025
Secretariat of National Defense (Spanish: Secretaría de la Defensa Nacional)	Secretary of Defense (Spanish: Secretario de Defensa)	Ricardo Trevilla Trejo (b. 1961)		October 1, 2024
Secretariat of the Navy (Spanish: Secretaría de Marina)	Secretary of Navy (Spanish: Secretario de Marina)	Raymundo Morales Ángeles (b. 1966)		October 1, 2024
Secretariat of Security and Citizen Protection (Spanish: Secretaría de Seguridad y Protección Ciudadana)	Secretary of Security (Spanish: Secretario de Seguridad)	Omar García Harfuch (b. 1982)		October 1, 2024
Secretariat of Welfare (Spanish: Secretaría de Bienestar)	Secretary of Welfare (Spanish: Secretaria de Bienestar)	Leticia Ramírez Amaya (b. 1961)		April 29, 2026
Secretariat of Environment and Natural Resources (Spanish: Secretaría de Medio Ambiente y Recursos Naturales)	Secretary of Environment (Spanish: Secretaria de Medio Ambiente)	Alicia Bárcena (b. 1952)		October 1, 2024
Secretariat of Energy (Spanish: Secretaría de Energía)	Secretary of Energy (Spanish: Secretaria de Energía)	Luz Elena González Escobar (b. 1974)		October 1, 2024
Secretariat of Economy (Spanish: Secretaría de Economia)	Secretary of Economy (Spanish: Secretario de Economía)	Marcelo Ebrard (b. 1959)		October 1, 2024
Secretariat of Agriculture and Rural Development (Spanish: Secretaría de Agricultura y Desarrollo Rural)	Secretary of Agriculture (Spanish: Secretaria de Agricultura)	Columba López Gutiérrez (b. 1974)		May 1, 2026
Secretariat of Infrastructure, Communications and Transportation (Spanish: Secretaría de Infraestructura, Comunicaciones y Transportes)	Secretary of Infrastructure (Spanish: Secretario de Infraestructura)	Jesús Antonio Esteva Medina (b. 1965)		October 1, 2024
Secretariat of Anticorruption and Good Governance (Spanish: Secretaría Anticorrupción y Buen Gobierno)	Anti-corruption and Good Governance Secretariat (Spanish: Secretaria Anticorrupción y Buen Gobierno)	Raquel Buenrostro Sánchez (b. 1970)		October 1, 2024
Secretariat of Public Education (Spanish: Secretaría de Educación Pública)	Secretary of Education (Spanish: Secretario de Educación)	Mario Delgado Carrillo (b. 1972)		October 1, 2024
Secretariat of Health (Spanish: Secretaría de Salud)	Secretary of Health (Spanish: Secretario de Salud)	David Kershenobich Stalnikowitz (b. 1942)		October 1, 2024
Secretariat of Labor and Social Welfare (Spanish: Secretaría del Trabajo y Previsión Social)	Secretary of Labor (Spanish: Secretario del Trabajo)	Marath Baruch Bolaños López (b. 1986)		June 20, 2023
Secretariat of Agrarian, Land, and Urban Development (Spanish: Secretaría de Desarrollo Agrario, Territorial y Urbano)	Secretary of Agrarian, Land, and Urban Development (Spanish: Secretaria de Desarrollo Agrario, Territorial y Urbano)	Edna Elena Vega Rangel (b. 1962)		October 1, 2024
Secretariat of Culture (Spanish: Secretaría de Cultura)	Secretary of Culture (Spanish: Secretaria de Cultura)	Claudia Curiel de Icaza (b. 1979)		October 1, 2024
Secretariat of Tourism (Spanish: Secretaría de Turismo)	Secretary of Tourism (Spanish: Secretaria de Turismo)	Josefina Rodríguez Zamora (b. 1989)		October 1, 2024
Secretariat of Science, Humanities, Technology and Innovation (Spanish: Secretaría de Ciencia, Humanidades, Tecnología e Innovación)	Secretary of Science, Humanities, Technology and Innovation (Spanish: Secretaria de Ciencia, Humanidades, Tecnología e Innovación)	Rosaura Ruiz Gutiérrez (b. 1950)		October 1, 2024
Secretariat of Women (Spanish: Secretaría de las Mujeres)	Secretary of Women (Spanish: Secretaria de las Mujeres)	Laura Itzel Castillo (b. 1957)		September 3, 2026
Legal Counsel of the Federal Executive (Spanish: Consejería Jurídica del Ejecutivo Federal)	Legal Advisor (Spanish: Consejera Jurídica)	Luisa Alcalde (b. 1987)		May 4, 2026
Digital Transformation and Telecommunications Agency (Spanish: Agencia de Transformación Digital y Telecomunicaciones)	Director of Digital Transformation and Telecommunications (Spanish: Director de la Agencia de Transformación Digital y Telecomunicaciones)	José Antonio Peña Merino (b. 1974)		January 1, 2025

=== Cabinet-level administration offices ===
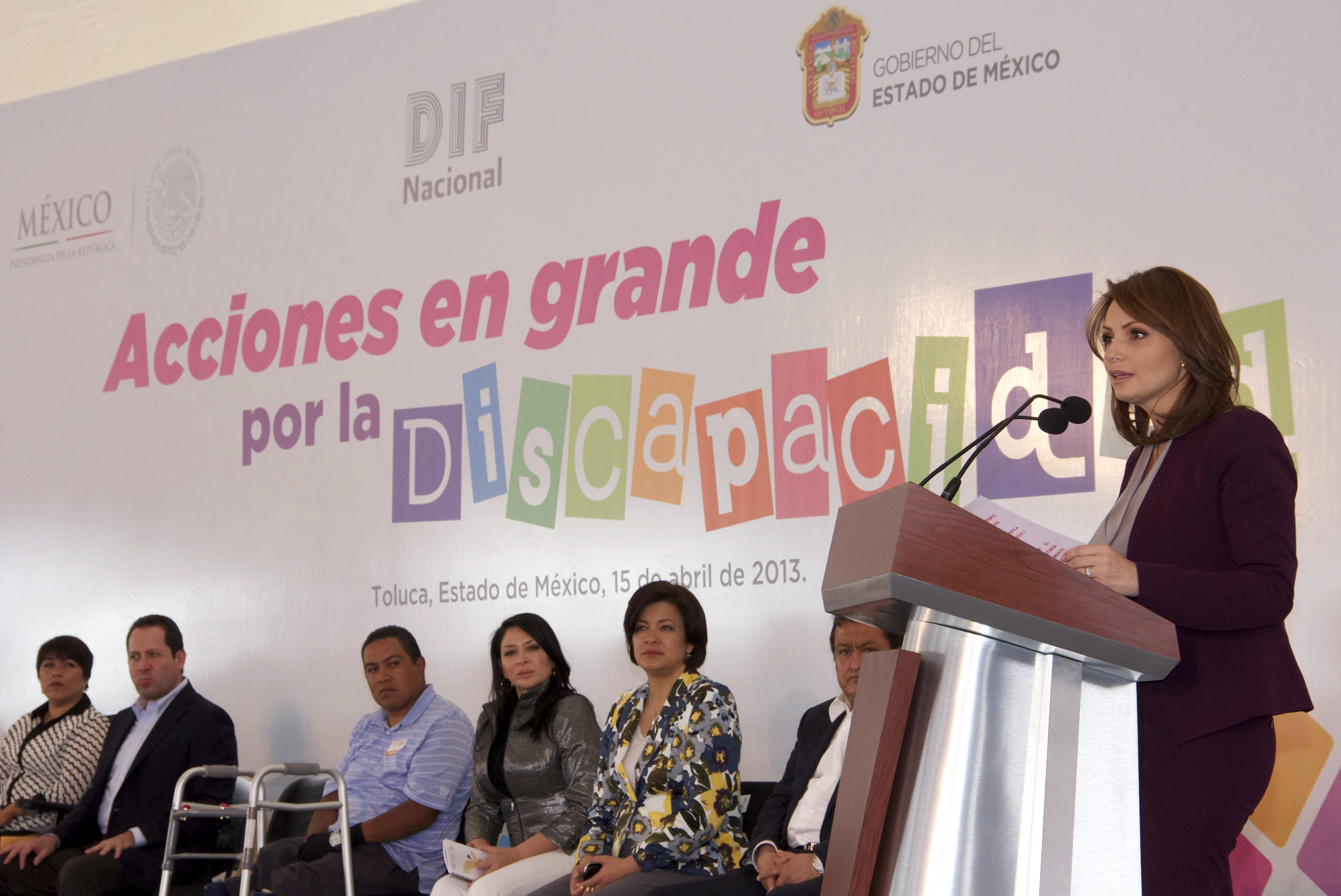
First Lady Angélica Rivera (2012–2018) speaking at a DIF event for disability benefits.

Some positions are not part of the legal Executive Cabinet, but have cabinet-level rank therefore their incumbents are considered members of the extended cabinet (Gabinete ampliado).

The National DIF has traditionally been headed by the First Lady or Gentleman of Mexico. However, the position may be filled by another if the president does not have a spouse (as happened during the early Fox presidency) or the presidential spouse refuses the position, such as with Beatriz Gutiérrez Müller (2018–2024).

Some of the cabinet-level administration offices are:

Department	Title	Incumbent	Image	in Office since
National System for Integral Family Development (Spanish: Desarrollo Integral de la Familia)	Director of National System for Integral Family Development (Spanish: Director del Desarrollo Integral de la Familia)	María del Rocío García Pérez		October 1, 2024
National Commission of Sport (Spanish: CONADE)	President of CONADE (Spanish: Presidente del CONADE)	Rommel Pacheco		October 1, 2024
Chief of Staff (Spanish: Presidencia de la Republica)	Chief of Staff (Spanish: Jefe de la Presidencia)	Lázaro Cárdenas Batel		October 1, 2024
National Institute of Indigenous Peoples (Spanish: Instituto Nacional de los Pueblos Indígenas)	General Director of the National Institute of Indigenous Peoples (Spanish: Director General del Instituto Nacional de los Pueblos Indígenas.)	Adelfo Regino Montes		December 1, 2018
