= Karen Castrejón Trujillo =

Mexican politician

Leader of the Ecologist Green Party of Mexico
- Incumbent
- Assumed office 26 November 2020
- Preceded by: Carlos Alberto Puente Salas

Personal details
- Born: 1 April 1980 (age 46) Acapulco, Guerrero, Mexico
- Party: Ecologist Green Party of Mexico

Karen Castrejón Trujillo (born 1 April 1980) is a Mexican lawyer and politician, currently serving as President of the Ecologist Green Party of Mexico since November 2020. She has also served as Secretary of Environment and Natural Resources under the administration of Héctor Astudillo Flores and local deputy to the Congress of Guerrero from 2012 to 2015 for the Green Ecologist Party of Mexico.

She studied law at the Autonomous University of Guerrero, from which she graduated in 2003, and later obtained a diploma in Environmental Law and Management from the Faculty of Sciences of the National Autonomous University of Mexico.

Castrejón Trujillo's name appeared on the ballot in the 2024 Senate election in Mexico City as the substitute for Ernestina Godoy on the Sigamos Haciendo Historia coalition's two-name formula. Following Godoy's appointment to Claudia Sheinbaum's cabinet, Castrejón assumed her place in the Senate for the 66th and 67th Congresses (1 September 2024 to 31 August 2030).
