= Juan de Dios Castro Lozano =

Mexican lawyer and politician (1942–2020)

President of the Chamber of Deputies
- In office 1 September 2003 – 31 August 2004
- Preceded by: Armando Salinas Torre
- Succeeded by: Manlio Fabio Beltrones

Personal details
- Born: 25 March 1942 Torreón, Coahuila, Mexico
- Died: 24 November 2020 (aged 78) Lerdo, Durango, Mexico
- Party: PAN
- Occupation: Lawyer and politician

Juan de Dios Castro Lozano (25 March 1942 – 24 November 2020) was a Mexican lawyer and politician affiliated with the National Action Party.

== Biography ==
He served as Deputy of the LI, LIII, and LV Legislatures of the Mexican Congress as a plurinominal representative and as Senator of the LVI and LVII Legislatures.

He also was President of the Chamber of Deputies from 2003 to 2004 and served two terms (2000–2003 and 2005–2006) as Legal Counsel of the Federal Executive.

Castro Lozano died on 24 November 2020, at age 78, from COVID-19 in Lerdo, Durango.
