= Legal Counsel of the Federal Executive =

- Consejería Jurídica del Ejecutivo Federal
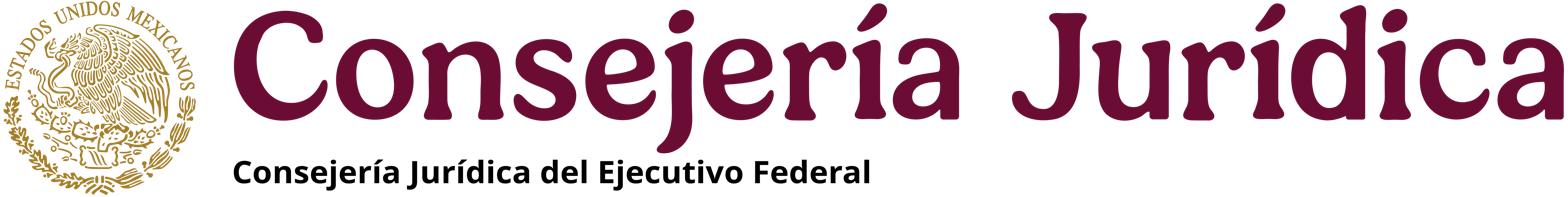

Agency overview
- Formed: 15 May 1996; 30 years ago
- Jurisdiction: Federal Government of Mexico
- Website: http://www.cjef.gob.mx

Footnotes
- flag

The Legal Counsel of the Federal Executive (Consejero Jurídico del Ejecutivo Federal, CJEF) is a government official who, alongside the 19 secretaries of state, is a member of the cabinet of the President of Mexico. The purpose of the office of the legal counsel (Consejería Jurídica del Ejecutivo Federal) is to review and validate legal instruments that are submitted to the president for consideration, such as decrees, agreements, legislative bills or constitutional reforms. Its other tasks include drafting or assisting in the drafting of bills that are to be presented to the Congress of the Union. It also represents the president in unconstitutionality actions or constitutional controversies as provided for in the Constitution and represents him or her in all lawsuits in which he or she is a party.

== History ==
The office of the Legal Counsel of the Federal Executive was created on 15 May 1996 during the administration of Ernesto Zedillo. By means of constitutional amendments enacted on 30 December 2015, article 26 of the Organic Law of the Federal Public Administration was revised to raise the office of the Legal Counsel to cabinet status.

== Functions ==
The functions of the CJEF are set out in articles 43, 43-bis and 43-ter of the Organic Law of the Federal Public Administration. They include:

- To support the president in such legal matters as he or she may request.
- To consider and give its opinion on any bill sent by the president to Congress.
- To receive bills and initiatives that the secretariats of state seek to submit to Congress, at least one month in advance.
- To head the federal government's Legal Studies Commission, which is made up of representatives of the legal areas of each agency of the federal public administration.

== List of Legal Counsels of the Federal Executive ==
No.	Portrait	Name	Term of office	Duration	Political Party	President
1	—N/a	Germán Aguirre Fernández	15 May 1996 – 30 November 2000	4 years, 199 days	Independent	Ernesto Zedillo (1994–2000)
2	—N/a	Juan de Dios Castro Lozano; 1st term	1 December 2000 – 20 March 2003	2 years, 109 days	National Action Party	Vicente Fox (2000–2006)
3		María Teresa Herrera Tello	3 April 2003 – 11 November 2004	1 year, 222 days	Independent	Vicente Fox (2000–2006)
4	—N/a	Daniel Francisco Cabeza de Vaca; 1st term	11 November 2004 – 27 April 2005	167 days	National Action Party	Vicente Fox (2000–2006)
5	—N/a	Juan de Dios Castro Lozano; 2nd term	12 November 2005 – 30 November 2006	1 year, 18 days	National Action Party	Vicente Fox (2000–2006)
6	—N/a	Daniel Francisco Cabeza de Vaca; 2nd term	1 December 2006 – 28 January 2008	1 year, 58 days	National Action Party	Felipe Calderón (2006–2012)
7	—N/a	Miguel Alessio Robles Landa	28 January 2008 – 30 November 2012	4 years, 307 days	Independent	Felipe Calderón (2006–2012)
8		Humberto Castillejos Cervantes	1 December 2012 – 9 June 2017	4 years, 190 days	Ecologist Green Party of Mexico	Enrique Peña Nieto (2012–2018)
9		Misha Leonel Granados	9 June 2017 – 30 November 2018	1 year, 174 days	Independent	Enrique Peña Nieto (2012–2018)
10		Julio Scherer Ibarra	1 December 2018 – 2 September 2021	2 years, 275 days	Independent	Andrés Manuel López Obrador (2018–2024)
11	—N/a	María Estela Ríos González	2 September 2021 – 30 September 2024	3 years, 28 days	Independent	Andrés Manuel López Obrador (2018–2024)
12		Ernestina Godoy Ramos	1 October 2024 – 27 November 2025	1 year, 57 days	National Regeneration Movement	Claudia Sheinbaum (2024–present)
13		Esthela Damián Peralta	17 December 2025 – 30 April 2026	134 days	National Regeneration Movement	Claudia Sheinbaum (2024–present)
14		Luisa María Alcalde Luján	4 May 2026 – present	194 days	National Regeneration Movement	Claudia Sheinbaum (2024–present)
