= Ernestina Godoy =

Mexican lawyer and civil servant (born 1954)

Ernestina Godoy Ramos
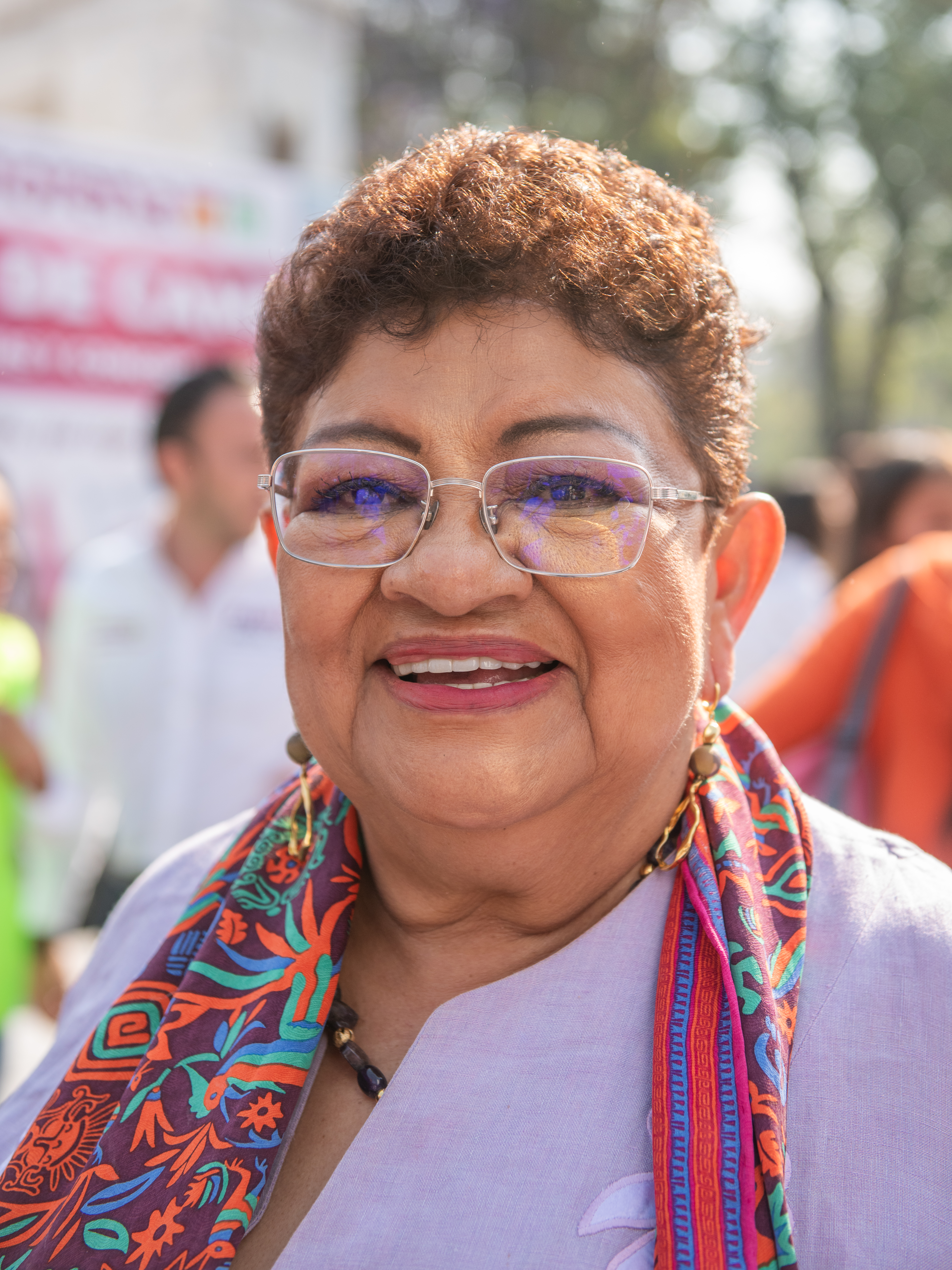
- Godoy Ramos in 2024

Attorney General of Mexico
- Incumbent
- Assumed office 27 November 2025 (Note: Acting: 27 November – 3 December 2025)
- Preceded by: Alejandro Gertz Manero

Legal Counsel of the Federal Executive
- In office 1 October 2024 – 27 November 2025
- President: Claudia Sheinbaum
- Preceded by: María Estela Ríos González
- Succeeded by: Esthela Damián Peralta

Attorney General of Mexico City
- In office 10 January 2020 – 9 January 2024
- Preceded by: Office established
- Succeeded by: Ulises Lara López

Prosecutor General of Mexico City
- In office 5 December 2018 – 10 January 2020
- Head of Government: Claudia Sheinbaum
- Preceded by: Edmundo Garrido Osornio
- Succeeded by: Office abolished
Other offices
Member of the Senate of the Republic
In office 1 September 2024 – 30 September 2024
| Preceded by | Citlalli Hernández |
| Succeeded by | Karen Castrejón Trujillo |
| Constituency | Mexico City |
Member of the Chamber of Deputies
In office 1 September 2015 – 31 August 2018
| Preceded by | Carlos Augusto Morales López |
| Succeeded by | Gerardo Fernández Noroña |
| Constituency | Mexico City's 4th district |
Member of the Legislative Assembly of the Federal District
In office 16 September 2012 – 31 August 2015
| Preceded by | Edith Ruíz Mendicuti |
| Succeeded by | Ana María Rodríguez Ruiz |
| Constituency | 27th district |

Personal details
- Born: 17 January 1954 (age 72) Mexico City, Mexico
- Party: National Regeneration Movement (since 2014)
- Other political affiliations: Party of the Democratic Revolution (2000–2012)
- Education: National Autonomous University of Mexico (LLB)
- Occupation: Lawyer, politician

Ernestina Godoy Ramos (born 17 January 1954) is a Mexican lawyer and civil servant who serves as federal attorney general. She previously served as Attorney General of Mexico City from 2018 to 2024. She was briefly a Senator of the Republic in 2024 before serving as Legal Counsel of the Federal Executive under President Claudia Sheinbaum from October 2024 to November 2025. On 3 December 2025, the Senate elected her to serve as the federal attorney general.

Godoy is a founding member of the National Regeneration Movement (MORENA) and was previously affiliated with the Party of the Democratic Revolution (PRD).

== Career ==
Born on 17 January 1954, Ernestina Godoy Ramos graduated from the Law School of the National Autonomous University of Mexico (UNAM).

She founded various civil society organizations, such as the National Association of Democratic Lawyers, Civic Alliance, and Convergence of Civil Organizations for Democracy. In 1985, she set up an office to give legal assistance to victims of the Mexico City earthquake.

She was a civil society representative in the Commission for Monitoring and Verification of the San Andrés Accords signed by the Zapatista Army of National Liberation and the government.

As a public official, Godoy was Director of Borough Development in Iztapalapa, Coordinator of Legal Affairs in the Social Prosecutor's Office of Mexico City, and General Legal and Legislative Studies Director in the Judicial and Legal Services Council of the Federal District.

In her political career she was a local deputy in the 6th Legislature of the Mexico City Assembly and a federal deputy in the 63rd Legislature of the Congress of the Union (2015–2018), representing the 4th federal electoral district of Mexico City. She was also a local deputy in the 1st Legislature of the Congress of Mexico City, coordinating the MORENA parliamentary group.

On 22 November 2018, mayor Claudia Sheinbaum named Godoy as Mexico City's next Attorney General. She took office on 5 December.

Godoy Ramos sought election as one of Mexico City's senators in the 2024 Senate election, occupying the second place on the Sigamos Haciendo Historia coalition's two-name formula alongside Omar García Harfuch. Despite the coalition's victory in the election, Godoy was later named president-elect Claudia Sheinbaum's choice for Legal Counsel to the Federal Executive; her Senate seat was therefore assumed by her substitute, Karen Castrejón of the Ecologist Green Party of Mexico (PVEM).

== Attorney General of Mexico (2025–present) ==
=== Election ===
Following the resignation of Alejandro Gertz Manero as Attorney General, he appointed Godoy to lead the Specialized Prosecutor's Office for Competition Control, a position that made her eligible to serve as acting attorney general upon the declaration of the vacancy. She subsequently resigned as Legal Counsel of the Federal Executive to assume the acting post.

The Senate opened a public registration period from 28 to 30 November, during which 43 candidates, including Godoy, were registered. On 2 December, the Senate approved a list of ten finalists to be submitted to President Claudia Sheinbaum. The following day, Sheinbaum returned a shortlist composed exclusively of women: Godoy, Luz María Zarza Delgado, and Maribel Bojorges Beltrán.

On 3 December 2025, during her confirmation hearing before the Senate, Godoy outlined a vision of justice centered on scientific, evidence-based investigation and respect for human rights, saying investigations should be based on intelligence and the "route of money" behind sophisticated criminal operations. She also pledged zero tolerance for torture and emphasized respect for constitutional autonomy while affirming continued coordination with the federal security cabinet.

The Senate confirmed Godoy's appointment by a vote of 97–19, with 11 null votes, exceeding the required two-thirds majority. The nomination received the backing of the ruling coalition, all six Citizens' Movement senators, and four National Action Party senators. She was sworn in later that day by the President of the Senate, Laura Itzel Castillo.

=== Tenure ===
During her first weeks in office, Godoy reoriented the Attorney General's Office toward closer coordination with the federal government, marking a departure from the more isolated management style of her predecessor. She subsequently implemented senior personnel changes, appointing close collaborators of Omar García Harfuch to lead the Specialized Prosecutor's Office for Organized Crime (FEMDO) and the Criminal Investigation Agency (AIC), and replacing Adriana Campos López with Richard Urbina Vega as head of the Internal Affairs Prosecutor's Office (FEAI), who had previously worked with Godoy during her tenure in Mexico City.
