= Citlalli Hernández =

Mexican politician (born 1990)

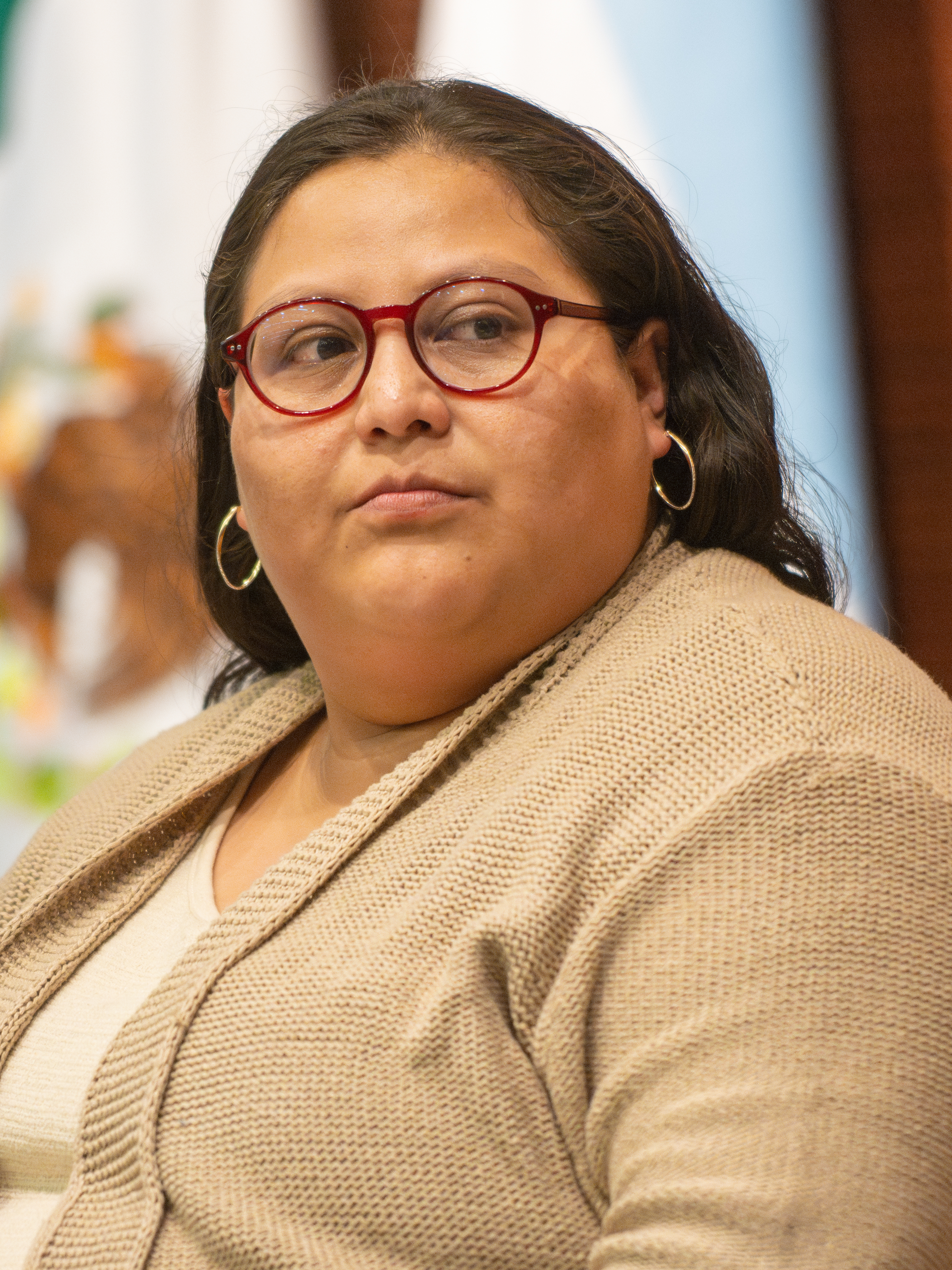
- Hernández in 2024

Secretary of Women
- In office 1 January 2025 – 16 April 2026
- President: Claudia Sheinbaum
- Preceded by: Office established
- Succeeded by: Vacant

Personal details
- Born: 29 April 1990 (age 36)
- Party: National Regeneration Movement

Minerva Citlalli Hernández Mora (born 29 April 1990) is a Mexican politician serving as secretary of women since 2025. In 2024, she served as president of the National Institute of Women. From 2020 to 2024, she served as general secretary of Morena. From 2018 to 2024, she was a member of the Senate of the Republic for Mexico City. From 2015 to 2018, she was a member of the Legislative Assembly of the Federal District.
