= Secretariat of Agrarian, Land, and Urban Development =

Mexican cabinet agency

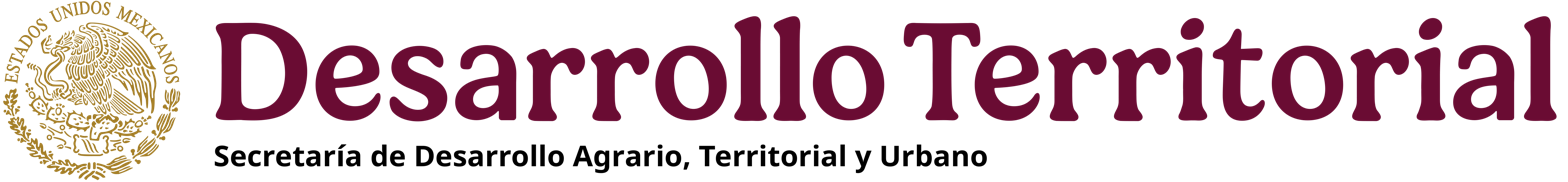
- SEDATU logo 2024

Agency overview
- Website: www.gob.mx/sedatu

The Secretariat for Agrarian, Land and Urban Development (Spanish: Secretaría de Desarrollo Agrario, Territorial y Urbano, SEDATU) is the Mexican cabinet agency in charge of agriculture, urban development and living space.

== History ==
SEDATU was established by reforms to the Organic Law of the Federal Public Administration that were promulgated on January 2, 2013. With its creation, the Secretariat of Agrarian Reform was dissolved.

Subsidiary agencies include Infonavit, the national workers' housing fund.
