= Rogelio Ramírez de la O =

Mexican economist

Rogelio Ramirez de la O
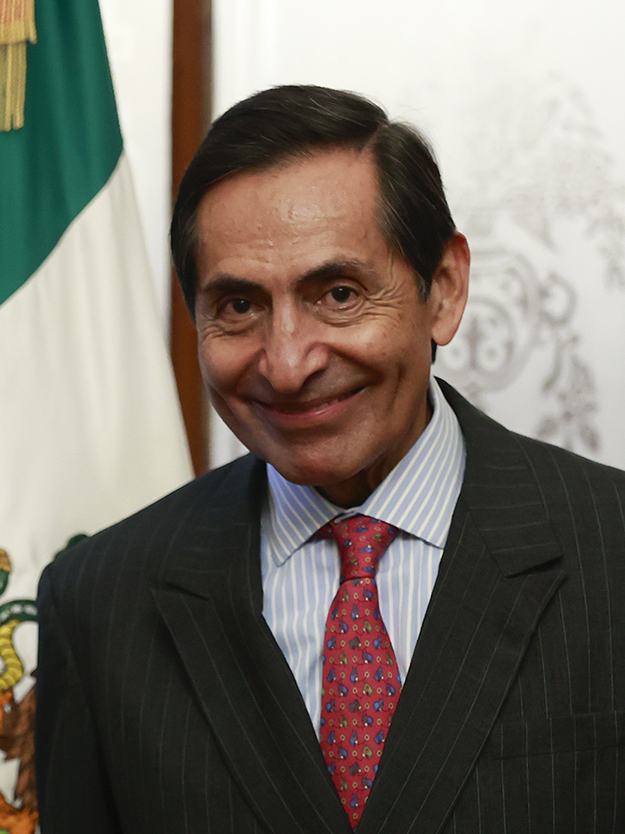

Secretary of the Treasury and Public Credit of Mexico
- In office August 3, 2021 – March 7, 2025
- President: Andrés Manuel López Obrador (2021-2024); Claudia Sheinbaum (2024-2025)
- Preceded by: Arturo Herrera Gutiérrez
- Succeeded by: Edgar Amador Zamora

Personal details
- Born: July 7, 1948 (age 78) Mexico City, Mexico
- Education: National Autonomous University of Mexico (BA); University of Cambridge (PhD)
- Occupation: Economist

Rogelio Ramírez de la O is an economist based in Mexico City. He was designated as finance secretary of Mexico, replacing Arturo Herrera Gutiérrez, a position he held from 2021 to 2025.

== Early life and education ==
Ramírez de la O received a bachelor's degree from the National Autonomous University of Mexico and a PhD in economics from Cambridge University, United Kingdom.

== Career ==
Director and sole partner of Ecanal S.A., a private company which provides macroeconomic analysis and forecasts on Mexico to business, including some of the largest multinational companies with interests in Mexico. During 2006 he headed on an honorary basis the economic policy team of presidential candidate Andrés Manuel López Obrador, backed by a coalition of parties including the PRD (Party of the Democratic Revolution).

He has published works in Mexico, the United States and Europe on NAFTA, Mexico's macroeconomic problems and the Mexican auto industry, among others. In the context of his 2012 presidential election campaign, Andrés Manuel López Obrador included him as Finance Minister in his cabinet proposal, but the party did not win the elections.

== Other activities ==
- European Bank for Reconstruction and Development (EBRD), Ex-Officio Member of the Board of Governors
- World Bank, Ex-Officio Member of the Board of Governors
