= Luisa Alcalde =

Mexican politician

- Alcalde in 2026

Legal Counsel of the Federal Executive
- Incumbent
- Assumed office 4 May 2026
- President: Claudia Sheinbaum
- Preceded by: Esthela Damián Peralta

President of the National Regeneration Movement
- In office 1 October 2024 – 3 May 2026
- Preceded by: Mario Delgado
- Succeeded by: Ariadna Montiel Reyes

Secretary of the Interior
- In office 19 June 2023 – 30 September 2024
- President: Andrés Manuel López Obrador
- Preceded by: Roberto Campa
- Succeeded by: Marath Baruch Bolaños López

Member of the Chamber of Deputies
- In office 1 September 2012 – 31 August 2015
- Constituency: Fourth electoral region

Personal details
- Born: Luisa María Alcalde Luján; 24 August 1987 (age 39) Mexico City, Mexico
- Party: Morena (since 2014)
- Other political affiliations: Citizens' Movement (2000s–2014)
- Education: National Autonomous University of Mexico (Lic.); University of California, Berkeley (LL. M.)
- Website: LuisaMariaAlcalde.com

Luisa María Alcalde Luján (born 24 August 1987) is a Mexican politician who served as the president of the National Regeneration Movement (Morena) from 2024 until April 2026. She currently serves office as Legal Counsel of the Federal Executive. She held multiple cabinet positions under Andrés Manuel López Obrador, serving as Secretary of Labor from 2018 to 2023 and as Secretary of the Interior from 2023 to 2024. She has also been elected as a federal deputy in 2012.

== Early life and education ==
Alcalde was born on 24 August 1987 in Mexico City. Her mother, Bertha Elena Luján Uranga, served as Comptroller General in the government of Andrés Manuel López Obrador during his time as Head of Government of the Federal District (Mayor of Mexico City). Her father, Arturo Alcalde Justiniani, is a labor lawyer.

She attended the National Autonomous University of Mexico (UNAM), graduating with a law degree in 2011. She received a master's degree in law at the University of California, Berkeley.

== Political career ==
=== Early political career ===
She became politically involved in 2005 in support of Andrés Manuel López Obrador, then-Head of Government of the Federal District. Alcalde later became head of the youth arm of the National Regeneration Movement (Morena), then a political association in support of AMLO.

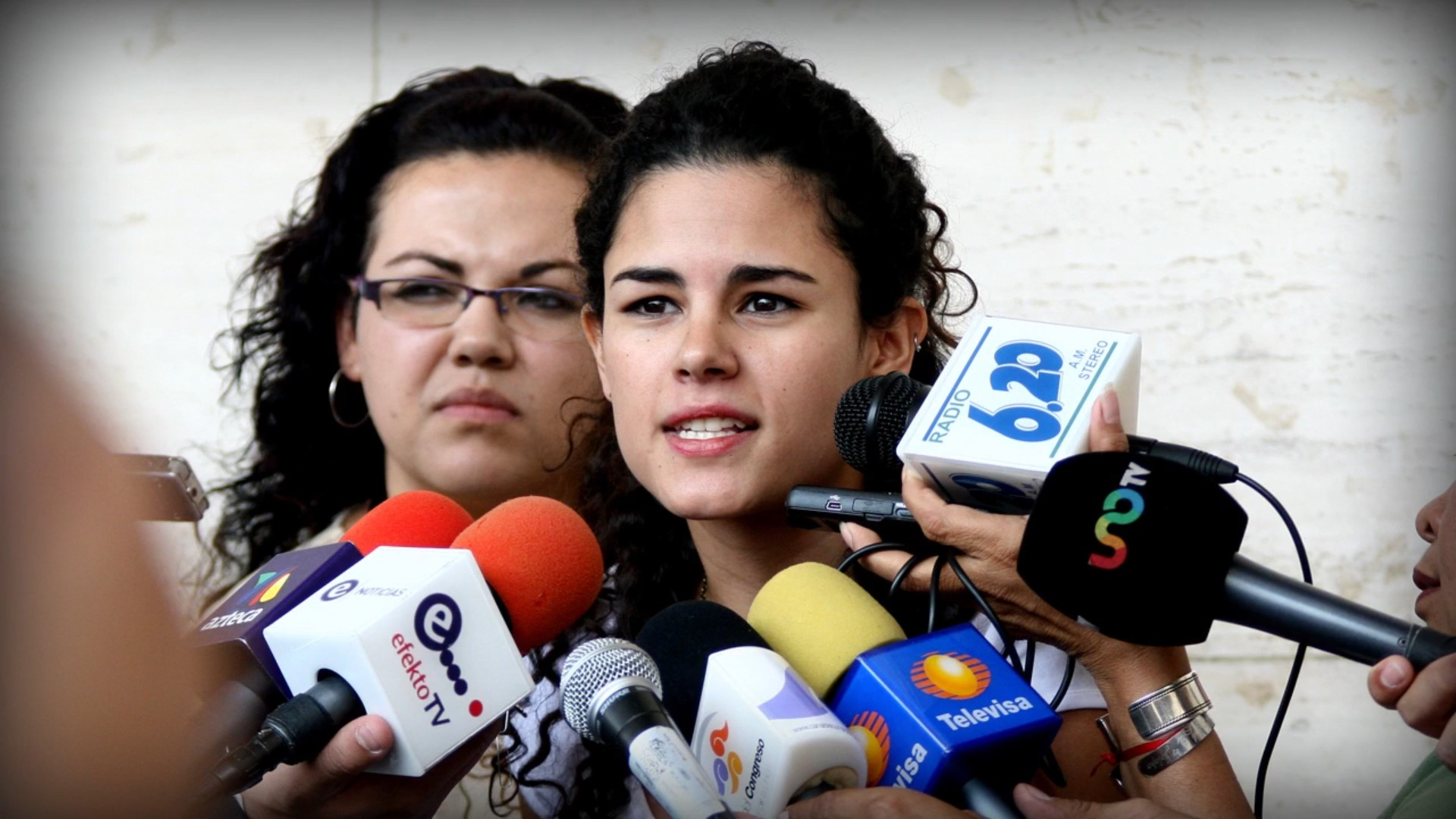
Alcalde in 2012

In 2012, Alcalde was elected to the Chamber of Deputies at the age of 24. She was initially elected as a member of the Citizens' Movement, and served in the Labor and Social Security Committee. As a federal deputy, she accused Governor of Puebla Rafael Moreno Valle Rosas of persecuting activists opposed to the Morelos gas pipeline.

=== AMLO administration ===
In 2018, Alcalde was appointed by AMLO to serve as Secretary of Labor. During tenure in office, the minimum wage increased by approximately 97% when adjusted for inflation. In this position, Alcalde presided over the implementation of the AMLO government's labor reform agenda. In 2023, Alcalde was rumored to be a pre-candidate for Mayor of Mexico City in the 2024 election.

In 2023, Alcalde was appointed Secretary of the Interior, replacing Adán Augusto López, who resigned in order to run for Morena's presidential nomination in 2024. She became the youngest woman to serve in the position at the time of her appointment. Additionally, her appointment made her the second woman to hold the position, after Olga Sánchez Cordero.

Following the election of Claudia Sheinbaum as president, Alcalde has been speculated to be a candidate for leadership of Morena in October 2024. Her possible candidacy has been endorsed by legislator Gerardo Fernández Noroña.

== Personal life ==
Alcalde was previously in a relationship with journalist Eduardo Becerril. She is unmarried. Alcalde and her sister live in an apartment in Colonia Roma Sur in Mexico City.

=== Fake news controversies ===
In 2023, fake news purporting to be images of Alcalde spread on social media. The images were later confirmed to be photographs of model Camila Morena wearing a bikini. In 2024, a deepfake video of Alcalde encouraging viewers to join an investment program via Telegram spread on social media.

=== Family ===
Alcalde's sister, Bertha Alcalde Luján, is an attorney who was nominated by AMLO in 2024 to serve as head of the ISSSTE. Bertha Alcalde Luján had previously been considered by AMLO to serve as president of the National Electoral Institute (INE) and to serve on the Supreme Court.
