= Rosa Icela Rodríguez =

Mexican politician (born 1959)

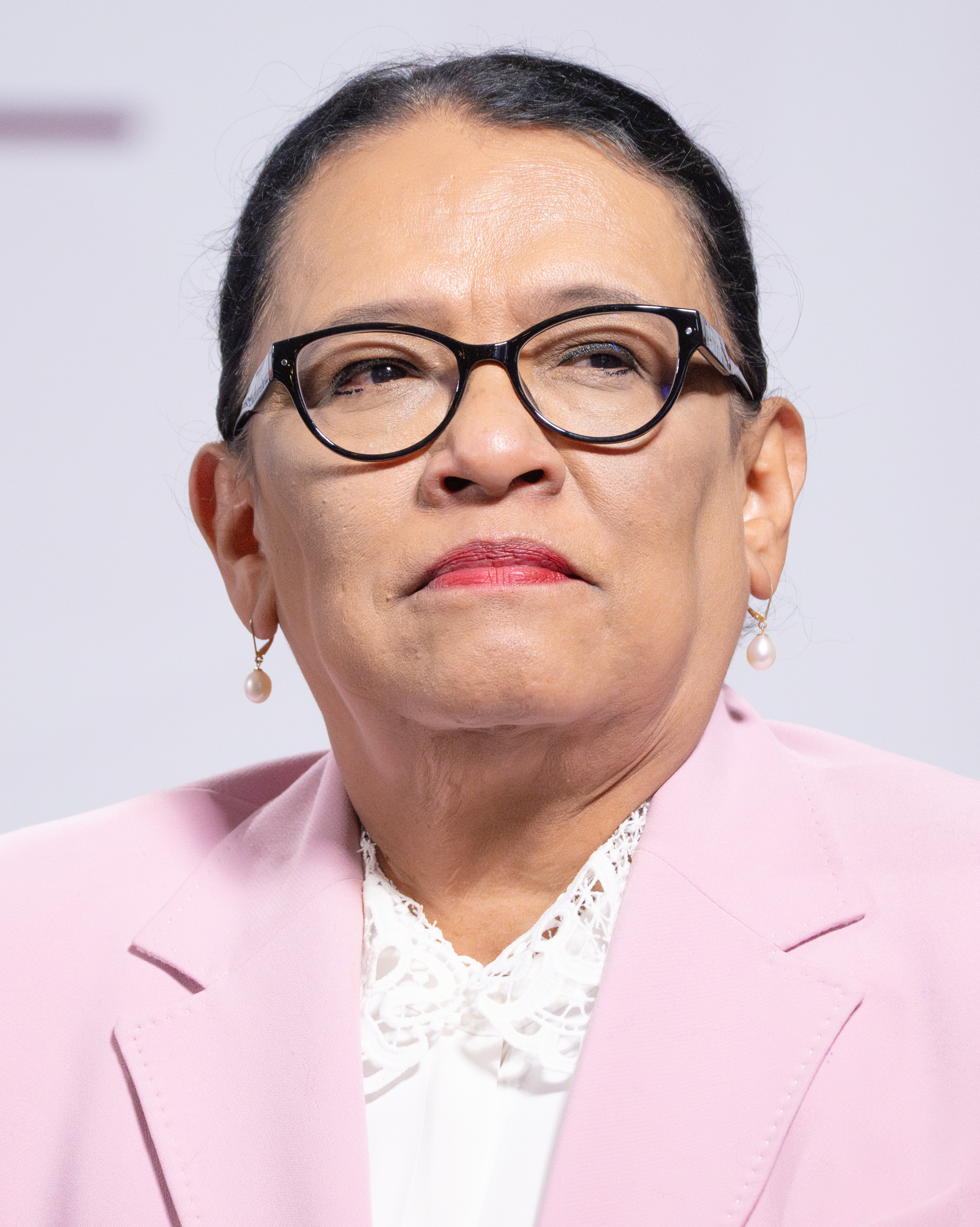
- Rodríguez in 2025

Secretary of the Interior
- Incumbent
- Assumed office 1 October 2024
- President: Claudia Sheinbaum
- Preceded by: Luisa María Alcalde Luján

Secretary of Security and Civilian Protection
- In office 3 November 2020 – 30 September 2024
- President: Andrés Manuel López Obrador
- Preceded by: Alfonso Durazo Montaño
- Succeeded by: Omar García Harfuch

General Coordinator of Ports and Merchant Marine
- In office 27 July 2020 – 29 October 2020
- President: Andrés Manuel López Obrador
- Preceded by: Héctor Juvencio López Gutiérrez
- Succeeded by: Ana Laura López Bautista

Secretary of Government of Mexico City
- In office 5 December 2018 – 26 July 2020
- Preceded by: Guillermo Orozco Loreto
- Succeeded by: José Alfonso Suárez del Real

Secretary of Rural Development and Equity for the Communities of Mexico City
- In office 16 June 2015 – 15 January 2018
- Preceded by: Hegel Cortés Miranda
- Succeeded by: Evangelina Hernández

Secretary of Social Development of Mexico City
- In office 5 December 2012 – 15 June 2015
- Preceded by: Jesús Valdés Peña
- Succeeded by: José Ramón Amieva

Personal details
- Born: Rosa Icela Rodríguez Velázquez; 5 September 1959 (age 67) Xilitla, San Luis Potosí, Mexico
- Party: National Regeneration Movement (since 2018); Party of the Democratic Revolution (2000–2018)
- Education: Degree in Journalism
- Alma mater: Escuela de Periodismo Carlos Septién García
- Profession: Politician and public servant

Rosa Icela Rodríguez Velázquez (Note: In this name that follows Hispanic American naming customs, the first or paternal surname is Rodríguez and the second or maternal family name is Velázquez.) (born 5 September 1959) is a Mexican politician, journalist, and public servant. Currently affiliated with the National Regeneration Movement (Morena), she previously belonged to the Party of the Democratic Revolution (PRD). She has been serving as the Secretary of the Interior since 1 October 2024, under the administration of President Claudia Sheinbaum.

From 2020 to 2024, Rodríguez held the position of Secretary of Security and Citizen Protection during the presidency of Andrés Manuel López Obrador, where she was the first woman in Mexican history to head the nation's public security portfolio. Her tenure marked significant milestones in addressing public safety challenges and implementing reforms in Mexico's security strategy.

== Early life and education ==
Rosa Icela Rodríguez was born in 1959 in Xilitla, San Luis Potosí, in the Huasteca Potosina region. At a young age, her family moved to Ciudad Valles, San Luis Potosí, where she completed her primary education. Later, she relocated to Mexico City, where she pursued journalism at the Carlos Septién García School of Journalism. She worked as a journalist for Televisa Radio, El Universal, La Afición, and La Jornada.

== Early career ==
During the tenure of Andrés Manuel López Obrador as head of the Mexico City government, she held several key positions, including General Director of Citizen Participation and General Director of Political Negotiation and Social and Citizen Attention.

Rodríguez served as the government representative in Territorial Coordination for Public Security and Justice in high-risk areas such as Tepito and the neighborhoods of Doctores and Obrera. She implemented strategies combining intelligence, police operations, and community networks to reduce crime rates in these zones.

Under the government of Marcelo Ebrard, she served as General Coordinator of the Government and Public Security Cabinet (2006–2009) and as director of the Institute for the Care of Older Adults (2009–2012). During the administration of Miguel Ángel Mancera, Rodríguez held the roles of Secretary of Social Development (2012–2015) and Secretary of Rural Development and Equity for Communities (2015–2018).

She was appointed as Secretary of Government of Mexico City from 2018 to 2020, serving under Claudia Sheinbaum.

In 2020, President López Obrador named her General Coordinator of Ports and Merchant Marine. Later that year, she was nominated as Secretary of Security and Citizen Protection, becoming the first woman to hold this position. Her appointment was finalized on 30 December 2020.

On 4 July 2024, President-elect Claudia Sheinbaum announced Rodríguez as the incoming Secretary of the Interior, a role she officially assumed on 1 October 2024.

Rodríguez has been honored with the Omecíhuatl Medal, awarded by the Institute for Women of Mexico City, and the Tepantlato Merit Award in Social Development, among other distinctions.

== Published works ==
She is the co-author of the book Needs for the Care of Older Adults in Mexico City: Diagnosis and Policy Guidelines, co-editor of Autonomy and Dignity in Old Age: Theory and Practice in Policies for the Rights of Older Adults and a contributor to The Rights of Older Adults in the 21st Century: Situation, Experiences, and Challenges. All of these works were published by the United Nations Economic Commission for Latin America and the Caribbean (ECLAC) and the Government of Mexico City.
