= Secretariat of Security and Citizen Protection =

Mexican cabinet-level government agency

- Secretaría de Seguridad y Protección Ciudadana
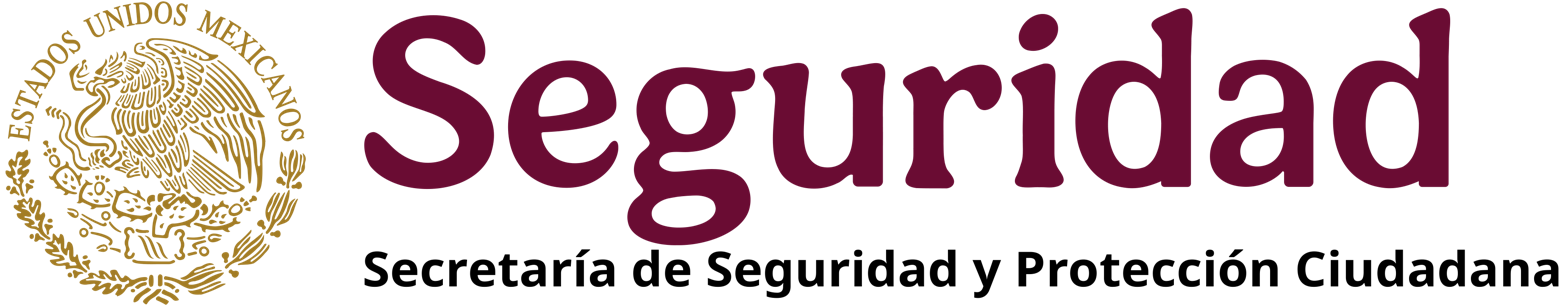

Agency overview
- Formed: 30 November 2018
- Preceding agency: Secretariat of Public Security
- Jurisdiction: Federal government of Mexico
- Headquarters: Avenida Constituyentes 947, Belén de las Flores, Álvaro Obregón, Mexico City; 19.3956568°N 99.2221788°W
- Agency executive: Omar García Harfuch, Secretary
- Child agency: Underministry of Police Operation Underministry of Certification and Combating Corruption Underministry of Planning, Information and Civil Protection Underministry of Investigation and Police Intelligence
- Website: https://www.gob.mx/sspc

The Secretariat of Security and Citizen Protection (Spanish: Secretaría de Seguridad y Protección Ciudadana or SSPC) is a cabinet-level agency of the federal government of Mexico responsible for overseeing public safety, civil protection, and national intelligence. It is tasked with coordinating the federal government's efforts to maintain peace and supervise law enforcement protocols. The secretariat is currently headed by Omar García Harfuch.

== History ==
The Secretariat of Security and Civilian Protection (SSPC) was formally created through a reform to the Organic Law of the Federal Public Administration published on 30 November 2018, during the transition to the presidency of Andrés Manuel López Obrador. The reform introduced Article 30-Bis, which defined the new secretariat’s powers and responsibilities. Its Internal Regulations were later published on 30 April 2019, establishing its administrative structure. With its creation, the SSPC absorbed most federal security functions previously managed by the Secretariat of the Interior (SEGOB), including responsibilities left after the dissolution of the former Secretariat of Public Security in 2013 under President Enrique Peña Nieto.

From its inception, one of the SSPC’s central mandates was the establishment and oversight of the newly created National Guard. In 2019, constitutional amendments dissolved the Federal Police and replaced it with the National Guard, which was legally defined as a civilian public security force under the authority of the SSPC.Although the National Guard was largely composed of personnel transferred from the Federal Police and the military police corps of the Army and Navy, the SSPC remained the designated civilian command, responsible for ensuring compliance with human rights and policing standards.

In September 2022, Congress approved secondary legislation transferring operational and administrative control of the National Guard from the SSPC to the Secretariat of National Defense (SEDENA), effectively reducing the SSPC’s operational capabilities and leaving it largely as a policy-designing institution. In April 2023, the Supreme Court of Justice of the Nation (SCJN) ruled the transfer unconstitutional, holding that the Constitution explicitly placed the National Guard under the SSPC. The decision temporarily required the federal government to return command authority to the civilian secretariat, though the executive continued pressing for military integration of the corps. In the final days of the López Obrador administration, Congress approved a constitutional reform package, published on 30 September 2024 and effective the following day, that amended several constitutional articles to permanently place the National Guard under SEDENA, effectively concluding the legal dispute over its command.

Under the administration of President Claudia Sheinbaum, Congress approved an additional constitutional amendment to Article 21, ratified and published in December 2024. The reform redefined the SSPC as a coordination-focused civilian security authority, expanding its responsibilities in intelligence, oversight, and crime prevention. It granted the SSPC authority to carry out investigative functions, which were previously reserved exclusively to the Attorney General´s Office, allowing the development of intelligence-based inquiries to support criminal cases. The amendment also empowered the secretariat to audit federal security funds allocated to state governments and placed it in charge of the newly created National Intelligence System, positioning the agency as the central coordinating body of federal security policy while SEDENA retained command of uniformed security forces.

== Organizational structure ==
=== Deconcentrated Administrative Bodies ===
These agencies are autonomous in their technical operations but report to the SSPC.

- National Intelligence Center (Spanish: Centro Nacional de Inteligencia - CNI)
- Executive Secretariat of the National Public Security System (Spanish: Secretariado Ejecutivo del Sistema Nacional de Seguridad Pública - SESNSP)
- National Anti-Kidnapping Coordination (Spanish: Coordinación Nacional Antisecuestro - CONASE)
- Federal Protection Service (Spanish: Servicio de Protección Federal - SPF)
- National Center for Disaster Prevention (Spanish: Centro Nacional de Prevención de Desastres - CENAPRED)
- Administrative Body for Prevention and Social Readaptation (Spanish: Órgano Administrativo Desconcentrado de Prevención y Readaptación Social - OADPRS)

== List of secretaries of Security and Citizen Protection ==
No.	Portrait	Name	Term of office	Duration	Political Party	President
1		Alfonso Durazo	1 December 2018 – 1 November 2020	1 year, 336 days	National Regeneration Movement	Andrés Manuel López Obrador (2018–2024)
2		Rosa Icela Rodríguez	3 November 2020 – 30 September 2024	3 years, 332 days	National Regeneration Movement	Andrés Manuel López Obrador (2018–2024)
3		Omar García Harfuch	1 October 2024 – Incumbent	2 years, 22 days	National Regeneration Movement	Claudia Sheinbaum (2024–present)

== See also ==
- Cabinet of Mexico
