= Marath Baruch Bolaños López =

Mexican politician (born 1986)

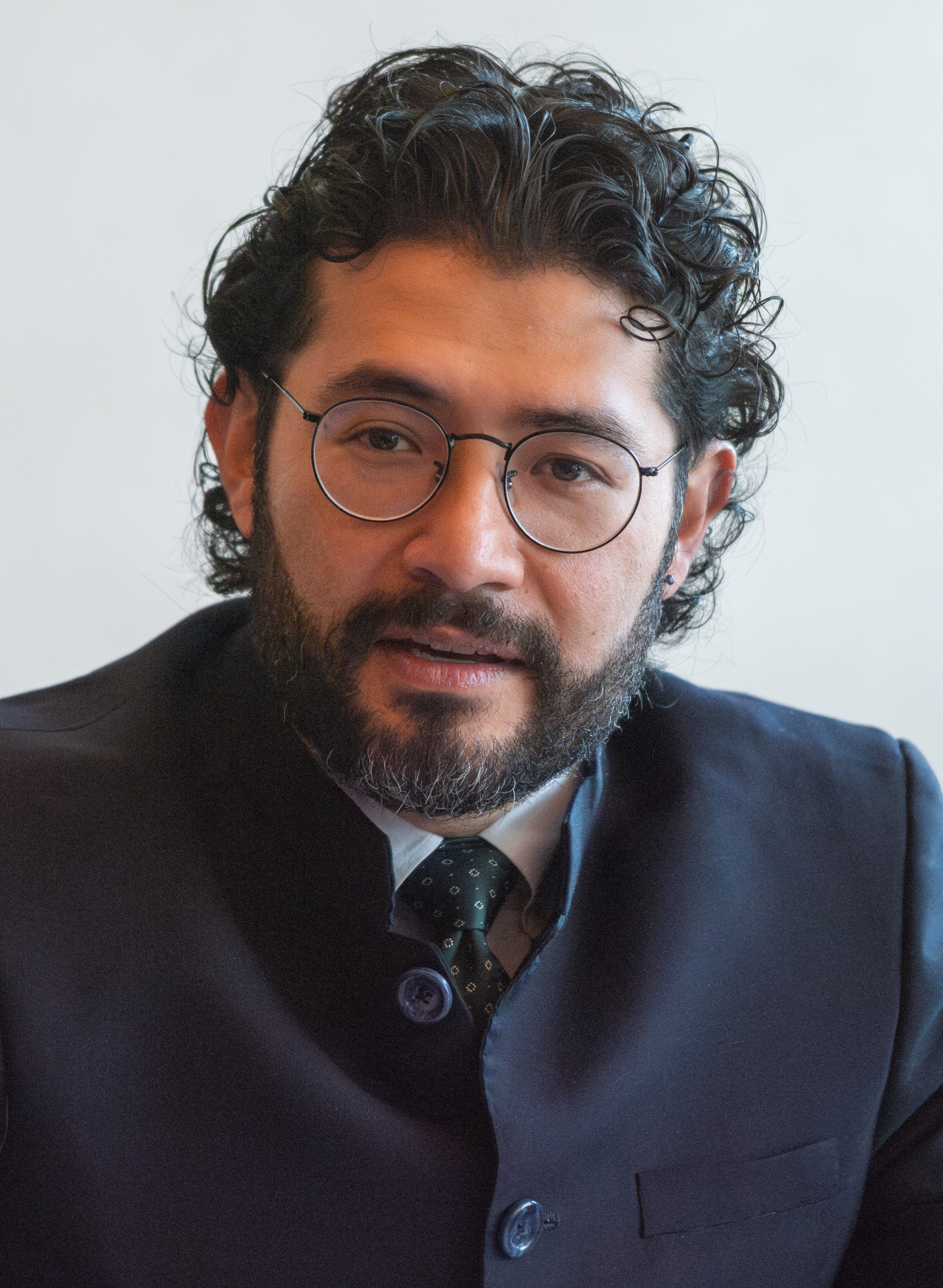
- Bolaños López in 2024

Secretary of Labor and Social Welfare
- Incumbent
- Assumed office 20 June 2023
- President: Andrés Manuel López Obrador; Claudia Sheinbaum
- Preceded by: Luisa María Alcalde Luján

Personal details
- Born: 7 July 1986 (age 39)
- Party: Morena (since 2014)

Marath Baruch Bolaños López (born 7 July 1986) is a Mexican politician serving as secretary of labor and social welfare since 2023. From 2020 to 2023, he served as undersecretary of employment and labor productivity.

== Controversies ==
On May 14, 2026, while delivering a keynote lecture titled "New Labor Pact in Mexico's Transformation: The Spring of Labor Rights" at the National Autonomous University of Mexico (UNAM), a group of activists from the National Front for 40 Hours interrupted the event. The protesters accused Bolaños of being a "fraud" and his institution of being "sold out" to business interests, criticizing that the labor reform did not guarantee two weekly days of rest and that public consultation forums had been a sham.

Bolaños was escorted out of the venue by the faculty director, Alejandro Chanona, through an emergency exit, and the event was canceled. Hours later, he issued a statement saying that universities are spaces for debate and that his agency prioritizes respectful dialogue.
