= Édgar Amador Zamora =

Mexican politician (born 1967)

Secretary of Finance and Public Credit
- Incumbent
- Assumed office 8 March 2025
- President: Claudia Sheinbaum
- Preceded by: Rogelio Ramírez de la O

Personal details
- Born: 23 July 1967 (age 59) Monclova, Coahuila, Mexico
- Party: Independent
- Education: National Autonomous University of Mexico (BA); El Colegio de México (MA)

Édgar Amador Zamora (Note: In this Mexican name, the surname is Amador and the second or maternal family name is Zamora.) (born 23 July 1967) is a Mexican politician serving as secretary of finance and public credit since March 2025. From 2024 to 2025, he served as undersecretary of finance and public credit.

== Early life and education ==
Amador Zamora was born in Monclova, Coahuila, in 1967. He earned a bachelor of arts degree in economics from the National Autonomous University of Mexico (UNAM) between 1985 and 1991. He also obtained a master of arts degree in economics from El Colegio de México in 1994.

He previously served as secretary of finance of Mexico City in the administration of Head of Government Miguel Ángel Mancera and has worked at the Banco de México, the country's central bank. He took office as secretary of finance and public credit, succeeding Rogelio Ramírez de la O, on 8 March 2025.
