= Esthela Damián Peralta =

Mexican politician (born 1972)

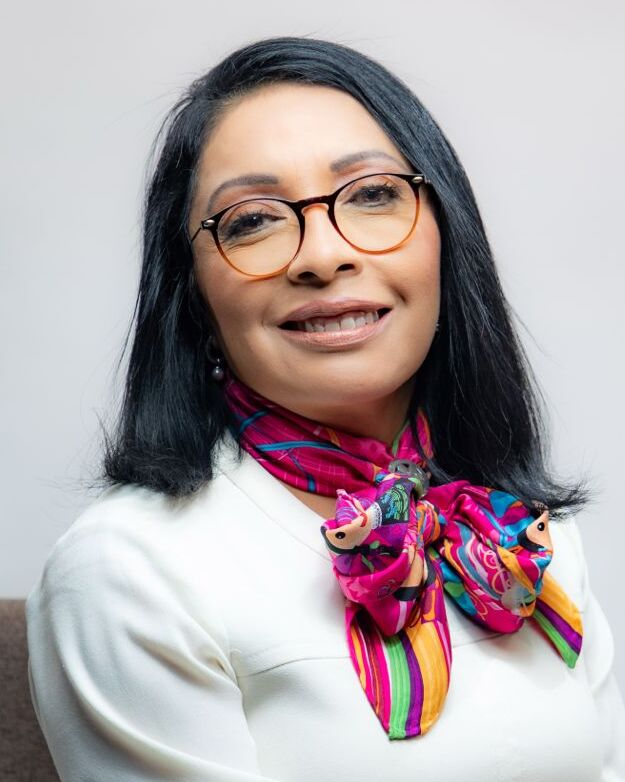

Legal Counsel to the Executive of Mexico
- In office 17 December 2025 – 30 April 2026
- President: Claudia Sheinbaum
- Preceded by: Ernestina Godoy
- Succeeded by: Luisa María Alcalde

Undersecretary for the Prevention of Violence, Ministry of Security and Civilian Protection
- In office 9 October 2024 – 17 December 2025

Director of the Mexico City DIF
- In office 5 December 2018 – 4 October 2024
- Succeeded by: Beatriz Rojas Martínez

Member of the Constituent Assembly of Mexico City
- In office 15 September 2016 – 31 January 2017
- Constituency: Proportional representation

Member of the Legislative Assembly of the Federal District
- In office 15 September 2012 – 14 September 2015
- Succeeded by: Elena Edith Segura Trejo
- Constituency: 10th district

Member of the Chamber of Deputies
- In office 1 September 2009 – 31 August 2012
- Preceded by: Victorio Montalvo Rojas
- Succeeded by: Israel Moreno Rivera
- Constituency: 9th district, Federal District

Member of the Legislative Assembly of the Federal District
- In office 15 September 2006 – 14 August 2009
- Constituency: 11th district

Personal details
- Born: 8 August 1972 (age 54) Chilpancingo, Guerrero, Mexico
- Party: Morena
- Education: Autonomous University of Guerrero (Lawyer)
- Occupation: Politician and Lawyer

Esthela Damián Peralta (Note: In this Mexican name, the surname is Damián and the second or maternal family name is Peralta.) (born 8 August 1972) is a Mexican politician and lawyer, a member of Morena. She served as Legal Counsel to the Executive under President Claudia Sheinbaum from December 2025 to April 2026, when she resigned to seek Morena's nomination for Governor of Guerrero in the 2027 election.

Earlier in her career she served two terms in the Legislative Assembly of the Federal District, one term as a federal deputy, and one term in the Constituent Assembly that drafted Mexico City's constitution. She later headed Mexico City's family-welfare agency (DIF) and was an undersecretary at the federal Ministry of Security and Civilian Protection.

== Early years and education ==
Damián was born in Chilpancingo, Guerrero. She holds a law degree from the Autonomous University of Guerrero (1990–1995), along with diplomas in accounting, public administration, electoral law and human development.

== Political career ==
=== Legislative Assembly of the Federal District (2006–2009) ===
Damián was elected to the Legislative Assembly of the Federal District (ALDF) for the 11th district in 2006, serving from September 2006 to August 2009. She sat on the Economic Development Committee and put forward a proposal calling on the Federal District government to waive fines and surcharges on unpaid water-service fees, in October 2007.

=== Chamber of Deputies (2009–2012) ===
She was subsequently elected to the federal Chamber of Deputies for the 9th district of the Federal District, serving from September 2009 to August 2012.

=== Legislative Assembly of the Federal District (2012–2015) ===
She returned to the ALDF for a second term, representing the 10th district (Venustiano Carranza), from September 2012 to September 2015. As a local deputy she introduced a reform on public-accounts review deadlines (October 2012); a bill on alternative care arrangements for children and adolescents, with Efraín Morales López and Daniel Ordóñez Hernández (March 2014); a constitutional reform on the administrative and political responsibility of Mexico City public servants, with the same co-sponsors (April 2014); and a bill on the territorial boundary between the boroughs of Tláhuac and Xochimilco. As a member of the joint budget, finance and labor committees, she also presented the reform replacing minimum-wage references with the "Unidad de Cuenta" in local statutes and a bill amending the law on psychoactive-substance treatment, in November 2014.

In 2015 she left the PRD for Movimiento Ciudadano and ran unsuccessfully for borough president of Venustiano Carranza.

=== Constituent Assembly of Mexico City (2016–2017) ===
She was elected to the Constituent Assembly of Mexico City, serving from September 2016 to January 2017, where she argued for the elimination of legal immunity ("fuero") for city officials. She left Movimiento Ciudadano in October 2017 over its alliance with the National Action Party, and joined Morena that same year.

=== Director of the Mexico City DIF ===
Damián was named director of Mexico City's Sistema para el Desarrollo Integral de la Familia (DIF) by incoming head of government Claudia Sheinbaum in August 2018, taking office in December 2018 and continuing under Martí Batres. During her tenure the agency ran youth and school-meal programs, including emergency food aid for over a million students during COVID-19 school closures. She left the post in October 2024; Clara Brugada named Beatriz Rojas Martínez as her successor later that month.

=== Undersecretary for the Prevention of Violence ===
From October 2024 to December 2025, Damián served as Undersecretary for the Prevention of Violence at the federal Ministry of Security and Civilian Protection, under Secretary Omar García Harfuch. In that role she promoted the "Jóvenes Sembradores de Paz" youth program.

=== Legal Counsel to the Executive ===
On 17 December 2025, President Sheinbaum named Damián Legal Counsel to the Executive, succeeding Ernestina Godoy, who moved to head the Attorney General's Office. She resigned effective 30 April 2026, to return to Guerrero and seek Morena's gubernatorial nomination; Sheinbaum invited Luisa María Alcalde to succeed her, and Alcalde took office on 1 May 2026.

== 2027 Guerrero gubernatorial bid ==
After leaving the Legal Counsel's office, Damián returned to Guerrero to seek Morena's nomination for governor in the 2027 election. In June 2026 she said she was not "the President's candidate" and described Morena's internal process as fair.
