= Interoceanic Corridor of the Isthmus of Tehuantepec =

Trade route in southern Mexico

Interoceanic Corridor of the Isthmus of Tehuantepec Corredor Interoceánico del Istmo de Tehuantepec

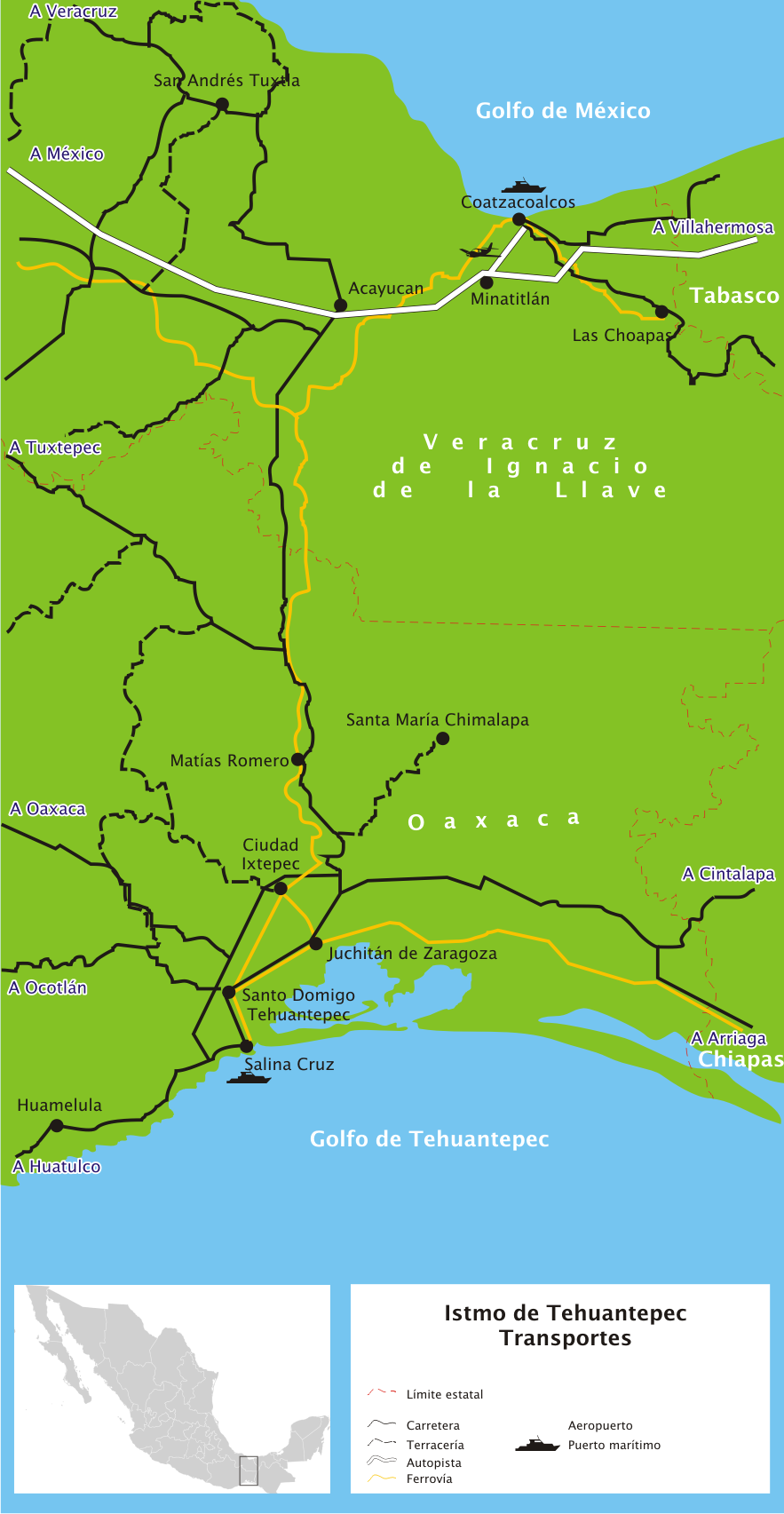
- Map of the Isthmus of Tehuantepec showing the location of the ports of Salina Cruz and Coatzacoalcos, and the area's roads (as of September 2006), including railways
- Coordinates: 17°18′00″N 94°59′24″W

Specifications
- Length: 303 km (188 miles)
- Status: Main railway line open, two more lines planned for March and July 2024. Salina Cruz port still under construction
- Navigation authority: Secretariat of the Navy

History
- Date approved: 14 June 2019
- Construction began: 7 June 2020
- Date of first use: 28 August 2023 (freight); 17 September 2023 (passenger)
- Date completed: 22 December 2023 (railway)

Geography
- Start point: Salina Cruz, Oaxaca
- End point: Coatzacoalcos, Veracruz
- Connects to: Pacific Ocean from Atlantic Ocean and vice versa

The Interoceanic Corridor of the Isthmus of Tehuantepec (Spanish: Corredor Interoceánico del Istmo de Tehuantepec), abbreviated as CIIT, is a trade and transit route in Southern Mexico, under the control of the Mexican Secretariat of the Navy, which connects the Pacific and Atlantic Oceans through a railway system, the Railway of the Isthmus of Tehuantepec (Ferrocarril del Istmo de Tehuantepec), for both cargo and passengers, crossing through the Isthmus of Tehuantepec. The project includes the modernization and expansion of local seaports, particularly the ports of Salina Cruz (Oaxaca) and Coatzacoalcos (Veracruz), and of the Minatitlán oil refinery and the Salina Cruz oil refinery. It plans to attract private investors through the creation of 10 industrial parks in the isthmus area, and two parks in Chiapas. The project aims to develop the economy and industry of the Mexican South through encouraging economic investment, both national and international, and facilitating commerce and transportation of goods internationally.

Initiated under the presidency of Andrés Manuel López Obrador, analysts widely regard it as his most important project, as it has the potential to offer a long-term boost to the Mexican economy and develop the industry and economy of the South, which has been one of the poorest regions of the country for decades. Experts associated with the project reported that it had the potential to be an alternative "cheaper and faster than the Panama Canal."

The project consists of the rehabilitation of the Tehuantepec Railway, which was completed during the presidency of Porfirio Díaz in 1907, and was built with similar goals, but started to fall out of use upon the outbreak of the Mexican Revolution and the opening of the Panama Canal in 1914. It also will modernize the ports of Salina Cruz, which opens to the Pacific Ocean, and Coatzacoalcos, to the Atlantic. As part of the project, 10 industrial parks will be built in the area surrounding the railway to encourage economic investment and industrial development in the region.

On 18 September 2023, the director of the CIIT at the time, Raymundo Pedro Morales Ángeles, announced that the Corridor's freight services on the Coatzacoalcos-Salina Cruz line (Line Z) officially began "from this very moment", and that the Coatzacoalcos-Palenque line (Line FA) began that same month. Line Z was officially opened for passengers on December 22, but cargo operations were delayed.

== History ==
Mexico topographic map

=== Background ===
Plans to connect these two oceans through the Isthmus of Tehuantepec had existed since the Colonial period in the 16th century, with plans to build a canal or highway in the site being considered, but never successfully executed. As early as the first half of that century, during the early years of the existence of the Viceroyalty of New Spain, the Spanish colony which is now Mexico, the Spanish conquistador Hernán Cortés had already expressed his interest in creating communication between the two oceans in his letters to Charles V, Holy Roman Emperor, though this doesn't necessarily mean he conceived the idea of using the isthmus for this purpose. Due to the short distance between the two oceans in this area, the potential for the creation of such a project had been attractive to various global powers, including Spain, Britain, France, the Netherlands and finally the United States, as it would have saved cost and time. During the 19th century, when the Cape Horn route was the only seaway to the other side of the Americas, a canal would have reduced the risk to lives and produce: cargo ships were frequently lost around the Horn.

Alexander von Humboldt wrote in his Political Essay on the Kingdom of New Spain, published in 1811, that the Isthmus of Tehuantepec was ideal for the creation of a canal to connect the Pacific and Atlantic Oceans, due to the proximity between the ports of Vera Cruz and Tehuantepec, finding that the isthmus between them is the narrowest point between the two oceans in New Spain, and due to the proximity of the sources of the Coatzacoalcos and Chimalapa rivers, which discharge into the Gulf of Mexico and the Pacific Ocean respectively. In the Essay, he mentioned multiple points in the Spanish Americas where the two oceans could be connected, including the Isthmus of Panama (belonging to the Viceroyalty of New Granada), remarking the fact that Vasco Núñez de Balboa successfully crossed it as early as 1513 (several years before Mexico was conquered by Spain), but that since then, at the time of the work's publication, no survey of the region nor the determination of its exact geographic position had been made, despite propositions being made since 1528 suggesting cutting that isthmus and joining the sources of local rivers.

He also remarked that Viceroy Juan Vicente de Güemes, 2nd Count of Revillagigedo, "has been for a longtime occupied" in the project of the creation of such a canal, and that land-based roads had been opened in the isthmus since the late 18th century, which created commercial communication between the two oceans; these were used, he remarked, to transport "the most precious of all known indigoes", the indigo from Guatemala (then a kingdom belonging to New Spain covering much of Central America, bordering Panama, though, according to Humboldt, it "depends very little on the viceroy of New Spain"), and cacao from Guayaquil (in modern-day Ecuador, then part of the Real Audiencia de Quito) to Acapulco and, from there, to Vera Cruz to be sent to Europe, so as to avoid the dangers and difficulties of navigation to and through Cape Horn. He remarked in the Essay the natural beauty and rich resources of the intendancy of Oaxaca, where Tehuantepec is located, and stated that the port "will become one day of great consequence when navigation in general, and especially the transport of the indigo of Guatimala, shall become more frequent by the Rio Guasacualco [sic]."

In 1774, the Spanish authorities conducted geological research in the isthmus and issued a decree in 1814 allowing their colony to create a canal, but this would not occur until Mexico became an independent nation in 1821. Shortly after the independence, the Mexican government conducted its own surveys in the region, which resulted in the survey teams proposing the idea of the construction of a railroad, though this was not done due to Mexico's economic crisis of this period.

=== First attempts to connect the Pacific and Atlantic Oceans through the Isthmus of Tehuantepec ===
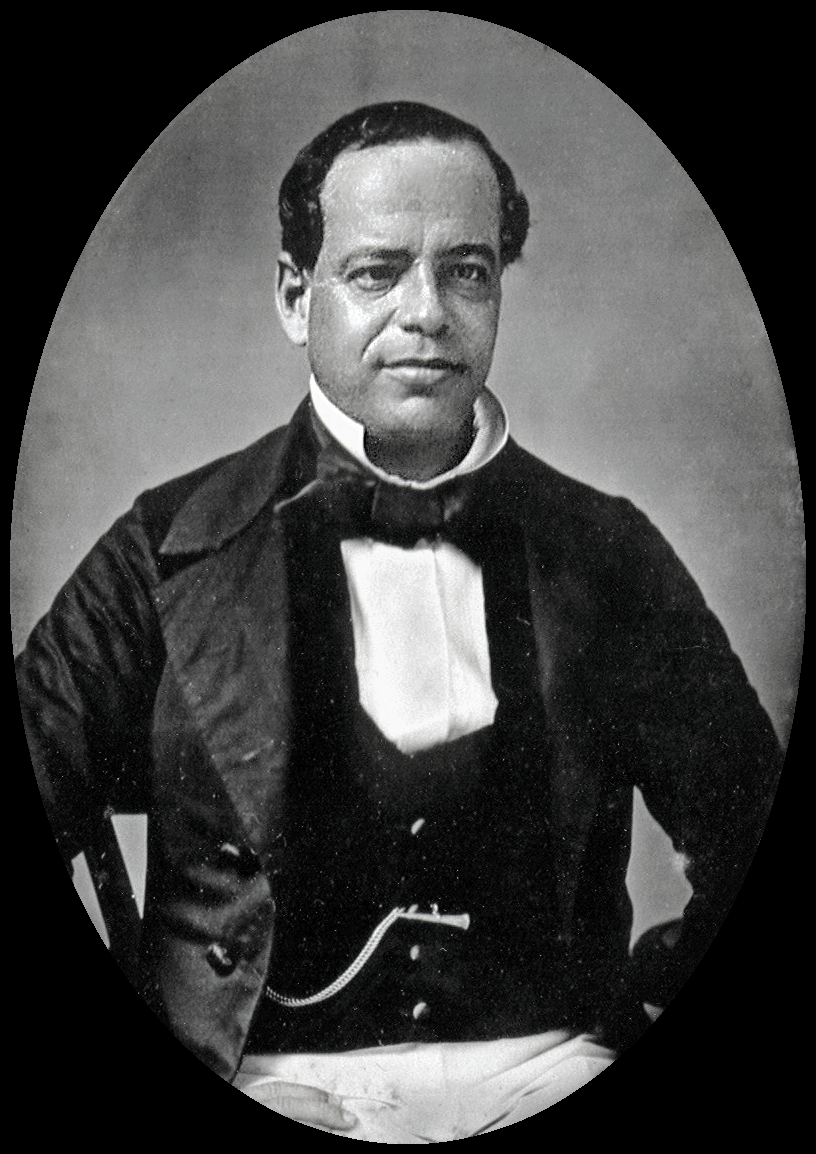
Antonio López de Santa Anna

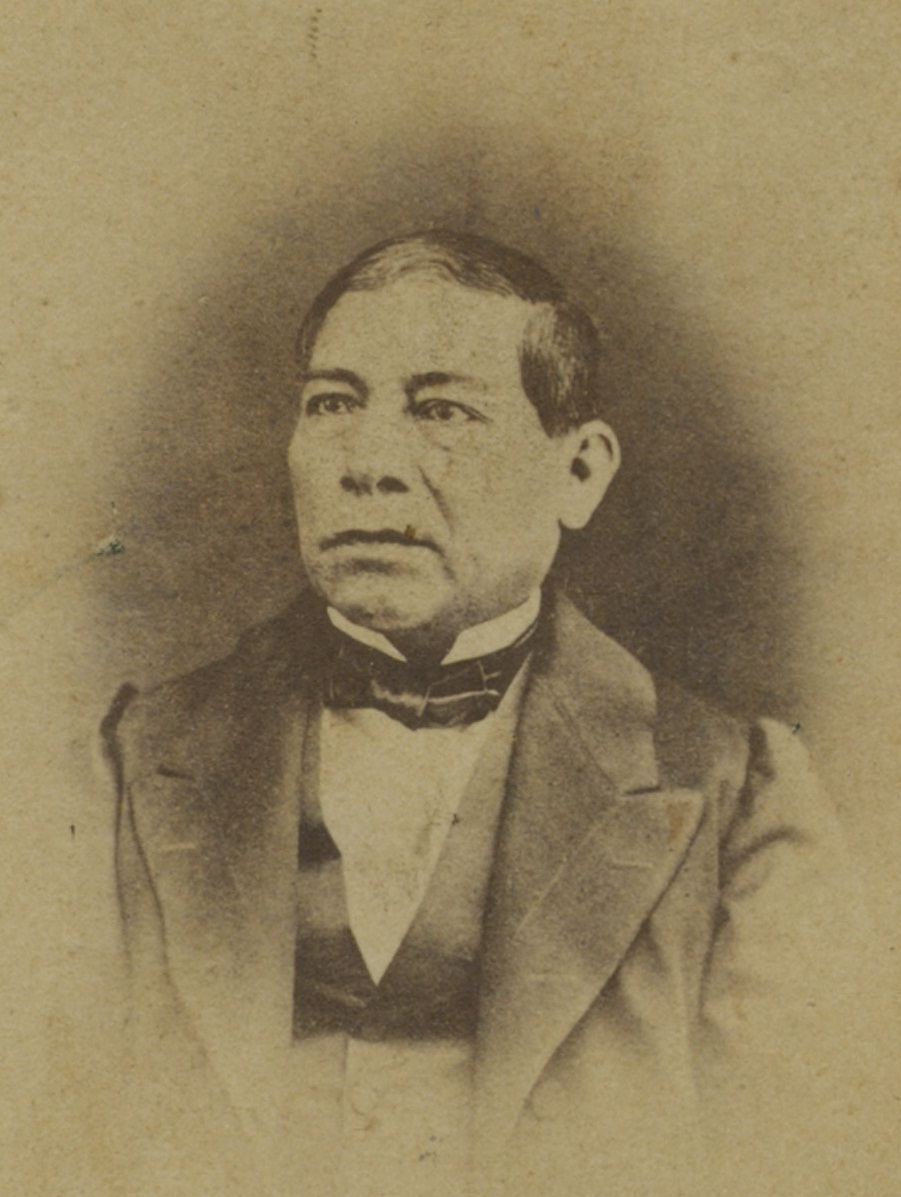
Benito Juárez

During the period within the governments of López de Santa Anna and Juárez, various attempts were made to link the Pacific and Atlantic Oceans through the Isthmus of Tehuantepec, but none were successful

Mexico had seen the commercial opportunities brought by railway systems since the early years of this industry. Just 7 years after the Liverpool and Manchester Railway was opened in England, Mexican President Anastasio Bustamante, on 22 August 1837, offered a concession to a man from Veracruz named Francisco de Arrillaga with the purpose of building a railway line between Mexico City and Veracruz. Under this concession, the railway was to be finished in 12 years and no other entity was allowed to build a railway between the two cities in 30 years. Though nothing would come about this concession, the Mexican government would continue to try to connect the ports of Veracruz with the country's capital and the Pacific Ocean.

==== The Garay concession and the New Orleans company ====
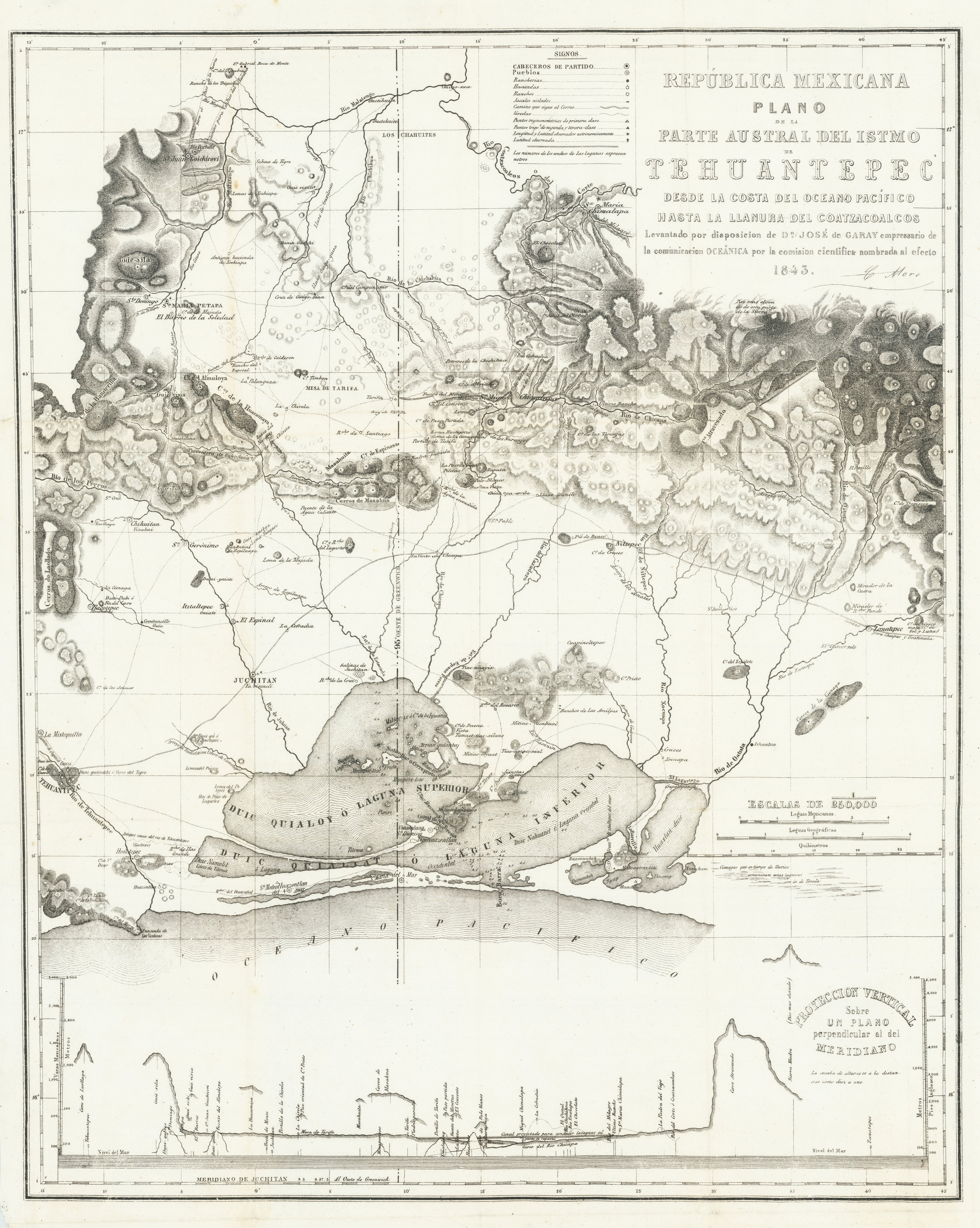
Map of the southern portion of the Isthmus of Tehuantepec based on the Garay survey, showing with three-parallel-line markers the proposed trenches to lead the waters of certain rivers to certain locations, dated to the year 1843 and included in the 1846 account

No serious attempts to construct the corridor would be made until 1842, during the provisional government of Antonio López de Santa Anna, when plans were made to build an interoceanic communication line in the isthmus (though no such line would be built). The task to achieve this was given to a businessman named José de Garay on March 1 of that year, who would be entitled to collect tolls for its usage for 50 years, paying 1/4 of the profits to the Mexican treasury, and to own uncultivated land stretching 55.7 km (34.6 mi) toward either side of the route, on which he could establish worker colonies. Garay was to conduct, at his own expense, a survey of the region within 18 months at most and the construction of the communication line had to begin within the following 10.

Though the idea of a railway was the one initially proposed and which would be ultimately executed, the lead engineer, the Italian-born Gaetano Moro, advocated for the creation of a ship canal with 150 locks instead, estimating the cost of its construction at the "woefully optimistic" sum of nearly £3.4 million pounds sterling (roughly US$13.5 million), using the Caledonian Canal, in Scotland, as a model. The "Canal of Tehuantepec" proposal "differs in no extraordinary degree [...] from similar works already executed in Great Britain, France, Holland, or the United States", as an account of the project published in 1846 stated. The proposal was to join the waters of the Ostuta River with the Chicapa River nearby, which discharge into Laguna Inferior and Laguna Superior respectively, using trenches, then deliver the waters to the site of Tarifa, and from there create the canal using the nearby rivers, such as the Tarifa, Chichihua and Malatengo to the Gulf and the Chicapa to the Pacific. Garay was officially given the land the concession granted him in March 1843 after delivering the results of the survey, being secured by the Minister of Foreign Affairs and Home Department José María Bocanegra. However, the concession would have expired in July 1844 since the project fell stagnant due to a lack of funds (despite getting access to free labor from three hundred convicts in October, also secured by Bocanegra), but Garay asked for a two-year long renewal a few days before the deadline.

Garay understood that solely with Mexican capital the project could not be fully funded, thus he traveled to London, England, in 1844 (where he also published the results of his survey) in hopes of finding investors. Though initially unsuccessful due to hostilities breaking out in May 1846 between Mexico and its northern neighbor, the United States, he managed to renew his grant for two years in November 1846, during the administration of José Mariano Salas, after ceding the lands and privilege to build the communication line in August to the Mexico City-based firm of Manning and Mackintosh; owned by Robert Manning and Ewing C. Mackintosh, representatives of British bondholder committees in Mexico; and to the London-based Schneider & Co., Schneider being an English consul involved in the exploitation of mahogany in the isthmus. This agreement was ratified in 1847. Throughout the year of 1848, however, Manning and Mackintosh, along with Garay, attempted to sell the concession to the British and United States governments, and then to private U.S. citizens after failing to do so. 18 months would pass without any notable advancements in the project, despite Manning insisting the contrary in an exposition before the government in January 1849.

As these firms disputed with the Mexican government over the validy of this agreement throughout the months following the purchase, they started to look for investors from the United States, as, upon the aftermath of the Mexican–American War, demand from American businesses to connect the East and West Coasts through Mexico with benefits from the defeated Mexican government increased, as the war resulted in Mexico ceding the state of California to the U.S., in the American West Coast. Additionally, the discovery of gold in California further increased demands, turning the previously limited commerce of the Mexican Pacific coast into a highly sought-after industry. The U.S. had expressed great interest on the Isthmuses of Tehuantepec and Panama for years before, and throughout the course of the Mexican–American War, as U.S. troops approached the Mexican capital, U.S. politicians insisted that a peace treaty should be negotiated which granted their country the right to use the Tehuantepec route. For example, Nicholas Trist, who negotiated the peace between the two countries, attempted to purchase, as he was instructed, the right of "passage and transit" through the isthmus for $15 million, but failed as the Mexican government announced in September 1847 the existence of the Garay grant and the subsequent purchase of it by Manning and Mackintosh. Trist continued to insist, but ultimately failed at his objective and no mention of the right of passage through the Isthmus of Tehuantepec was included in the Treaty of Guadalupe Hidalgo, signed on 2 February 1848 to end the war. In February 1849, the British firm sold Garay's concession to a New York City businessman named Peter A. Hargous (speculatively for a modest amount), who proceeded to attract attention from investors through soliciting articles to major newspapers across the American East Coast and the South, and, collaborating with Garay, through a general railroad convention held in October in Memphis, Tennessee. Through these efforts, they managed to attract the attention of wealthy businessmen from New Orleans, Louisiana, at the time the most important city in the South of the U.S., who proceeded to publish an article in The Daily Picayune addressing the Tehuantepec route, offering attractive, albeit exaggerated and at times inaccurate, descriptions of the site, immediately attracting the attention of the city's business elite.

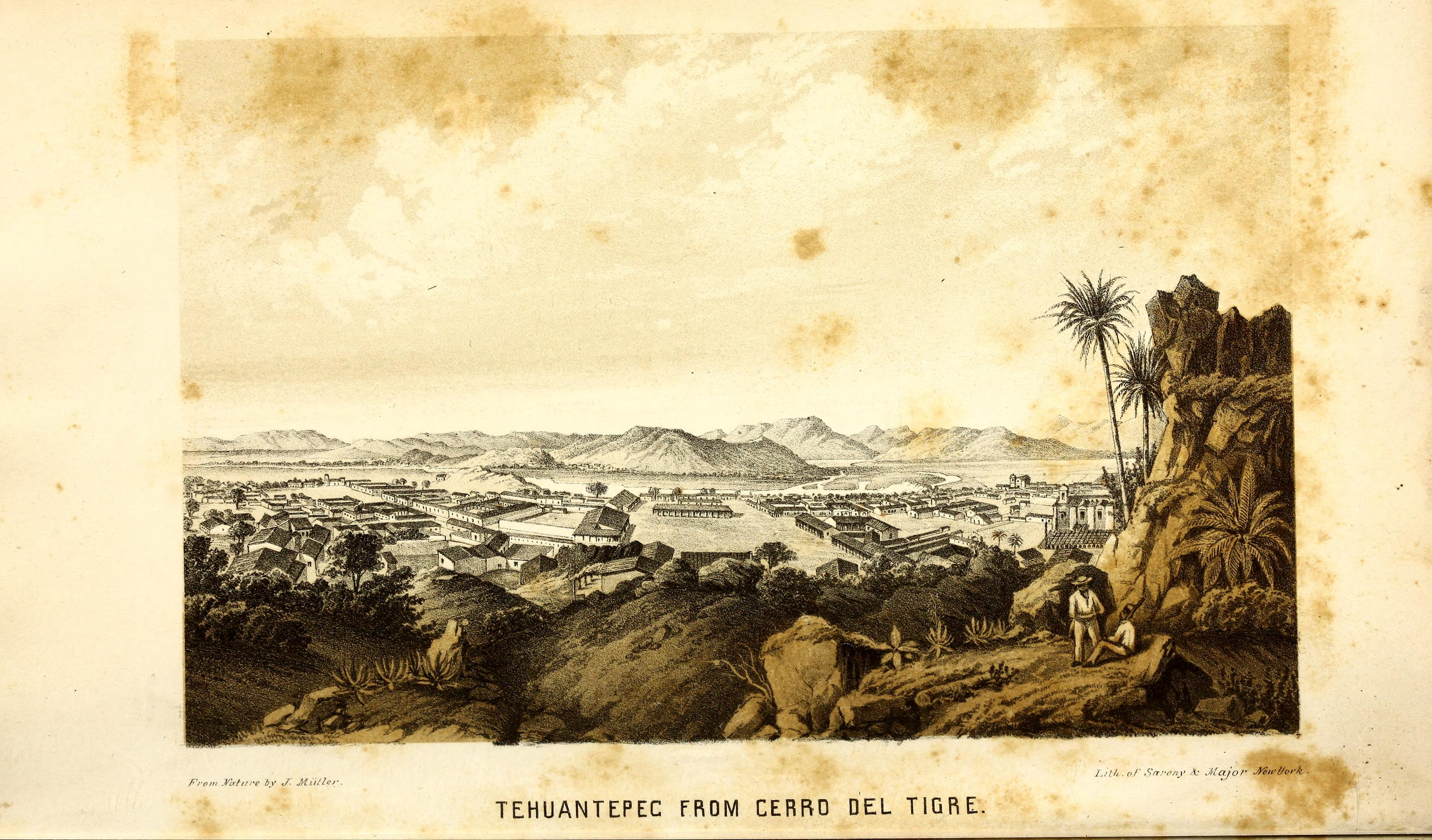
View of Tehuantepec from the Barnard survey, in the early 1850s

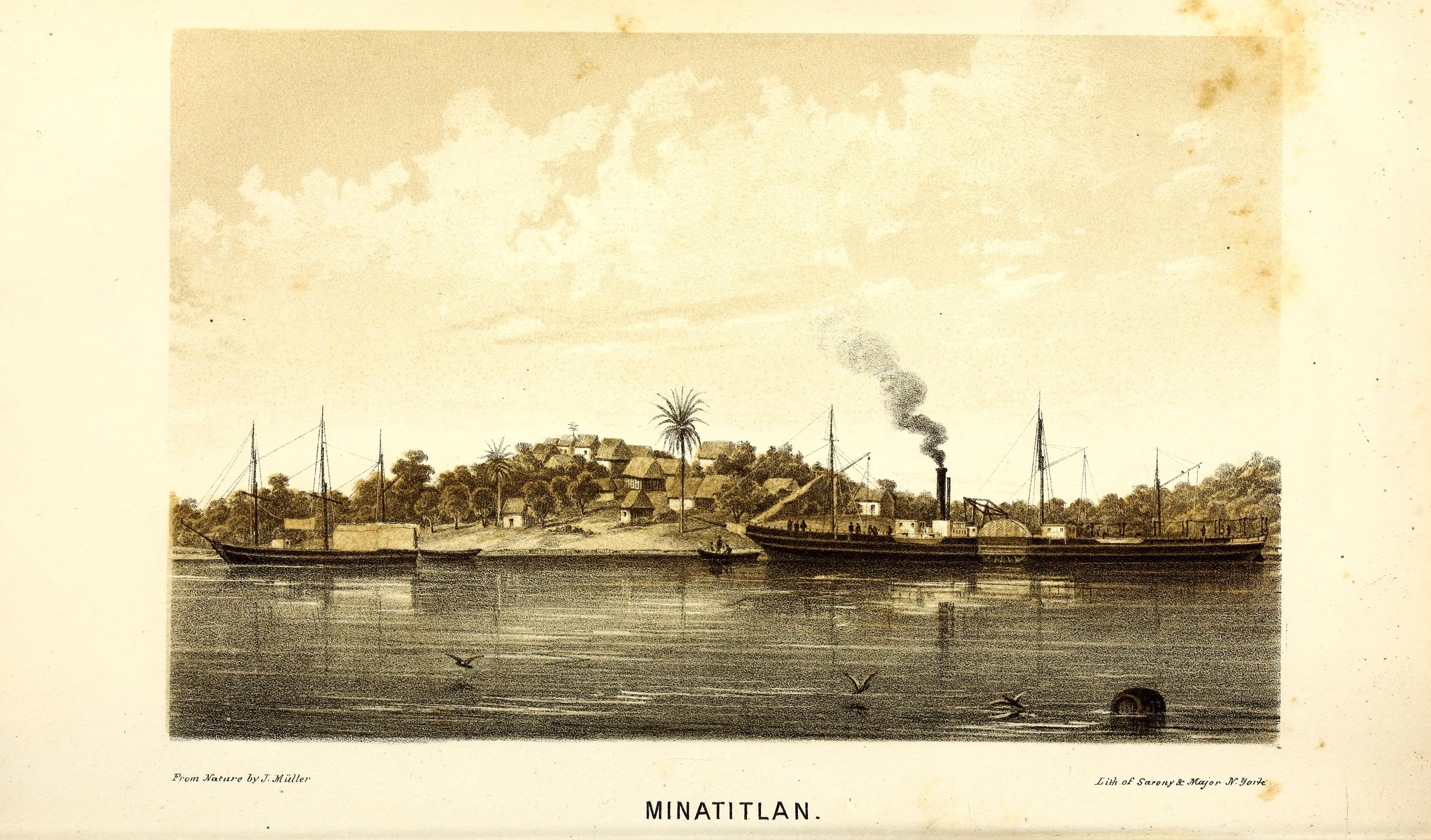
Minatitlán, where the Coatzacoalcos river and village used to be, as viewed from the Barnard survey

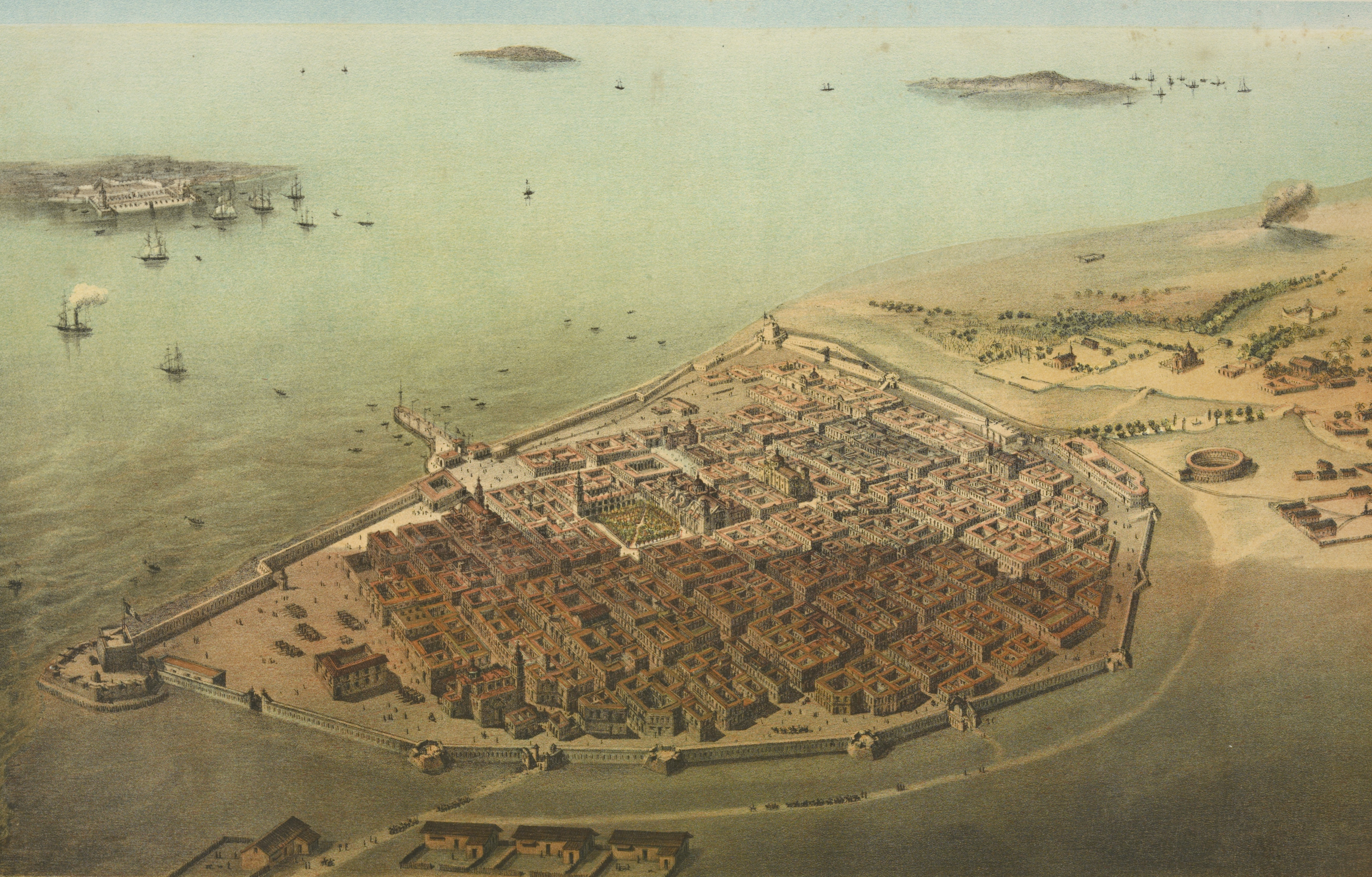
The city of Veracruz in the 1850s and 60s

In 1850, Hargous approached Judah P. Benjamin, a member of the Louisiana House of Representatives, to negotiate the purchase of the Garay grant with the New Orleans businessmen. Benjamin and the businessmen formed The Tehuantepec Railroad Company of New Orleans (TRCNO), of which Benjamin became chairman, which would later become known as the Louisiana Tehuantepec Company. Hargous gave the company a $500,000 loan and the company sought to raise $9 million in capital. The Mexican government became aware of the deal with the New Orleans company on December 30, five days after Major John G. Barnard, lead engineer of the U.S. survey team composed of 54 engineers, arrived at the river mouth of Coatzacoalcos, Minatitlán. However, the Mexican government had doubted the validity of Garay's concession for some time: in March 1849, after Manning's futile attempt to demonstrate that works for the construction of the interoceanic line had been active, the government declared that Garay's concession had expired in November of the previous year, a declaration which the British firms protested against since March until they handed the issue over to Hargous in July, when they informed the government that the business had permanently established itself in the U.S.

The situation would get more complicated henceforth. Hargous, soon after purchasing the Garay grant, promoted the advantages of the Tehuantepec route to the U.S. Senate and asked for diplomatic support. This resulted in the U.S. Ambassador to Mexico Nathan Clifford, as instructed by U.S. Secretary of State John M. Clayton, addressing a threatening note to the Mexican government to not annull the Garay concession based solely on it being possessed by a U.S. citizen, stating that "If such should be the fact, the measure could not fail to be regarded by the President of the United States as proof of a disposition wholly at variance with the existing pacific relations between the two countries." In an attempt to cool tensions, a treaty to guarantee the right of Hargous was negotiated in September 1849 between Ambassador Robert P. Letcher, under orders of Secretary Clayton, and former Mexican President Manuel Gómez Pedraza, who was commissioned by President José Joaquín de Herrera for this purpose. This treaty was ultimately signed on 22 June 1850, though with some changes that ensured the neutrality of the route and limited U.S. intervention. While this did not completely break relations between the U.S. entrepreneurs and the Mexican government, it foreshadowed the diplomatic tensions which would ultimately cause the project's failure. Despite the tensions, the company started making preparations for their own survey of the isthmus in April 1850, soon after the company's formation. In June, despite it being the rainy season in the isthmus, a local engineer named Peter E. Trastour was sent to the Pacific Coast to conduct a survey, delivering his preliminary report in October despite facing much hardship. In December, Major John G. Barnard, whose services had been offered to the company by U.S. President Zachary Taylor (prior to his death in July), was sent with his own survey team. Barnard's team found that "no difficulties exist in the way of constructing a railroad over those divisions which lie on either side of the dividing ridge" and that the survey's results "will satisfy the most skeptical that the project of constructing a railroad or transit route to connect the two oceans, is not only eminently feasible, but practicable." Additionally, due to the distance saved while traveling to the American West Coast from New Orleans, New York or England, the report claims that it "is therefore plain that the superiority of Tehuantepec over all other routes is immeasurably great."

However, the aggressivity of the U.S. Secretary of State Daniel Webster would create a diplomatic disaster in January 1851. He demanded the Mexican government to give the U.S. Military more freedom to intervene in the isthmus in the interest of U.S. citizens. The newly elected Mexican President Mariano Arista countered these demands claiming that no agreement would be reached if the U.S. did not recognize Mexico's right to choose who operates on the isthmus and under what conditions they could do so. U.S. President Millard Fillmore attempted to cool tensions, and a treaty was drawn which attempted to find a middle ground between the U.S. demands and Mexican defense. Though the resulting treaty "was virtually the same as that of June 22, 1850", the terms of the treaty were well approved by Hargous and the U.S. Congress, but not in the Mexican Congress, which proceeded to investigate the validity of the Garay concession, against the desires of Hargous and Webster. U.S. diplomats had already acknowledged since the negotiations of September 1849 that the treaties developed between the U.S. and Mexico regarding the Isthmus of Tehuantepec had little to no chance of being ratified by the Mexican Congress, as they acknowledged that the Mexican press was "violently opposed" to them, and by April it was reported that "there was not a member of the cabinet who favored it [the new treaty]", according to professor J. Fred Rippy, as Mexicans feared their country would end up ceding more territory to the U.S. The Mexican Senate came to the conclusion that the Garay concession was illegal because it was given under a provisional government and wasn't submitted for approval to Congress before April 1845, thus the New Orleans company had to obtain a concession of its own if it wished to continue the project. As Hargous responded to this with hostility, on 15 May 1851, Benito Juárez, then governor of Oaxaca and future president of Mexico, commanded for all United States citizens in the state to be detained under orders of President Arista, who then proceeded against the engineers of the Barnard survey, ordering them to leave the country immediately. The project had been terminated.

==== Further attempts from Louisiana (1853–1861) ====
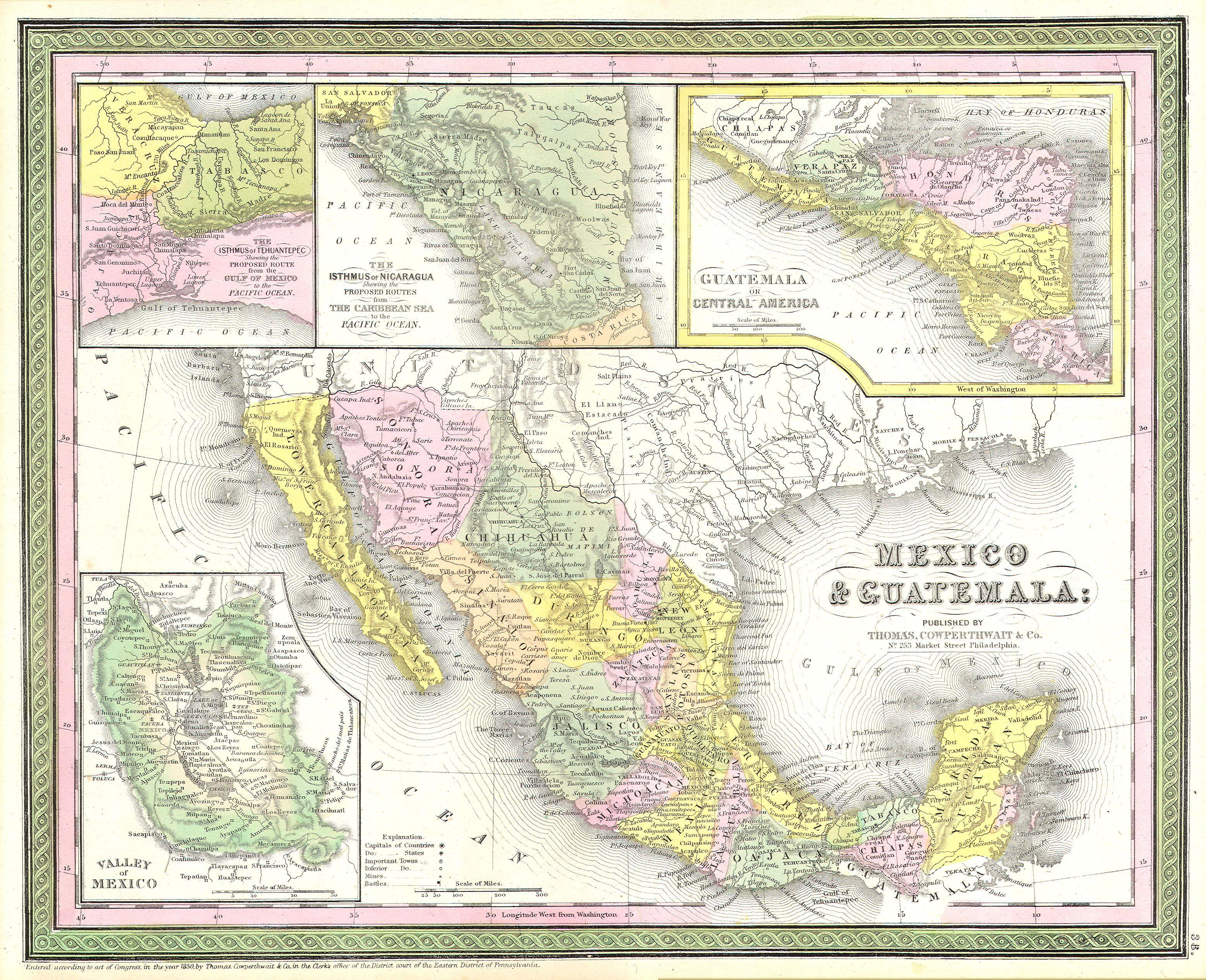
1850 map of Mexico and Central America, featuring the proposed interoceanic route for the Isthmus of Tehuantepec at the top-left

Despite the termination of the TRCNO project and the tensions with the U.S. government, the Arista administration still sought to create the interoceanic line of the Isthmus of Tehuantepec. Thus, Congress passed a legislation two weeks after dismissing the Garay grant, in May 1852, for the president to "find and promote a Mexican-based company to develop transportation on the isthmus." He, therefore, called for companies to submit proposals, and he would then offer a concession to the company with the most suitable project proposed. Various firms, belonging to both national and foreign businessmen, presented different projects in hopes of obtaining the concession. National companies such as Felipe García y Compañía, as an example, submitted a project focused on internal construction and navigation rather than international traffic, proposing the construction of a highway and railway line, asking for a grant of uncultivated land to take care of and feed draft animals and planning to hire foreigners (only the "strictly necessary") to administer the construction. As an example of a submission from a foreign-owned business, Jonas Phillips Levy, a U.S. citizen residing at Veracruz, proposed forming a company called Compañía del Canal del Pacífico (Company of the Canal of the Pacific), of which he would have been president, which would have built an isthmian communication line via a canal or railway, as well as it would have established a police force for the region, among other proposed projects. Ultimately however, the concession was given to the project proposed by Albert G. Sloo (an American who had previously established a postal service through the Isthmus of Panama), obtaining it on 5 February 1853 after some initial trouble which was solved after the incorporation of Sloo and a group of Mexican investors, forming the Mixed Company.

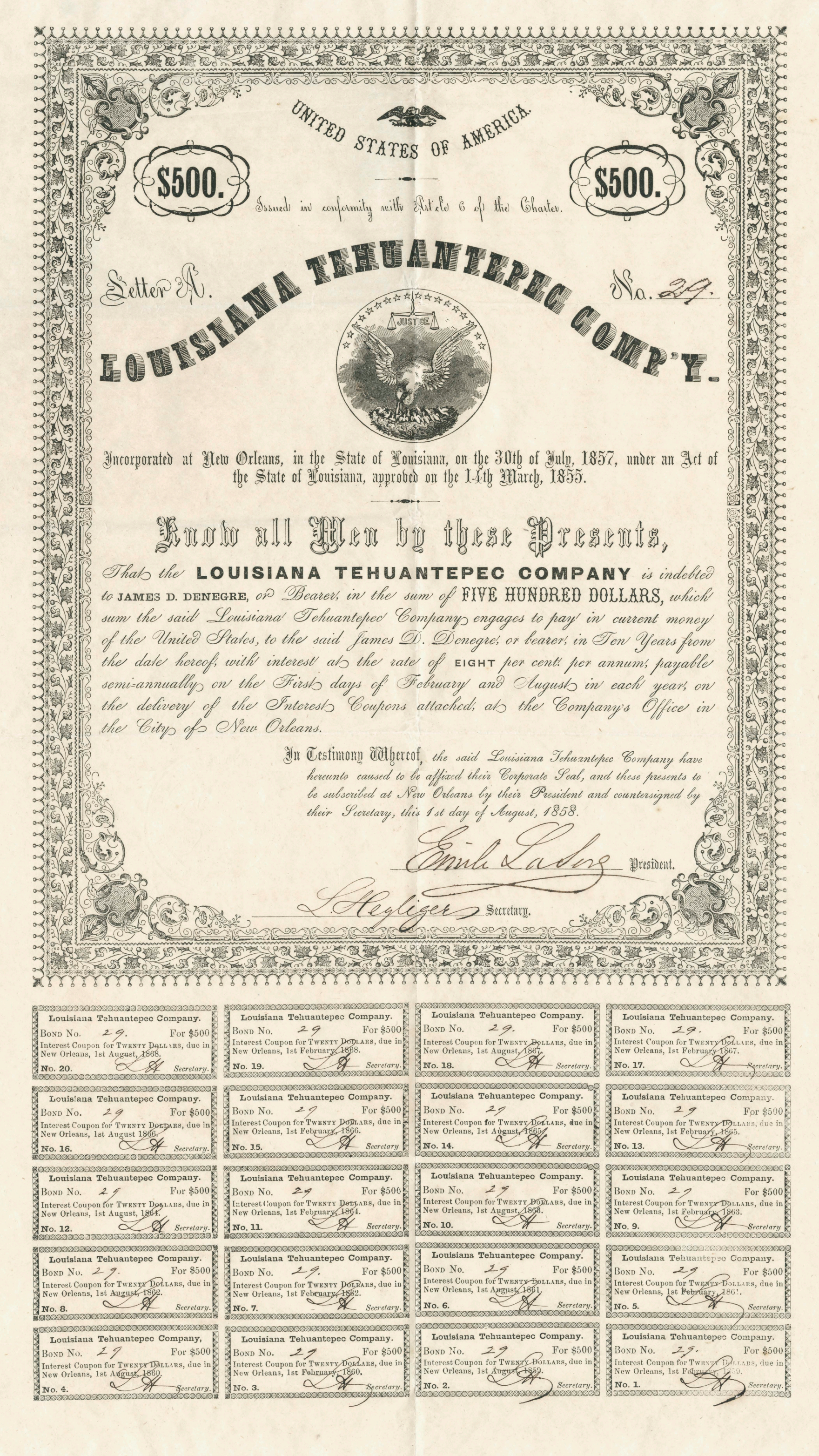
Bond issued on 1 August 1858 by the Louisiana Tehuantepec Company

During the course of the Reform War, a civil war in Mexico fought between Conservatives and Liberals, both parties claimed the presidency of the country. The Conservatives supported General Miguel Miramón, who assumed the presidency upon establishing himself in Mexico City on 2 February 1859, while the Liberals supported Benito Juárez, whose government settled itself at Veracruz on 4 May 1858 (departing from the Port of Manzanillo, on the Pacific coast, and reaching the Gulf of Mexico through Panama). Both governments attempted to obtain international recognition to claim legitimacy, as Miramón was unable to launch a successful campaign onto the Gulf of Mexico to decisively defeat the Liberals. When U.S. President James Buchanan sent Robert Milligan McLane to Veracruz, who arrived on April 1, to establish diplomatic relations with the best suited party, he was given instructions from Secretary of State Lewis Cass to negotiate a treaty to purchase Baja California, if possible, and the American right to use the Isthmus of Tehuantepec "in perpetuity" and Northern Mexico for military and commercial transportation for $10 million. Both the U.S. government, as Cass explained to McLane, and the Louisiana Tehuantepec Company sympathized with Juárez's government. The Company's president Emile La Sére had, in fact, persuaded him to recognize Juárez's legitimacy, and Buchanan also explained he was not willing to recognize Miramón. After McLane established communication throughout the following days with Melchor Ocampo, the Liberal Secretary of Foreign Affairs, the U.S. recognized Juárez's government and began negotiating the planned treaty (though "President Juarez [sic], with singular determination, refused to cede a foot of territory, whatever might be the consequences", according to McLane himself), to the disdain of the Conservatives, who proceeded to denounce in the press any agreement reached between the Liberals and the U.S., accusing the Liberals of working for their own profit at the expense of their country. The Conservative government, likewise, referred to the treaty's negotiators as "traitors to the nation", manifesting their discontent to France and the United Kingdom, even asking for military intervention to the Emperor of the French Napoleon III, an event which would eventually contribute to the beginning of the Second Franco-Mexican War in the following decade.

The Liberals suffered a series of significant losses during the period of negotiations, including Tacubaya just days after McLane's arrival, and the Conservatives held strong influence by the end of 1859 in areas such as Aguascalientes, Zacatecas and San Luis Potosí. These losses might have contributed to Juárez being more willing to give in to U.S. interests during the negotiations. After months of negotiations, the Treaty of Transit and Commerce, also known as the McLane–Ocampo Treaty, was signed on 14 December 1859. Under its clauses, the U.S. was to pay only $4 million (half of which was "to be retained to cover claims of U.S. citizens against Mexico"), an amount significantly smaller than what the U.S. had previously offered, for the right to freely use various railways or other forms of transportation across Mexico, including the Isthmus of Tehuantepec from ocean to ocean, and "to protect, by force of arms if necessary, all these transit routes, if Mexico failed to do so." The terms of the treaty displeased even some of Juárez's supporters, causing several officers of the national guard to resign. Ultimately, despite the controversial concessions Mexico gave in the treaty that benefited the U.S., it failed to be ratified by the U.S. Senate, to Buchanan's regret, largely due to the political division between the Southern and Northern states which eventually led to the American Civil War. The exact circumstances of this are somewhat debated, though it is widely believed that the conflict between protectionists and supporters of free trade, as well as the Southern advocates of actual annexation of Mexican territory, were significant in the failure of the treaty's ratification. It is also possible the 1860 U.S. presidential election and the instability of Juárez's government were involved to some degree in the discussion. Despite that neither nation received anything from the treaty, U.S. support toward Juárez's government played an important role within the months following the signing of the treaty, as on 8 February 1860, Miramón set out from the capital in an attempt to launch a naval attack on Veracruz using two recently purchased ships from Havana, Cuba. Juárez's government declared these ships as pirates, and were intercepted by two U.S. ships on March 6, acting as ordered by their government. The Conservative naval force was defeated in the subsequent battle and the prisoners were taken to New Orleans. Miramón was thus forced to return to the capital now that his troops had no naval support, and the Conservatives started to suffer a military decline which eventually led to their defeat.

The terms of the treaty have remained controversial in Mexican society, over a century after it was signed. Mexicans continue to believe it almost led to key territories of their country being given away to the U.S. When Mexico started debating in the 1990s, during the presidency of Ernesto Zedillo, on turning the Isthmus of Tehuantepec into a major trade route once more, the controversy would resurface since Mexicans feared the project would be largely dependent on the U.S. and would fall into the control of foreign companies, which for some meant "a part of our national territory would fall into private hands." While discussing the new project, politicians directly compared the government's plan with the treaty.

==== Other projects ====
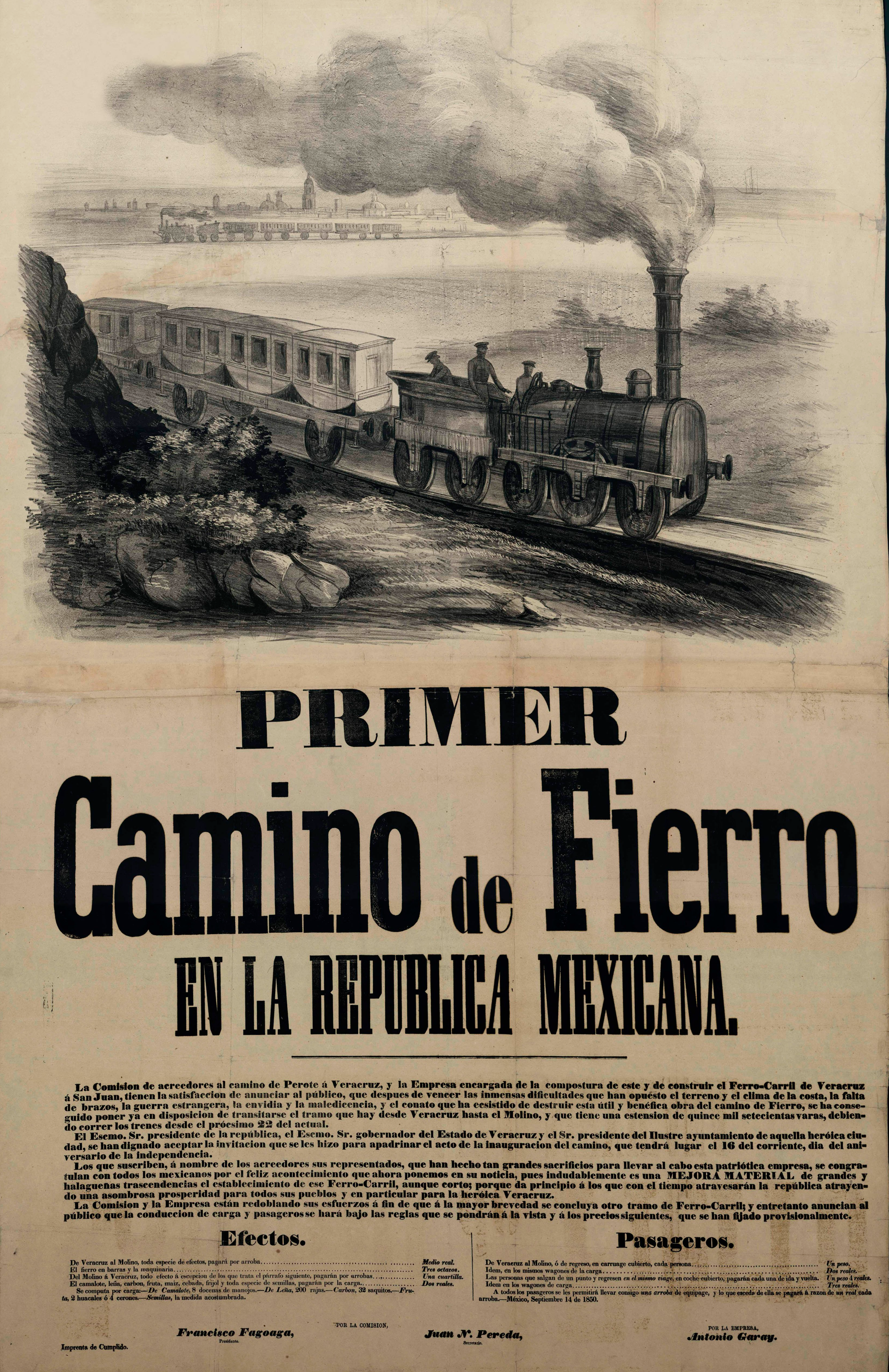
Advertisement from 1850 for the Veracruz–San Juan line, Mexico's first railway, which would later be used to connect Mexico City with the port

On 31 May 1842, nearly 2 months after Garay received his concession, López de Santa Anna authorized the committee of creditors in charge of maintaining the road between Perote, Veracruz, and the port to build a railway to connect the port with the river of San Juan. This railway, 11.5 km (7.1 mi) long, built with the assistance of Belgian personnel and using English materials, was inaugurated on 16 September 1850, making it Mexico's first ever completed railway. In 1853, the government would offer another concession to British subject John Laurie Rickards to build a railway between Mexico City and Veracruz, though the concession was invalidated about two years later and a concession was given to the Masso brothers, on 2 August 1855, to build a railway from Acapulco to San Juan, passing through Mexico City. On 4 July 1857, under President Ignacio Comonfort, the line from Mexico City to Villa de Guadalupe was inaugurated, which would form part of the Mexico City–Veracruz line the government had been attempting to create for nearly two decades by this point. Works were suspended shortly thereafter and the concession was given on August 31 to a businessman from Orizaba named Antonio Escandón, who also purchased the Veracruz–San Juan line.

Works to build the Mexico City to Veracruz line officially began late in that year. In spite of facing great difficulties over the following years, due to the War of Reform and the Second Franco-Mexican War, the Mexico City–Veracruz line was finally inaugurated in January 1873, under President Sebastián Lerdo de Tejada, who assisted the ceremony, concluding nearly 36 years of work to finish the line that would connect the capital with the most important port in the country for international commerce. This railway became known as Ferrocarril Mexicano, the predecessor to the Tehuantepec Railway built under President Porfirio Díaz, which would lay the foundation for the Interoceanic Corridor.

=== The Tehuantepec Railway and later projects ===
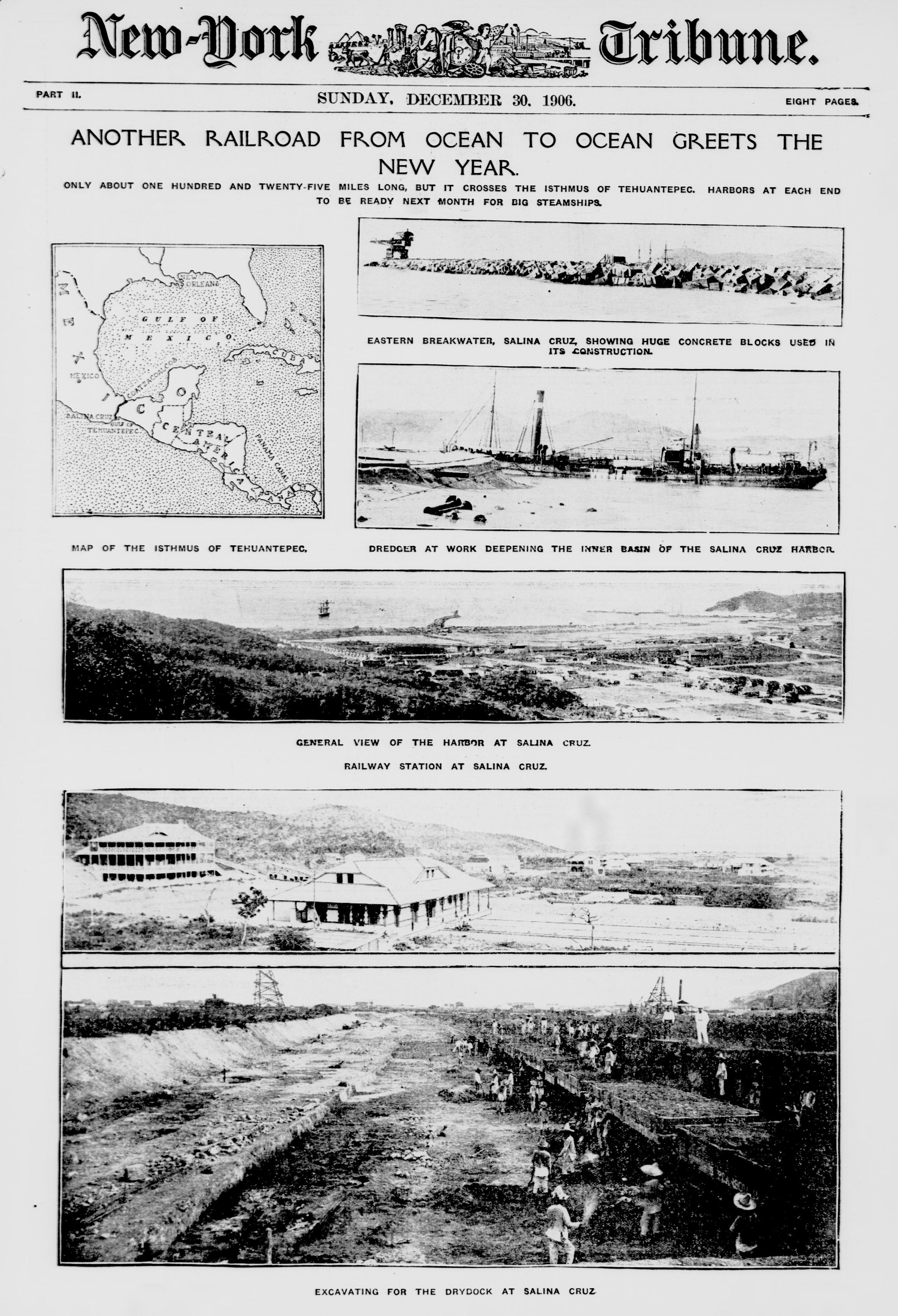
New-York Tribune report on the soon-to-be inaugurated Tehuantepec Railway

Despite the failure of the previous attempts and controversial events surrounding the usage of the site, businesses and the government continued to show their interest in the creation of a communication line between the two oceans through the narrow isthmus, and so, during the presidency of Porfirio Díaz, himself a man from Oaxaca, the project of a railway in the Isthmus of Tehuantepec would start to get shape, this time insuring the neutrality of the passage and that the Mexican nation would preserve its sovereignty, now that it enjoyed political stability and had a strong standing army, which was respected internationally due to its victories during the country's wars against Spain and France. Under previous administrations, the construction of Mexican railways had been largely inefficient, as nearly all Mexican railways, with the exception of the Ferrocarril Mexicano, were limited to small lines, as many concessions expired due to results remaining undelivered. Díaz sought to combat this issue through "very liberal" concessions which resulted in most of Mexico's current railway lines being built.

In 1878, an American company formed by a man named Edward Learned proposed being in charge of the construction of the railway, starting it in the year 1880, but due to considerable delays in its construction—just building 35 km (22 mi) in about two years, less than the agreed amount—the contract expired in August 1882. The task was then given to a man named Deflín Sánchez, who managed to build 76 km (47 mi) by April 1888, but there were still two thirds yet to be built. A contract was then given to Edward McLurdo, but he died before the contract could be carried out. The agreement, however, was taken by his widow in January 1892. In February, the government made an agreement with a firm of three contractors, Hampson, Chandos S. Stanhope and Corthell. It was originally planned for them to finish the railway by September 1893, but due to a lack of funds they were unable to do so. However, in December a new contract with Stanhope was signed to finish the work in nine months.

The Railway was completed in 1894, its first train passing through it in September of that year in a ten-hour long trip, starting at Coatzacoalcos at 6 in the morning and finishing at Salina Cruz at 4 in the afternoon. It officially opened in 1895. However, its quality was insufficient for interoceanic traffic, so the Railway couldn't be used to link the oceans yet. In 1896, a private English company was authorized to be contracted to finish the construction of the Railway, S. Pearson & Son, Ltd., (today known as Pearson plc, then a construction company) owned by Sir Weetman Pearson, Bt, which already had experience in infrastructure in Mexico, having built Mexico City's sewage system before. This would be done, however, with intervention and participation from the Mexican government. The company would be in charge of modernizing the railways, the building of a telegraph system, two new ports; Salina Cruz, Oaxaca, to open up to the Pacific Ocean, and Coatzacoalcos, Veracruz, to the Atlantic; and of maintenance and administration.

Films by Salvador Toscano showing the inauguration of the Tehuantepec Railway and views of the isthmus and its people

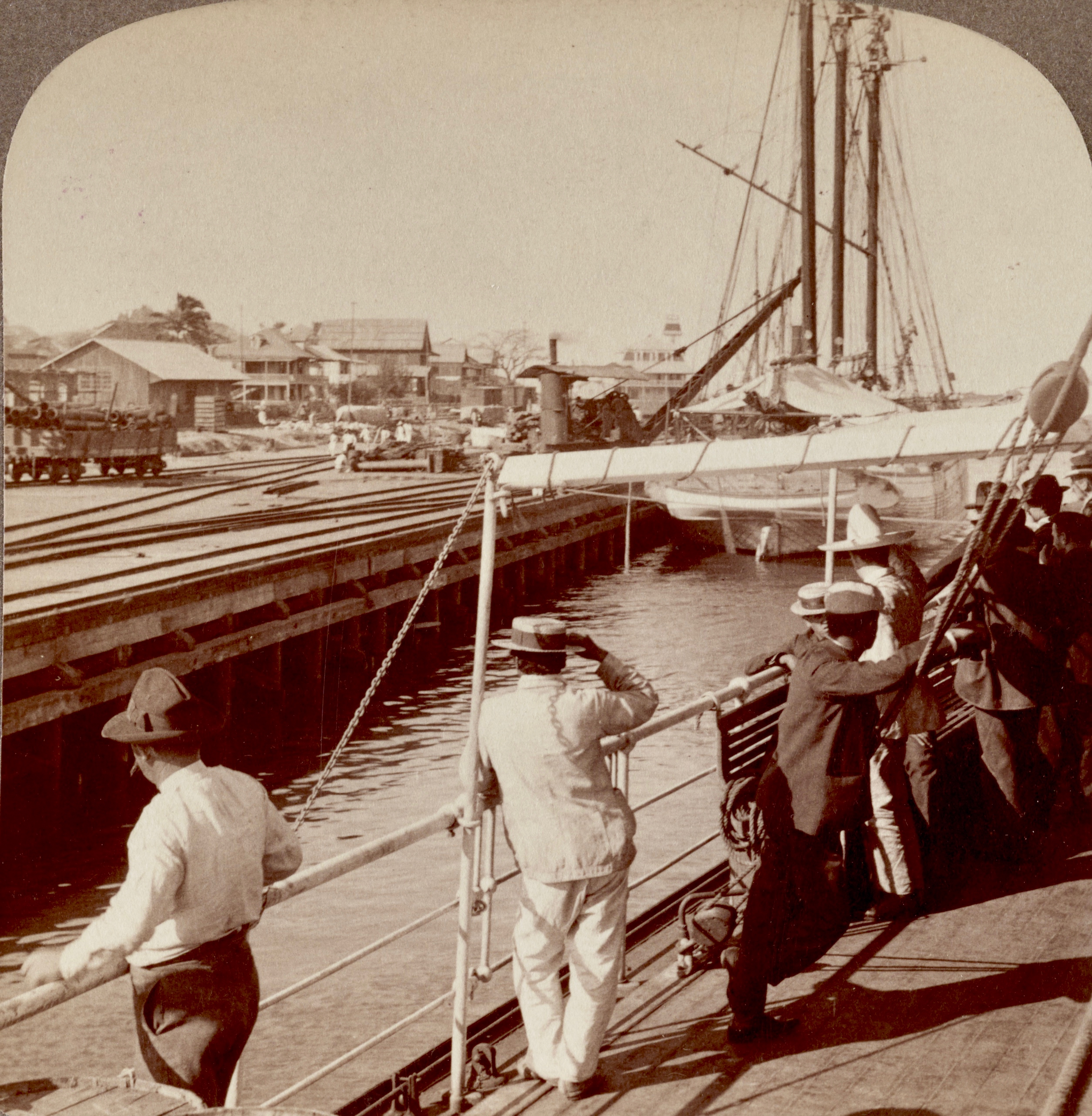
Ships at the newly inaugurated port of Coatzacoalcos, 1907

Finally, on 23 January 1907 the Railway, along with the ports of Salina Cruz and Coatzacoalcos, were inaugurated by President Díaz, the inauguration being celebrated with the transportation of 11,500 tons of sugar from Hawaii from the USS Arizonan (not to be confused with the USS Arizona (BB-39)), followed by two Japanese ships. Up until that point, the American-Hawaiian Steamship Company had been using the Strait of Magellan to transport cargo from New York City to Honolulu and other ports in the Pacific. It then had signed a contract ensuring 500,000 tons of sugar to be transported through the Tehuantepec Railway. For the first six years, the Railway seemed to be highly successful, and provided a significant economic boost to Mexico. Throughout that period, it transported over 850 thousand tons of cargo across the two oceans. Throughout the construction of the railway the towns in the isthmus area enjoyed considerable economic growth, to the point that the cities of Tehuantepec and Juchitán de Zaragoza had a larger economically active population in 1890 than the national average, only surpassed by the Distrito Federal (today known as Mexico City). In addition, Coatzacoalcos transitioned from a small village of fishermen within Minatitlán to its own municipality in 1881.

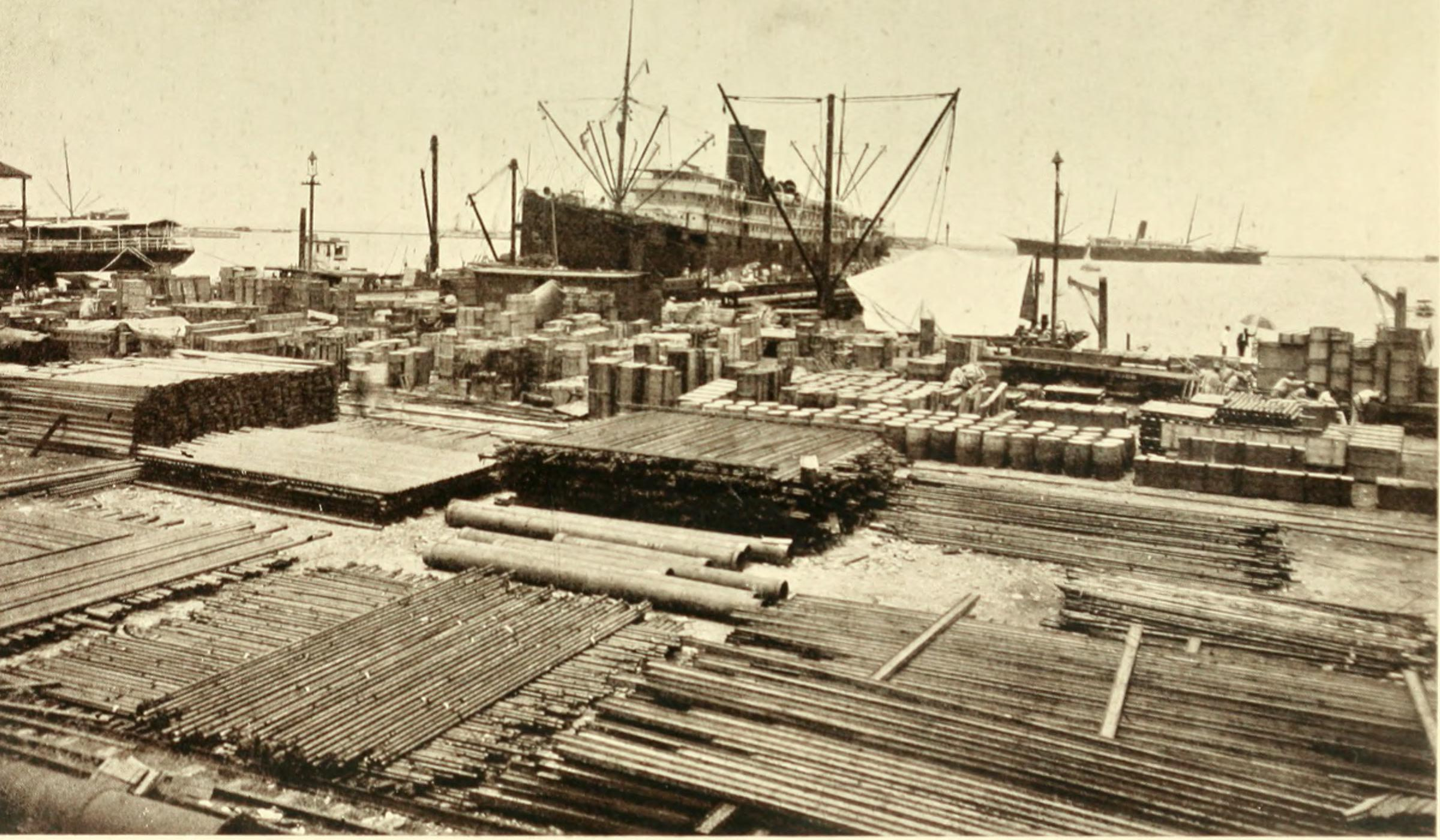
The port of Veracruz in 1909

However, this success was only temporary, as the usage of the Railway began to plummet in 1914, when the Panama Canal was officially opened. Due to the profits made out of the shipment of products from New York to Honolulu or any other port in the Pacific, American businesses found it much more convenient to not let that business fall into the hands of the English or the Mexican government, thus they quickly started to go through Panama instead, driving away the Railway's main source of profit. In that year, the cargo of the Railway fell by a third, and in the following year by 77%. In addition, a few years earlier, in 1910, Mexico became engulfed in its largest civil war in history, the Mexican Revolution. Railways across the country started to be used almost exclusively for war, the Tehuantepec being used, as its usage plummeted, to transport Carrancista revolutionary troops and oil for ships.

During the presidency of Ernesto Zedillo, in the 1990s, a plan was made to modernize the ports of Lázaro Cárdenas and Coatzacoalcos, and to build a highway and railway between the two, but due to budget issues the plan was never executed. Plans to develop the economy of the Mexican South have been made since then. Under the administration of Enrique Peña Nieto, a plan was made to develop the economy through the creation of seven areas known as Special Economic Zones (Zonas Económicas Especiales, "ZEE" by its initials in Spanish and "SEZ" in English), but, as the project kept being postponed until 2017, the penultimate year of his presidency, little could be done regarding this. This project also came under criticism for a lack of budget for the infrastructure, for being "too ambicious" (though the current Corridor project has been found to be equally as ambitious), for its Zones being vulnerable to dispersion, among other reasons, though it did attract a certain degree of investment which would've produced several thousands of jobs. Though many Mexican Presidents have had plans to start building the Corridor again, this would not occur until the beginning of the presidency of Andrés Manuel López Obrador in 2018, who, as a man from the southern state of Tabasco, made the development of the Mexican South a priority of his government. In March 1995, the private sector became allowed through a constitutional amendment to participate in the provision of railroad services. In 1999, the state-owned company Ferrocarril del Istmo de Tehuantepec, S.A. de C.V., (FIT) was founded to operate the railway that connects Salina Cruz with the locality of Medias Aguas, Veracruz. Through this company, the construction of the modern Corridor would be made.

=== The modern Corridor ===
A project was presented on 23 December 2018, called "Program for the Development of the Isthmus of Tehuantepec", with the purpose of "developing the economy of the region respecting its history, culture and traditions", with Rafael Marín Mollinedo, who would later be assigned as the first director of the Corridor, being in charge of the project, proposing the creation of the Corridor, then known as the Interoceanic Multimodal Corridor (Corredor Multimodal Interoceánico).

The Corridor project started development in 2019, with the purpose of developing the economy and infrastructure of the area of the Isthmus of Tehuantepec in the Mexican South, which had faced social and economic stagnation for decades due to "inadequate public policies, official disinterest and decades-long exclusion of the public investment budgets, which lead to disinterest from private investment to the development of the region and its subsequent stagnation and deterioration", as the first official report of the project stated, on September 17 of that year. The Corridor project was officially created on 14 June 2019, according to the decree published in the Official Journal of the Federation on that day, as a decentralized public organization. Ten days after its official creation, López Obrador assigned Rafael Marín Mollinedo as the first general director of the project.

In that same year, in April, López Obrador officially cancelled the project of the Special Economic Zones, under the statement that it failed to fulfill its promised benefits, despite that it had a relatively promising development in 2018. However, as Baker Institute researcher Adrian Duhalt stated, the Corridor project has a wider range of impact than its predecessor, since it will cover an area of 79 municipalities in Veracruz and Oaxaca, while the SEZ only covered a handful of municipalities near Salina Cruz and Coatzacoalcos.

External videos
- Ceremony for the beginning of the rehabilitation of the Tehuantepec Railway held on 7 June 2020 at Sayula de Alemán, Veracruz, livestreamed on Andrés Manuel López Obrador's YouTube channel (in Spanish). Present at the ceremony were President López Obrador, Veracruz Governor Cuitláhuac García Jiménez, former CIIT director Rafael Marín Mollinedo, then Oaxaca Governor Alejandro Murat Hinojosa, FIT director José Sánchez Pérez, chief of the CIIT's Unit of Infrastructure and Transportation Herman Deutsch Espino and Sayula's Mayor Fredy Ayala González. Of these, García Jiménez, Murat Hinojosa, Marín Mollinedo and lastly López Obrador delivered a speech just prior to the beginning of the rehabilitation works.

Works for the rehabilitation of the Tehuantepec railway started in June 2020. It was reportedly expected that a cargo train would be able to move at a speed of 70 km/h (43 mph), increasing their speed from the prior 20 km/h (12 mph), and that passenger trains would be able to move at a speed of up to 100 km/h (62 mph). López Obrador later stated that passenger trains will actually move at a speed of up to 80 km/h (50 mph). According to the Fifth Government Report of the presidency of López Obrador, works for the modernization and expansion at the port of Salina Cruz through the construction of a breakwater started in January 2022.

According to the advancement report published on 14 February 2022 by the FIT on social media, amongst the activities that have been carried out for the modernization of the Tehuantepec Railway and the port of Salina Cruz are: the construction of the breakwater by pouring hundreds of thousands of tons of rock into the sea, the removal of old rail tracks, the distribution of basalt with the assistance of a work train, the replacement of old wooden sleepers and the application of exothermic welding to fix the tracks. In a controversial instance, in July 2023, it was announced that 200 trees would be cut down in the municipality of Salina Cruz for the construction of the Corridor, without offering much other information, at that time, about the business involved in the operation (later identified as ABCD ARQUITECTURA S.A. DE C.V., which is also responsible for the construction of the Coatzacoalcos railway station) or its environmental impact despite the requests of local communities, though the municipal council did agree to requests to spare some of the trees depending on their age, size and location, and to form a strategy to avoid massive deforestation. The process to cut these trees began on 8 August 2023, though reportedly the business involved "has made the environmental compensation, in accordance to the income law." The environmental impact of the Corridor has continued to be a source of concern for various communities in the isthmus region.

In late November 2022, Marín Mollinedo announced his intention to step down from his position as director of the CIIT, to become the head of the National Customs Agency of Mexico, a request which became effective before 15 December 2022. His replacement became Raymundo Pedro Morales Ángeles, vice admiral of the Mexican Navy who earned a degree in naval engineering in 1989, aside from decades of studies in both national and international institutions. He officially took this position on 5 January 2023. By decree, the CIIT has been under the control of the Mexican Secretariat of the Navy since March 2023.

On the early morning of 19 May 2023, with the permission of a presidential decree, the Mexican Armed Forces took control of 127 km (79 mi) of the railways belonging to Ferrosur, a company owned by the conglomerate Grupo México, in Veracruz, sparking controversy. This portion is vital for the creation of the Corridor, since it connects the locality of Medias Aguas with the port of Coatzacoalcos, completing the connection between the Pacific and Atlantic Oceans which the projects seeks to achieve. This event initially caused a dispute between Grupo México and the Mexican government. A few days after the event, various newspapers erroneously reported that the government accepted paying Grupo México 7 billion pesos in compensation, less than the 9.5 billion which the owner of Grupo México Germán Larrea Mota-Velasco had asked for, but this was denied by López Obrador on a morning press conference on May 24, stating that negotiations were continuing. On the night of May 31, this issue was resolved when the two parties reached an agreement. Under the agreement, instead of financially compensating the occupation, the concession of the railway, which possesses the occupied sections, in favor of Ferrosur granted by the government on 14 December 1998 will be extended by eight years so that it remains in force until the year 2056. According to Ferrosur, the FIT will be solely responsible for "the optimal safety conditions and the costs and expenses derived from the operation and maintenance of the track, slopes and yards in the aforementioned sections. We will only have to cover the fee corresponding to the right of way."

On 21 March 2023, director Morales Ángeles reported that the rehabilitation of the railway that connects Oaxaca and Veracruz had been 79% completed. The Fifth Government Report stated that by June 2023 the railway had an accumulated physical progress of 90%, while the breakwater of the port of Salina Cruz was at 30%. In late May 2023, the government declared that the Transisthmian Railway, one of the key elements of the project, has almost finished construction and estimated its inauguration at August or September 2023 and that will begin operating at full capacity in December, by which point the government expects to inaugurate all other infrastructural projects of the Corridor, as the governor of Oaxaca Salomón Jara Cruz stated on a press conference in late June.

On 6 September 2024, Morales Ángeles (who had ascended to the rank of admiral on 20 November 2023) was announced as the new Secretary of the Navy under the government of the soon-to-be president Claudia Sheinbaum, a position he would officially take on October 1. The still president-elect announced Vice-Admiral Juan Carlos Vera Minjares, who was in charge of the Unit of Infrastructure and Transportation of the Corridor, as his replacement on 30 September, just hours before Sheinbaum officially became the president of the country.

==== First tests ====
On 13 August 2023, the third day of a supervision tour through the Corridor, López Obrador was presented with the first locomotive of the Interoceanic Railway, which was named Tehuana. Later, on August 26, what was formerly a tourist train in Puebla was received in Veracruz to serve as a passenger train for the Corridor, as the government of Puebla shut down its services in 2022 due to the high costs of its maintenance and operation, having spent hundreds of millions of pesos from 2016 to 2021 only to return less than 5 million. On August 21, López Obrador stated that he expected the Salina Cruz—Coatzacoalcos passenger train line (Line Z) to be ready by September 17, while, as he announced on July 21, the Coatzacoalcos—Palenque line (Line FA) would be ready by the end of the year or, at its latest, in March 2024. Line FA's operations, however, have been delayed since then.

On 28 August 2023, the Corridor started its first test on the rehabilitated tracks, transporting 10 hoppers containing cement and 2 tanks of hydrofluoric acid from Medias Aguas to Salina Cruz. Crowds of locals gathered around the Tehuana with cheers and applause, as it was the first time the tracks had been used in over 25 years, since President Ernesto Zedillo privatized the railway sector, and as they expect for the Corridor to become an economic driver for their communities. On Saturday September 9, the passenger train was tested for the first time for a full interoceanic trip, from Coatzacoalcos to Salina Cruz, starting at 6:00 in the morning and arriving at its destination at 2:20 in the morning of the next day, with no issues reported at any point of the route. On 17 September 2023, President López Obrador made his first official trip on the Corridor's passenger train from Salina Cruz to Coatzacoalcos. He boarded the train along with the Governor of Oaxaca Salomón Jara Cruz, the Governor of Veracruz Cuitláhuac García Jiménez, and members of his cabinet, including the head of the Secretariat of the Navy José Rafael Ojeda Durán. López Obrador made a post on X (formerly Twitter) featuring a video showing gathered locals and construction workers cheering and applauding as he waves at them through a window. Political figures such as former Head of Government of Mexico City Claudia Sheinbaum and Governor Jara Cruz referred to the event as a historic moment. López Obrador arrived at Coatzacoalcos after a nearly 9-hour-long trip, exiting the Salina Cruz station at 10:35 and arriving at Coatzacoalcos at 19:30. Reportedly hundreds of citizens waited for his arrival for hours to welcome him.

On the morning press conference of the following day, general director Morales Ángeles offered details on the beginning of the Corridor's operations: according to the announcement, the Ixtepec, Oaxaca, to Ciudad Hidalgo, Chiapas, line (Line K) would be the last to begin operation, in July 2024. Passenger operations for Line FA would begin between December 2023 and March 2024. Passenger operations for Line Z, the interoceanic line, would begin in December 2023. Cargo operations for Line Z and Line FA officially began in September, "from this very moment" he claimed. However, works for Line FA and K were later delayed. On 24 January 2024, Ojeda Durán announced that Line FA would begin operations approximately in June 2024, and Line K in late September. Line FA, from Coatzacoalcos to Palenque, is meant to connect the Corridor with the Maya Train (Tren Maya), which travels throughout the Yucatan Peninsula.

On 14 October 2023, López Obrador made a second official trip through the Corridor, also accompanied by Ojeda Durán. He posted a video on X recorded during this trip in which he announced that the opening of the Corridor would take place on 22 December 2023, as a few technical details were yet to be polished. He also announced that the passenger train would move at a speed of up to 80 km/h (50 mph). The trip, from Coatzacoalcos to Salina Cruz, lasted 7 hours, about the same amount of time as a bus trip, though he stated in the video that the train would be faster. In a pilot program during Spring 2025, Hyundai moved 900 vehicles from Asia to the U.S. East Coast, using the 303-kilometer rail route connecting the Pacific Port of Salina Cruz to the Gulf Port of Coatzacaolcos.

==== Inaugurations ====
External videos
- Line Z's inauguration ceremony held on 22 December 2023 at Salina Cruz, Oaxaca, livestreamed on President López Obrador's YouTube channel (in Spanish). The livestream included the signing of agreements with private investors and with the Portuguese government, Guelaguetza dances traditional to the indigenous peoples of the Isthmus of Tehuantepec, and the speeches delivered by Secretary of the Navy Ojeda Durán and President López Obrador.

On 22 December 2023, passenger operations for Line Z were officially inaugurated. The inauguration ceremony in Salina Cruz—held shortly after the inauguration of the Maya Train, another flagship project of López Obrador's administration—was attended by various government officials, including the governors of Oaxaca, Veracruz and Tabasco, and military personnel, ambassadors from the United States and Portugal, and businessmen who collaborated with the project, both Mexican and foreign, including Mexican magnate Carlos Slim. During the ceremony, concessions and memorandums of understanding were signed between the Mexican government and private investors, as well as between the Mexican and Portuguese governments. José Rafael Ojeda Durán then proceeded to deliver a speech detailing the importance of the Corridor, a brief summary of its historical background, its goals and functionality. López Obrador lastly delivered a speech afterwards, further describing the Corridor's history since the 16th century, his satisfaction with the project, its collaboration with local communities and his expectations. After the ceremony, López Obrador and other attendees, including his son Gonzalo López Beltrán, the U.S. Ambassador to Mexico Ken Salazar, Carlos Slim and the governors of Oaxaca, Veracruz, Tabasco and Chiapas boarded the passenger train. They arrived at Coatzacoalcos after 8 hours, at 20:13.

However, the passenger line is not the main feature of the Corridor, since its primary objective is the transportation of cargo from ocean to ocean through the Isthmus of Tehuantepec. The Corridor is not yet completely ready for this purpose, since various works needed at the port of Salina Cruz are still under construction. The delays on the construction of the jetties of the new port, in fact, impeded the inauguration of the Salina Cruz breakwater on the day of Line Z's opening. On 26 February 2024, the inauguration of the Salina Cruz breakwater was held as announced by López Obrador on 13 February 2024. He promised, at the time of the announcement, that this project would "allow the arrival of enormous ships, the biggest kinds", referring to Post-Panamax ships, which are capable of carrying between 9,500 and 12,000 containers in one trip. Experts and the authorities of the port, however, disagree with the President's statement: an experienced naval shipping agent stated that "by itself, the western breakwater does not offer an incentive for Post-Panamax ships to arrive at Salina Cruz." The port's authorities agree with this statement, but claim that the breakwater is the "first step" into being capable of receiving such ships. The second stage, starting after the inauguration, will consist on the construction of a container terminal with specialized cranes and freight train entrance areas, as well as one or two mooring docks, each being at least 300 metres (980 ft) long. The port's administration contemplates an investment of $14 billion pesos for the construction of these works, three times the amount that was invested on the breakwater. During the breakwater's inauguration, López Obrador promised that the project would contribute to Mexico's economic partnership with the United States by enhancing commerce with the American East Coast.

On 4 July 2024, the Corridor's first freight service after the inauguration of Line Z was performed, carrying 13,500 tons of maize from Topolobampo, Sinaloa to Chinameca, Veracruz. The train traveled 269 kilometres (167 mi) from Salina Cruz to its destination, arriving after approximately 10 hours.

On 11 September 2024, the 310 km (190 mi) long Coatzacoalcos–Palenque Line (Line FA) was fully tested for the first time, and two days later, the line was officially inaugurated, in Teapa, Tabasco, by President López Obrador, accompanied by president-elect Claudia Sheinbaum, the Governor of Tabasco Carlos Manuel Merino Campos and governor-elect Javier May Rodríguez. The train they took arrived at Palenque at approximately 17:00.

On 21 November 2025, President Claudia Sheinbaum, along with Chiapas governor Eduardo Ramírez Aguilar and authorities of the Secretariat of the Navy, inaugurated the first phase of Line K, which is expected to be fully completed in June 2026. She inaugurated four new train stations located on this line: Tonalá, Chiapas; Arriaga, Chiapas; Chahuites, Oaxaca; and Juchitán, Oaxaca. Her travel from Tonalá to Ixtepec, Oaxaca, 175 km (109 mi) long (out of the 459 km (285 mi) total for the full line), took four hours to complete. She made a stop at Arriaga station, about 40 minutes after her departure from Tonalá, where she was received by a crowd of hundreds who gathered for her visit. There she announced that starting on the following day, November 22, people will be able to purchase tickets to travel to Ixtepec, and from there, to the rest of the isthmus.

== The corridor ==
According to the Institutional Program of the Interoceanic Corridor of the Isthmus of Tehuantepec, published by the Official Journal of the Federation on 3 July 2023, the area of the Isthmus of Tehuantepec is within 79 municipalities: 46 in Oaxaca and 33 in Veracruz, where a considerable portion of the population is Indigenous (57% self-identified and 30% Indigenous language speakers in the Oaxaca isthmus, and 25% self-identified with 7% Indigenous language speakers in the Veracruz isthmus). These municipalities were chosen for "their proximity to the Tehuantepec Isthmus Railway, cultural relevance, historical productive relations, their logistical relevance and productive potential to make the region competitive." According to the Program, 60% of the population of the isthmus lives in poverty, and 15.5% live in extreme poverty. In addition, in 2018, the six states with the highest poverty rates in Mexico were all in the South, including Veracruz and Oaxaca at spots 4 and 3 respectively, according to the CONEVAL. These poverty rates, in fact, worsened between 2008 and 2018, Veracruz's raising from 51.2% to 61.8% and Oaxaca's from 61.8% to 66.35%. It is within this area where the infrastructure for Corridor will be built.

=== Tehuantepec Isthmus Railway and ports ===
Line Z

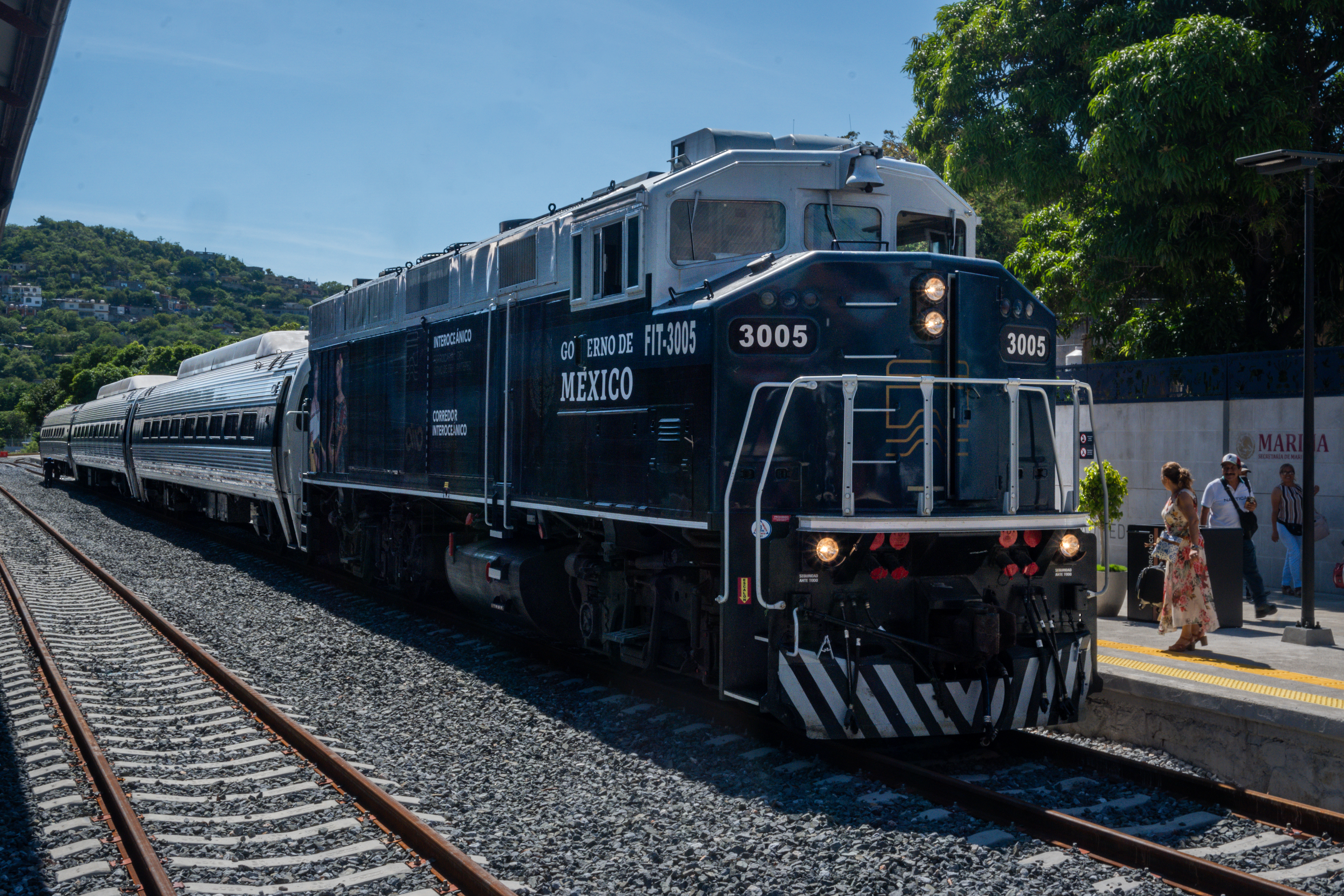
- Locomotive of the Isthmus of Tehuantepec Railroad at Salina Cruz station, Oaxaca, Mexico.

Overview
- Service type: Regional rail, freight rail
- Status: Operational
- Locale: Isthmus of Tehuantepec
- First service: September 2023 (freight); 22 December 2023 (passenger)
- Current operator: Ferrocarril del Istmo de Tehuantepec

Route
- Termini: Coatzacoalcos; Salina Cruz
- Stops: 10
- Distance travelled: 308 kilometres (191 mi)

Technical
- Rolling stock: See Tren Interoceánico § Rolling stock
- Track gauge: 4 ft 8 1/2 in (1,435 mm) standard gauge

One of the most vital operations for the Corridor project is the rehabilitation of various portions of the Tehuantepec Isthmus Railway built under President Porfirio Díaz, so as to be adapted for the Corridor's current needs: 227 km (141 mi) of railway, 82 bridges and 290 drainage works were rehabilitated for Line Z; 310 km (190 mi), 91 bridges and 680 drainage works will be rehabilitated for Line FA, which reported a general progress of 40% in October 2023; 459 km (285 mi), 526 bridges and 318 drainage works will be rehabilitated for Line K, which had a reported general progress of 5.5% in October 2023. As mentioned above, the rehabilitation is reportedly expected to result in a speed increase for trains using the railway, from 20 kilometres per hour (12 mph) to 70 km/h (43 mph) for cargo trains, and of up to 80 km/h (50 mph) for passenger trains, according to President López Obrador.

The railway will have three lines, the most essential being Line Z, of 212 km (132 mi) in length, which connects the port of Salina Cruz, Oaxaca, with the locality of Medias Aguas, Veracruz, thus allowing the port to connect with the port of Coatzacoalcos through the Ferrosur railways under the control of the Mexican government. Including these, Line Z reaches a length of 308 km (191 mi). Line K, 472 km (293 mi) long, will connect the cities of Ixtepec, Oaxaca, and Ciudad Hidalgo, Chiapas, reaching the Guatemala–Mexico border. Line FA is 328 km (204 mi) long and will connect the states of Veracruz, Chiapas and Tabasco, connecting with the Olmeca oil refinery at the port of Dos Bocas, Tabasco, and, through Palenque, Chiapas, with the Maya Train, in the Yucatán Peninsula, two of the most prominent megaprojects of López Obrador's presidency. In general, the Corridor will cover a distance of 303 km (188 mi) between the two ports.

The Tehuantepec Isthmus Railway is one of many railroad projects López Obrador has executed throughout his presidency. Under his administration, a large number of railroad projects had been made which he intended to finish before the end of his term in September 2024, with the goal of returning passenger trains to Mexico, which haven't been used in decades as Mexico's current railroads are used only for cargo (with the exception of El Chepe), a fact which he views as "irresponsible" as passenger trains continue to be functional in Europe and Asia.

As part of the project, a gas pipeline that crosses the isthmus, between the two ports, and a liquefied natural gas plant in Salina Cruz will be built, so as to solve the issue of the lack of natural gas supply in the Mexican South and to be able to export gas to Asia, as former director Rafael Marín Mollinedo stated, who deems the supply of natural gas as necessary for Mexican industrial development. It will also supply the 10 industrial parks planned to be built for the project with natural gas. The company Temura Service & Consulting S.C., contracted by the Federal Electricity Commission, will be in charge of its construction, and will have a cost of 19 billion Mexican pesos. López Obrador stated that these projects will generate three thousand jobs in the South. Another project in Salina Cruz is the creation of a delayed coking unit in the Antonio Dovalí Jaime oil refinery (also known as the Salina Cruz refinery), in order to turn residual oil left from the oil refining process into useful fuel and petroleum coke. Through this, it is projected to increase the refinery's daily gasoline production by 70 thousand barrels. It began construction in October 2022 and is projected to be inaugurated in October 2024, though its construction has undergone complications due to layoffs and delays due to funding issues. Reportedly, the government will invest 60 billion pesos on it.

The ports of Coatzacoalcos and Salina Cruz will both be modernized and expanded: in Coatzacoalcos, a new highway access is being built, along a railway access by the port precinct of Laguna de Pajaritos, and customs is being modernized to operate with more agility. In Salina Cruz, a new port with an access depth of 24 m (79 ft), a 1,600 m (5,200 ft) long breakwater and a 300 m (980 ft) wide mouth to receive ships with large drafts are being built. Raquel Buenrostro Sánchez, the Secretary of Economy, claimed that, due to the Corridor, the ports of Salina Cruz and Coaztacoalcos will become the largest ones in the country. As of May 2023, the largest ports in Mexico are Manzanillo, Colima, and Lázaro Cárdenas, Michoacán.

In an interview, on 30 October 2023, Morales Ángeles stated that the government had invested "a little over 70 billion pesos" on the corridor's infrastructure, including the rehabilitation of the three railway lines, the improvement of the ports of Coatzacoalcos, Salina Cruz, Port Chiapas and Dos Bocas, investments in highways and the rehabilitation of the Salina Cruz oil refinery.

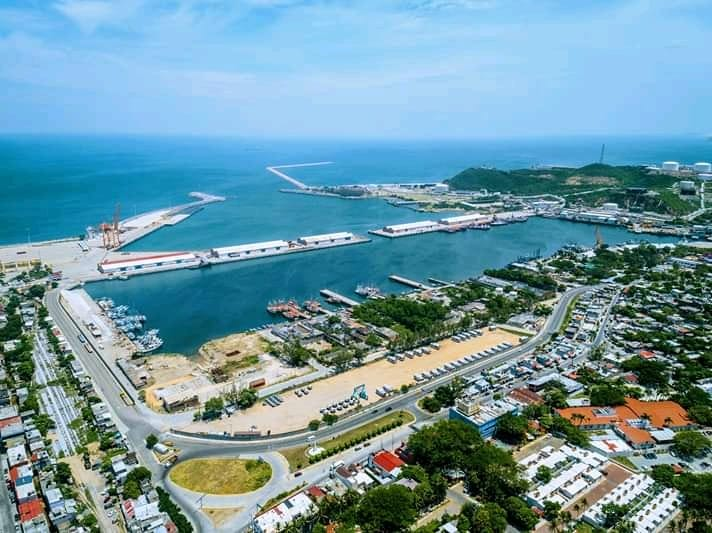
Docking site of the port of Salina Cruz, Oaxaca, in 2021.

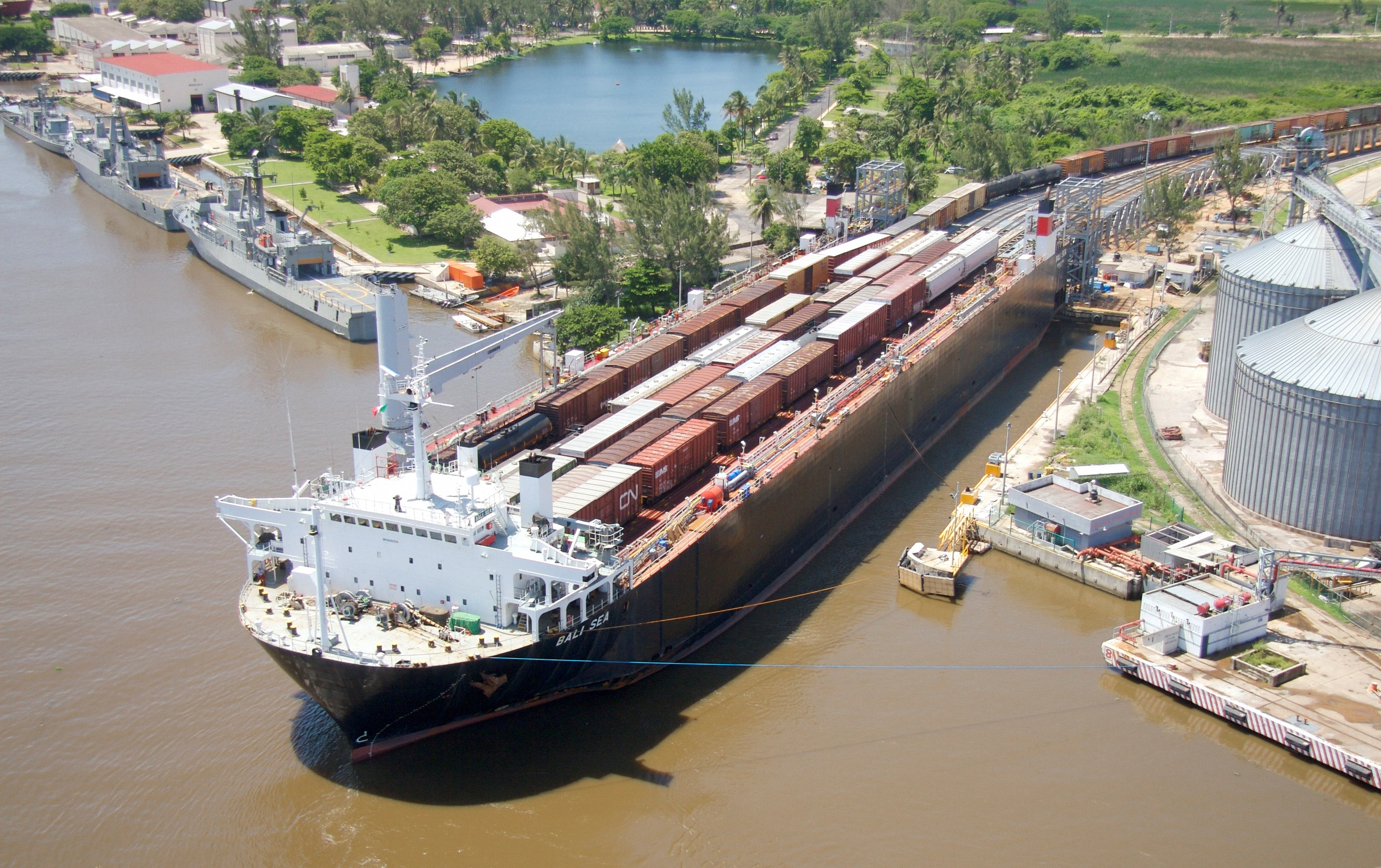
A cargo ship loading up with trains at the port of Coatzacoalcos, Veracruz, in 2007.

On 25 October 2023, the month following a meeting between President López Obrador and then Prime Minister of Portugal António Costa, the Mexican and Portuguese governments announced in the Global Gateway Forum held in Brussels, Belgium, their intention of creating a maritime corridor between the Mexican port of Coatzacoalcos and the Portuguese port of Sines. This corridor, according to the announcement, "will strengthen the production chains between both countries, as well as between North America and the European Union. As such, it will contribute to the exportation, storage and transshipment of energy", and it has the purpose of "bringing better security and predictability to international commerce." According to the Bank of Mexico, the country registered a trade deficit of US$467.2 million with Portugal throughout the first eight months of 2023, despite that the value of Mexican exports increased by 48.6% compared to the same period of the previous year. On 22 December 2023, during Line Z's inauguration, the Portuguese Secretary of State for Foreign Business and Cooperation Francisco Gonçalo Nunes André, and Jennifer Feller, on behalf of the Mexican Secretary of Foreign Affairs, signed a memorandum of understanding to establish the maritime corridor. The corridor "is expected to profoundly impact relations between Latin America and Europe", according to a news report.

=== Industrial parks ===
As part of the Corridor project, 10 industrial parks will be built in the isthmus area to encourage private investment. These parks will be installed in 10 areas referred to as Development Poles for Welfare (Polos de Desarrollo para el Bienestar, abbreviated as PODEBIS). Each of these parks will have a size of about 300 hectares (740 acres), and companies which choose to invest in them will be offered various tax benefits by the government: businesses that install a production plant in the Corridor will not pay an income tax for the first three years and will enjoy an income tax reduction of at least 50% and of up to 90% for the following three if they meet "certain job creation goals." They also will not pay a value-added tax throughout the four years following 6 June 2023, the day following the publication of the decree encouraging investment through these tax benefits. In addition to this, they will be guaranteed services of water, electricity and natural gas, as López Obrador declared on a press conference in May 2023.

The industrial parks have interested businesses both national and international, such as vehicle manufacturers (though these have expressed their desire for better infrastructure in the region), and various Taiwanese chip, semiconductor and electronic manufacturers. It was reported on 19 June 2023 that Mexican and foreign businesses had presented, by then, 52 projects for the construction of plants that represent an investment of US$4.5 billion. In late July, Raquel Buenrostro Sánchez, the Secretary of Economy, estimated that the first five Development Poles which were declared will sum a private investment of US$7 billion; she stated that the businesses which have contacted the Secretariat offer, on average, US$1 billion in investment.

On 11 May 2023, the government reported the details of six of the ten Development Poles for Welfare, officially declaring them open the following day. On 11 October 2023, three more Poles were declared, and on 16 October 2023 the tenth Pole was declared.

- In Oaxaca:
  - Salina Cruz, 82 ha (200 acres), 3 km (1.9 mi) from Line Z of the Tehuantepec Isthmus Railway, 8 km (5.0 mi) from the port, 36.8 km (22.9 mi) from Ixtepec Airport. (16°14′15″N 95°11′08″W)
  - San Blas Atempa, 331 ha (820 acres), 4.7 km (2.9 mi) from Line Z, 25 km (16 mi) from the port of Salina Cruz, 18.4 km (11.4 mi) from Ixtepec Airport. (16°21′03″N 95°10′57″W)
    The ones declared on October 11 are:
  - Santa María Mixtequilla, 502 ha (1,240 acres), next to the Mexican Federal Highway 185D and the 190D, 4.6 km (2.9 mi) from Line Z, 33 km (21 mi) from Ixtepec Airport. (16°25′06″N 95°14′25″W)
  - Ciudad Ixtepec, 412 ha (1,020 acres), next to the Mexican Federal Highway 185D, 3.5 km (2.2 mi) from Line Z, 33 km (21 mi) from Ixtepec Airport. (16°33′32″N 95°08′46″W)
  - Matías Romero Avendaño, 185 ha (460 acres), next to Line Z, near the Mexican Federal Highway 185 (the Transistmian Highway), 113 km (70 mi) from Ixtepec Airport. (17°12′58″N 95°03′02″W)
    The one declared on October 16 is:
  - Asunción Ixtaltepec, 246 ha (610 acres), located next to the Mexican Federal Highway 185, 1 km (0.62 mi) from Line Z, 47 km (29 mi) from Ixtepec Airport. (16°42′24″N 94°58′12″W)
- In Veracruz:
  - San Juan Evangelista, 360 ha (890 acres), 3.5 km (2.2 mi) from the railway node of Medias Aguas which intersects the Tehuantepec Railway with railways heading to Central and Northern Mexico, 7.5 km (4.7 mi) from the Mexican Federal Highway 185. (17°43′12″N 95°00′52″W)
  - Texistepec, 462 ha (1,140 acres), 37 km (23 mi) from the port of Coatzacoalcos, 39.6 km (24.6 mi) from Minatitlán International Airport. (17°55′34″N 94°48′02″W)
  - Coatzacoalcos I, 257 ha (640 acres), 3.1 km (1.9 mi) from Line Z, 9 km (5.6 mi) from the port, 41.5 km (25.8 mi) from Minatitlán International Airport. (18°04′40″N 94°20′45″W)
  - Coatzacoalcos II, 131 ha (320 acres), 24.6 km (15.3 mi) from Minatitlán International Airport. (18°08′43″N 94°23′31″W)

On 20 June 2023, the government published an invitation to tender to obtain a two-year long concession with possibility of purchase for five of the first six Poles (excluding San Blas Atempa). Registrations for the invitation were held between June 26 and 30, and the decisions were officially made on 17 November 2023. On 30 October 2023, the government published another invitation for the Poles declared throughout that month, and the decisions for it were programmed for 12 April 2024. The only Pole which has yet to be opened for bidding is San Blas Atempa.

In the first weeks of October, the Secretary of Economy stated that over 100 businesses showed interest in the Corridor, and of these 12 reached the final phase of the bidding. By then, according to Enrique Nachón García, Secretary of Economic and Port Development (SEDECOP), these businesses were already enjoying the tax benefits offered at a state and federal level. Buenrostro added that there is contemplation for the construction of 2 industrial parks in the area of Tapachula, Chiapas, as the Corridor's Line K reaches Cuidad Hidalgo, at the south of the state. On 22 December 2023, general director Morales Ángeles confirmed that there will be two additional Poles near Port Chiapas.

On 22 November 2023, the names of the companies which won the bidding of the first five Poles were revealed: Mota-Engil México S.A.P.I. de C.V., the Mexican subsidiary of the multinational construction group of Portuguese origin, won both of the Coatzacoalcos Poles and the Pole of Salina Cruz. This company was contracted in 2022 by the Secretariat of the Navy to rehabilitate 310 km (190 mi) of Line FA, and has also worked on the construction of several other railway works; Grupo Constructor Urcedic S.A. de C.V., a Mexican construction company, won the Pole of San Juan Evangelista; and both Profharmax S.A. de C.V., a pharmaceutical and medical company, and Transportadora Comexsa S.A. de C.V., a Mexican industrial transportation company, won the Pole of Texistepec. The concessions for these Poles were officially signed and offered during the Line Z's passenger train inauguration ceremony on 22 December 2023. However, on 23 February 2024, without explaining many details, the Pole of San Juan Evangelista was declared deserted by the Corridor's general director Morales Ángeles, even though a representative of Urcedic was an honored guest during the inauguration of Line Z's passenger train. Three days later, a second tender was called for, whose winner will be announced on 20 May 2024. Later, on 15 April 2024, the companies which won the Poles declared in October were announced: Santa María Mixtequilla was won by Profharmax in consortium with ABCD ARQUITECTURA S.A. DE C.V., and Matías Romero Avendaño was awarded to Sergio Mañón Pineda in consortium with ABCD ARQUITECTURA, though at the time Asunción Ixtaltepec was declared deserted. On 2 September 2024, it was announced that the Pole of Asunción Ixtaltepec was awarded to ARZYZ, S.A. DE C.V., a Nuevo León-based company dedicated to aluminum alloys manufacturing and commercializing primary metals.

On 14 December 2023, a private organization named ProIstmo was presented, which seeks to "revive the South-Southeast of the country", contemplating an investment of $14 billion pesos in the Pole of Texistepec. This organization is in charge of the development and construction of the Pole of Texistepec through the consortium between Profharmax and Transportadora Comexsa. Construction for the Pole of Texistepec officially started on 28 February 2024, with a planned investment of $1.8 billion in urbanization. ProIstmo is also involved in the Poles of Santa María Mixtequilla and Matías Romero. Sergio Mañón Pineda, who was awarded the Pole of Matías Romero, is a director of investment attraction in ProIstmo, and one of the directors of ABCD ARQUITECTURA is also a member of ProIstmo's board of directors.

On 24 November 2023, López Obrador claimed on a morning press conference that a Danish fund, Copenhagen Infrastructure Partners (CIP), will invest US$10 billion in the area of Ixtepec to produce green hydrogen, as one of the activities done during his administration to "avoid climate change", as he claimed in the announcement. A CIP spokesperson confirmed on August 18, two days after López Obrador revealed this project in a letter to US President Joe Biden (not mentioning the size of the investment at the time), "that we are involved in a large-scale green hydrogen project in the Oaxaca region in Mexico. [...] We will provide further updates as the project progresses." Though the president lamented that he would not see the project completed before the end of his term, he guaranteed that "this will help the Isthmus [of Tehuantepec] very, very much." During the Corridor's inauguration ceremony, the Mexican government, represented by the Secretary of the Navy José Rafael Ojeda Durán, and CIP, represented by its partner Ole Kjems Sørensen, signed a memorandum of understanding to start the operations of Helax Istmo, the company responsible for this objective, originally created in 2022.

=== Reactions and economic impact ===
According to Eduardo Romero Fong, coordinator for the development and strategy of the industrial productive sector and welfare of the Corridor, the Corridor has the potential to be a "cheaper and faster" alternative to the Panama Canal, as, as he stated, it will be capable of transporting "1.4 million containers annually from port to port in a journey of less than six hours." He also stated that by the year 2050 the Corridor will generate 1.6% of the national GDP, US$50 billion of investment and 550,000 jobs. On 27 July 2023, the Mexican Secretary of Economy Raquel Buenrostro Sánchez claimed the Corridor would contribute to 3% to 5% of the GDP once it starts operating at full capacity. It also has an advantage over the Panama Canal regarding its location, as American businesses seeking to transport cargo from one ocean to the other wouldn't have to travel all the way south to Panama, resulting in much faster transportation.

Alfredo Oranges, ambassador of Panama in Mexico, stated in May 2023 that, rather than a competitor to the Panama Canal, the Corridor can actually be "complementary" to it, offering to the government of López Obrador the century-old experience in port infrastructure of Panama and the capacity to receive cargo ships with large drafts. The former general director of the CIIT Rafael Marín Mollinedo agrees with this idea, since the Panama Canal "is saturated and cannot cope with all the demand", thus he states that "we don't call it an alternative, we prefer to refer to it as a complement."

Economists have observed that, if done well, the Corridor has a strong opportunity to boost the Mexican economy, especially in the South, by facilitating trade between the American East Coast and the Mexican South, as Mexican exports in this region are "very underrepresented", as Mexican economists Luis de la Calle and Adrián de la Garza pointed out. López Obrador has also expressed his expectation for the Corridor to improve trade with Asia, especially with China. From these factors, they agree that it has the potential to become the most important infrastructure project of López Obrador's presidency. Economist and analyst of the energy sector Rosanety Barrios suggests that, through government investments in highways, ports, railways, and offering safety and energy services, the Mexican South can gradually achieve obtaining the conditions of the North, a region which has enjoyed economic growth for years. Analysts have also concluded that the project will benefit various impoverished communities of Oaxaca by offering employment and access to services like health, water, sewer systems and education, along with various other improvements in infrastructure. Even some of López Obrador's critics, like economist and researcher Jorge Basave Kunhardt, have recognized the potential of the project, deeming it as "a promising project, in my opinion the only one with long-term sustainable projection among the megaprojects executed in this sexenio", though he noted that it "is not a project with short-term results, and it will only be successful if it transcends sexenios and administrations from various parties."

In September 2023, it was reported that the South and Southeast of Mexico, as a result of the various megaprojects López Obrador's administration has developed in the region, including the Corridor, has experienced unprecedented levels of economic growth after facing decades of stagnation. The reports found that the Mexican GDP on a nation-wide scale grew to an annual rate of 3.6% during the second quarter of the year, and that the eight states of the South and Southeast grew by 6%, twice the amount of the northern states.

The Mexican Secretary of Navy José Rafael Ojeda Durán stated on 1 June 2023, during a conference in Ciudad Madero, Tamaulipas, during the National Navy Day, that with the Corridor Mexico will become "a world shipping power" in the near future. Former Secretary of Government Adán Augusto López stated in a speech at Coatzacoalcos, prior to the 2024 Mexican general election, that the Corridor will not only be beneficial to Mexico, but to the rest of the world: "the Transisthmian [Corridor] is an old dream of the Mexicans and it's now a reality for all the inhabitants, from Salina Cruz to Coatzacoalcos; it's not just about connecting the country, it's about connecting the world."

==== Challenges ====
Though many view the creation of the Corridor in a positive way, analysts have pointed out that in order for the Corridor to achieve its goals it will have to overcome some considerable challenges, especially regarding safety and infrastructure, as crime and lack of proper infrastructure in the Mexican South have been a persistent issue.

In terms of infrastructure, the Corridor has the challenge of supplying the necessary amounts of natural gas, as it is estimated that it would require a supply of 11.3 billion cubic feet (320,000,000 m^{3}) of natural gas, which would mean an increase of over 120% in the national distribution of hydrocarbon. At least 20 billion ft^{3} (570,000,000 m^{3}) of natural gas, above the 9 billion ft^{3} (250,000,000 m^{3}) which are currently supplied (as of August 2023), will have to be supplied daily for the desired industrial activities to be carried out. This imposes a challenge since the majority of Mexico's current natural gas supply is imported, especially from the United States, and since the state-owned company Pemex has faced complications in its attempts to increase the country's gas production. The Mexican Institute for Competitiveness (IMCO, by its initials in Spanish) has reported that a larger supply of natural gas will be needed for Mexico to take advantage of the recent impact which the economic phenomenon known as nearshoring has had in the country, as, despite the country's gas pipeline network's length having increased by over 50% between 2011 and 2022, it is still insufficient for the supply for the Mexican South and Southeast, where the Corridor is being built, a factor which has contributed to that region's lack of industrial development and economic competitiveness. As of 2023, nearly half of the demand for natural gas was concentrated in the six states bordering the United States, while only 16% was concentrated in the South and Southeast.

Francisco N. González Díaz, president of the National Industry of Auto Parts (Industria Nacional de Autopartes), has stated that, though various national vehicle manufacturers have shown interest in the Corridor, not all of them could be functional in the region due to its highway infrastructure. Carlos Corral Serrano, executive director of the Mexican Association of Urban Planners (Asociación Mexicana de Urbanistas), has found the existing infrastructure of the region insufficient and in need of improvement. A limited number of qualified personnel in the region could also be a challenge, which thus makes an investment in education and training a priority for the Corridor.

Another potential challenge the Corridor faces is the demand for an alternative route to the Panama Canal. The Mexican government has shown great enthusiasm for the project, as the Canal has suffered an intense drought which has reduced the number of ships that can cross it per day and has limited the weight each ship can carry, an issue which Mexico sees as an opportunity since such issues caused by climate change may increase the demand for a land-based alternative route, in addition to the fact that Mexico became a highly attractive country for investors in recent times. However, former director of the Regulatory Agency of Railway Transportation in Mexico (Agencia Reguladora de Transporte Ferroviario en México), Benjamín Alemán, believes that the current infrastructure of the Corridor is not sufficient to attract ships with large drafts, thus it is probable that only smaller ships would be interested in using it, though the Corridor's closer proximity to Asia and the American East Coast, one of the busiest trade routes which cross through the Americas, could be a point in its favor.

Independently from these factors, the British newspaper Financial Times reported on 16 October 2023 that international shipping companies and other such entities have yet to show significant interest for the Corridor; an executive at Unique Logistics, for example, stated that whenever an alternative trade route is available, importers become highly skeptical and unsure of whether they should use it or not due to their lack of knowledge on its reliability. Lars Østergaard Nielsen, an executive at A.P. Møller-Mærsk (one of the world's largest container shipping groups), stated that the Corridor "could be very useful" if more manufacturing came to the Mexican South, but otherwise there would be "less demand." In addition to this factor, the report also found that the Corridor's initial phase will have the capacity to transport a maximum of 1.14 million twenty-foot equivalent units (TEUs) annually, and in September a projection was presented which indicated that 304 thousand would move through it by 2028 and 1.3 million by 2036, which is considerably less than the number transported through the Panama Canal, which transported 10.9 million in 2022. The report states that the construction of sufficient infrastructure for the project could take years and large sums of money, which makes it a risky venture.

== Incidents ==
In 2025 on December 28 a train derailed killing 14 and injuring 98 persons. After just two years in operation, the rail line has recorded six serious incidents, though this was the first to result in fatalities. This marked the second accident on the corridor in December. On Dec. 20, farther north in the state of Chiapas, a tanker truck unsuccessfully attempted to cross ahead of a passenger train carrying 148 people. A similar incident occurred in July, when another vehicle tried to beat the train at a separate grade crossing in Chiapas.

== Controversies ==
=== Indigenous and environmental activism ===
Though some observers have pointed out that the Corridor has the potential to boost the economy of Southern Mexico and benefit the local population and impoverished communities of Oaxaca, as is one of the goals of the project, several incidents have occurred in which Indigenous and environmental activists have clashed with the interests of the government for the Corridor or have faced other related problems.

Several Indigenous communities in Oaxaca, for instance, have raised their concern regarding the environmental impact of the Corridor, with communities like that of the locality of Puente Madera, in the Zapotec municipality of San Blas Atempa, protesting against the construction of an industrial park in the land over this issue, despite the government's payment of 52 million pesos for it. Later, in June 2023, a federal court in Salina Cruz ruled in favor of the community after reporting irregularities in the purchase of the land, temporarily suspending the construction of the park. Prior to this, on April 28, a violent incident occurred in the site of Mogoñé Viejo, in San Juan Guichicovi, when Mixe activists clashed with the authorities after two months of blocking the Corridor's workers from rehabilitating a portion of the Transisthmian Railway. The clash resulted in the arrest of six protesters, two men and four women, one of whom was beaten by the authorities, according to eyewitnesses. The Secretariat of the Navy claimed this happened in response to a group of protesters attacking the Corridor's workers verbally and physically using poles and machetes. Nonetheless, organizations such as the EZLN and the National Indigenous Congress would refer to this event as an act of political repression, and demanded for the protesters to be liberated immediately. They were all liberated two days later.

Such conflicts with Indigenous environmental activists were already expected, as various Indigenous communities of the isthmus region are heavily opposed to the exploitation of their lands' resources by industrial parks, having entered into conflicts for them for decades. This, the UNAM academic Antionio Suárez suggests, could be one of the Corridor's greatest challenges, though he stated that, regardless, the Corridor is still "more positive than negative for the nation." The Indigenous peoples desire, above all other services, better agricultural infrastructure which does not negatively interfere with the local biodiversity and their traditions, in addition to the depollution of the land and water, hence the environmental concerns due to the industrial parks. Furthermore, the Isthmian population is concerned regarding a perceived surge in crime and violence which was not present prior to the project's creation, as locals claim that the isthmus region was peaceful, but as the project progressed "unprecedented" acts of violence started to take place. This has also made Indigenous communities afraid of losing their identity. There have also been concerns over several activists, including elderly people, being criminally charged, allegedly over their opposition to the project.

On 4 July 2023, a Zapotec activist from Santa María Mixtequilla, Noel López Gallegos, was found dead by the local police in the municipality 24 hours after being reported as missing. The cause of his death was apparently an inflicted head injury. Prior to his death, López Gallegos and his brother had questioned the payment of 130 million pesos which the community received in exchange for the land, both of them claiming that it should be distributed among all four thousand inhabitants of the municipality, to the discomfort of the local comuneros since, as he claimed, the payment only benefited them and their offspring. His death sparked outrage, with the Union of Communities of the Northern Zone of the Isthmus of Tehuantepec (Ucizoni) condemning the murder and blaming it as a result of "how the imposition of a megaproject breaks the community fabric" since he was a member of a peaceful civil resistance group which questioned the development of the Corridor. As of July 12, little information is known regarding this case, other than that the police arrested a man in relation to his disappearance two days after the body was found. Acts of violence like such have worried various Indigenous communities in the isthmus.

In late July, 23 civil society organizations registered, after three days of investigation, various violations to human rights in the isthmus region related to the construction of the Corridor, such as intimidation from members of the Mexican National Guard, in Santa María Mixtequilla, to members of the Community Assembly and people who showed resistance to the project, illegal occupation of lands, dispossessions and acts of physical aggression against comuneros and comuneras in the town of Santa Cruz Tagolaba, in Tehuantepec, among other violations in other sites committed by the National Guard, the Armed Forces, the state police and other authorities, businesses and armed groups. The organizations reported at least 21 cases of intimidation and threats against community defenders or their families, 11 acts of physical and psychological violence, three homicides between October 2022 and July 2023, and other cases of human rights being violated in various parts of the isthmus. Additionally, farmers and local community members have reported how their property and land has been stolen, that they've been victims of extortion and that violence has increased in the Isthmus of Tehuantepec since the project became known, yet the authorities have done little to combat this issue: "It's already been two years and the Attorney General of the Republic, the Vice-Attorney of the Isthmus and the Attorney General of the State have done nothing, the situation is still the same. [...] These people [the alleged criminals] [...] are walking freely like any other citizen," a local comunero told reporters in October 2023. Likewise, local communities have also claimed that the Corridor authorities have not fulfilled many of their promises. Some inhabitants of the municipality of Salina Cruz, for example, claim that during the works of the railway's rehabilitation some people were evicted, though new homes for them are being built, and promises to improve services of electricity and water have remained unfulfilled, just weeks before the Corridor's planned inauguration: "They [the Corridor authorities] used to beg us and offer us about everything, now they won't even acknowledge us," they claim.

In general, reactions of Indigenous peoples and Isthmian communities to the project have been polarized: on one hand are the people who rejoice over the expected increase in investment, tourism and economic growth, as well as the expected improvements in infrastructure and services; these people believe this project is one of the greatest that have been executed in the region in decades. On the other hand are the people concerned and upset over the issues mentioned above, as concerns over allegedly flawed environmental studies, the perceived rise of organized crime, forced relocations of Indigenous communities and other mentioned issues persist.

== Directors ==
- Rafael Marín Mollinedo, businessman from Quintana Roo, former director of Urban Services of the Federal District from 2000 to 2005 (24 June 2019 – 5 January 2023).
- Raymundo Pedro Morales Ángeles, vice admiral of the Mexican Navy and naval engineer (5 January 2023 – 1 October 2024).
- Juan Carlos Vera Minjares, vice admiral and former chief of the Corridor's Unit of Infrastructure and Transportation (1 October 2024 – currently in charge).
