= Raymundo Morales Ángeles =

Mexican Secretary of the Navy (born 1966)

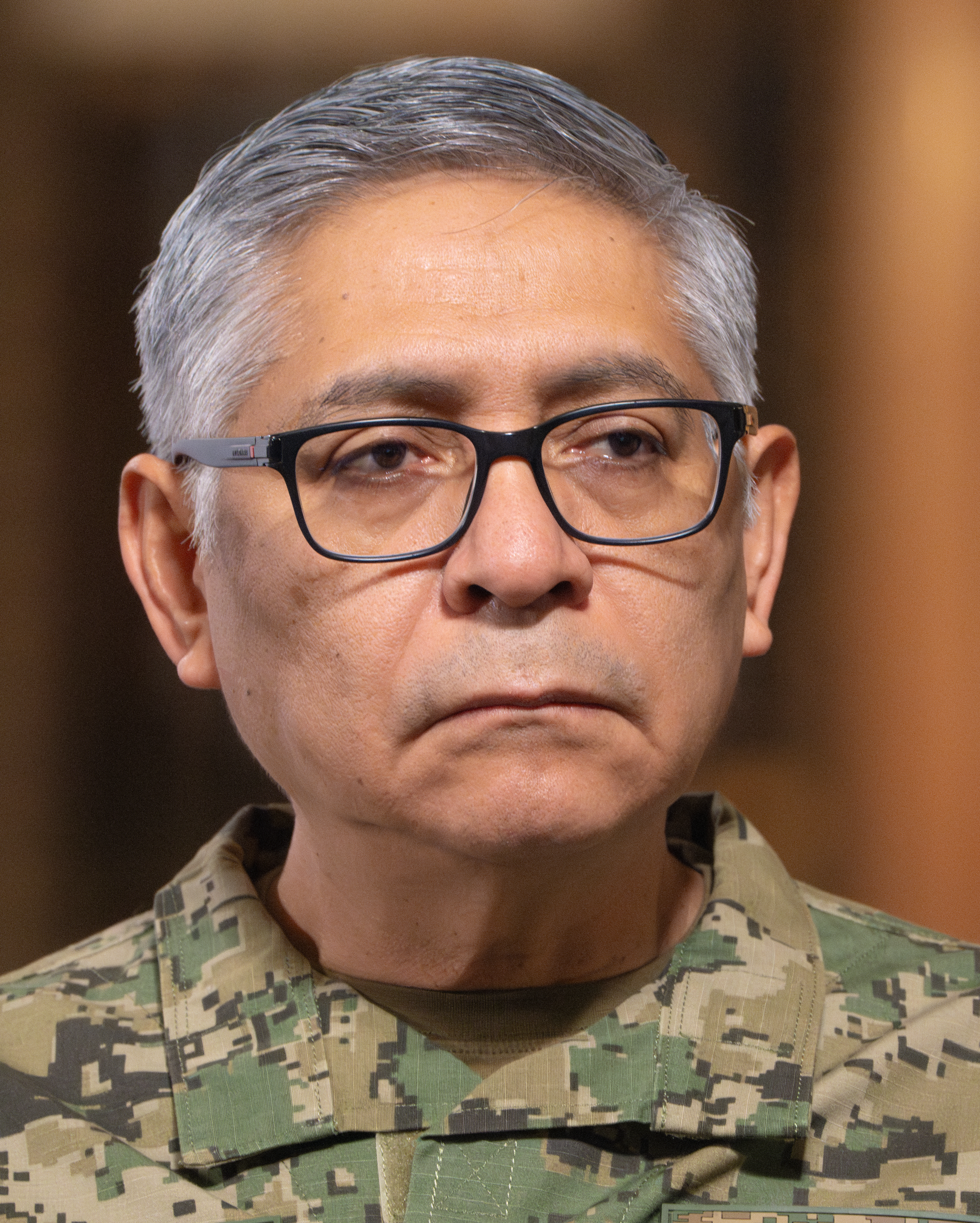

Secretary of the Navy
- Incumbent
- Assumed office 1 October 2024
- President: Claudia Sheinbaum
- Preceded by: José Rafael Ojeda Durán

Personal details
- Born: 4 July 1966 (age 59) San Ildefonso, Sola de Vega, Oaxaca, Mexico
- Occupation: Naval officer

Raymundo Pedro Morales Ángeles (Note: In this Spanish name, the first or paternal surname is Morales and the second or maternal family name is Ángeles.) (born 4 July 1966) is an officer of the Mexican Navy with the rank of admiral. He has been the Secretary of the Navy since 1 October 2024 during the administration of President Claudia Sheinbaum.

== Biography ==
Raymundo Morales Ángeles was born on 4 July 1966 in the community of San Ildefonso, belonging to the municipality of Villa Sola de Vega, Oaxaca.

From 1983 to 1987, he studied at the Heroic Naval Military School, from where he graduated with the rank of midshipman. In 1989, he obtained an engineering degree in naval science. He studied a course in defence policy and strategy at the Centre for Hemispheric Defence Studies at the National Defense University in the United States.^{[2]}

He has served as commander of the ninth and thirteenth naval zones. He was also the director of the Centre for Advanced Naval Studies and deputy naval attaché at the Mexican Embassy to the United States.

In January 2023, he was appointed general director of the Interoceanic Corridor of the Isthmus of Tehuantepec by President Andrés Manuel López Obrador and, on 20 November 2023, was promoted to the rank of admiral.

On 6 September 2024, President-elect Claudia Sheinbaum announced her intention to appoint him to serve as Secretary of the Navy and, with the start of the new administration, he took office on 1 October.
