= Rafael Ojeda =

Mexican Secretary of Navy

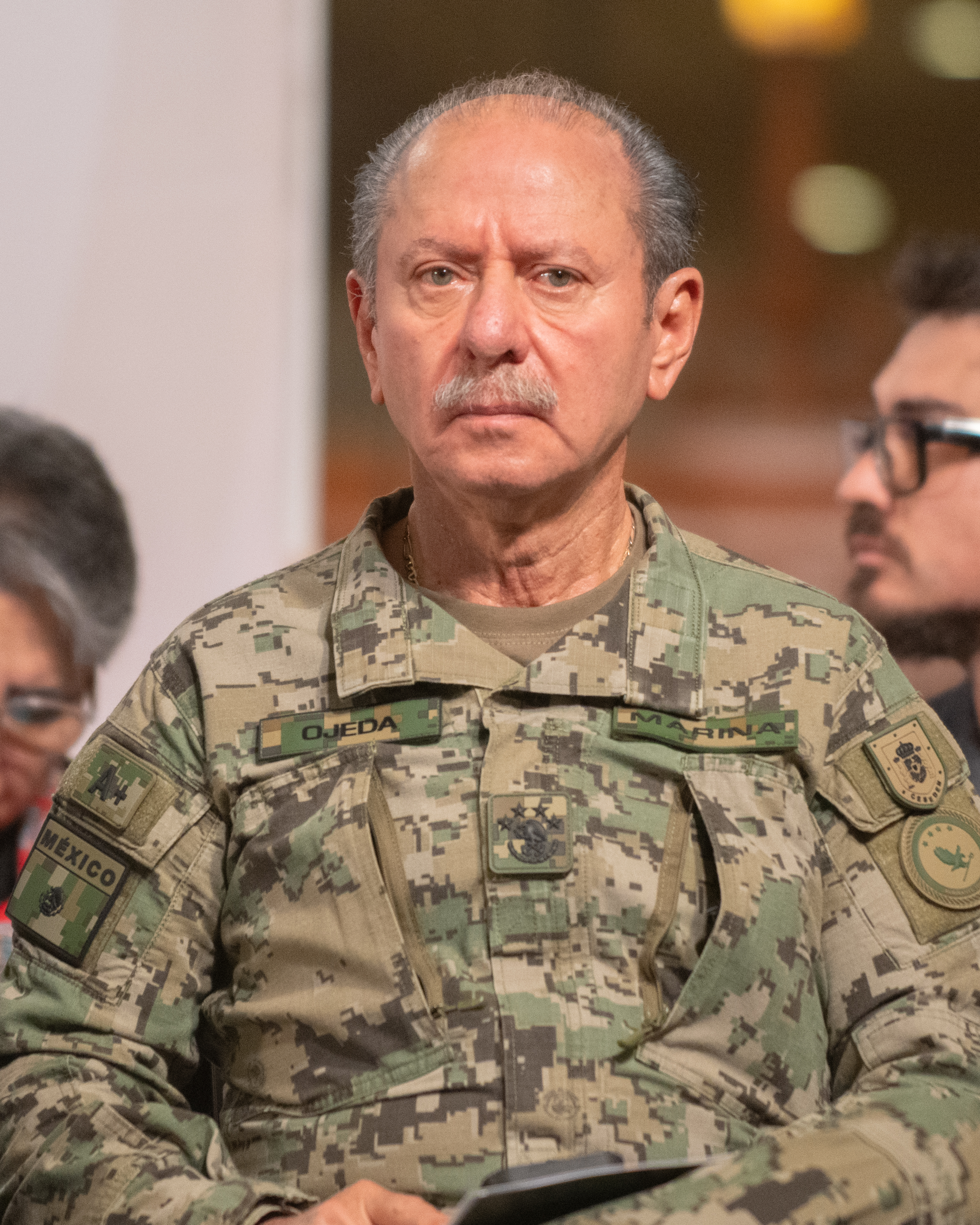
- Born: José Rafael Ojeda Durán; February 3, 1954 (age 72); Xalapa, Veracruz, Mexico
- Education: Heroica Escuela Naval Militar
- Spouse: Sandra Luz Laguna Rivera
- Children: 3
- Military career
- Allegiance: Mexico
- Branch: Mexican Navy
- Service years: 1974–2024
- Rank: Secretariat of the Navy
- Commands: (Former commands over); Llava; Colon; Guillermo Prieto; Morelos; Sixth Mexican F Flotilla; Pacific Naval Force; Eighth Naval Region
- Conflicts: Mexican drug war
- Awards: Sixth-First Class Perseverance Awards; Third-Second Exceptional Perseverance Awards

Secretary of the Navy
- In office 1 October 2018 – 30 September 2024
- President: Andrés Manuel López Obrador
- Preceded by: Vidal Francisco Soberón Sanz
- Succeeded by: Raymundo Morales Ángeles

José Rafael Ojeda Durán (born 3 February 1954) is the former Mexican Secretary of the Navy in the Cabinet of Andrés Manuel López Obrador. He has worked in the Mexican Navy in various positions for nearly 50 years.

He is a member of the Mexican Legion of Honor.

== Biography ==
José Rafael Ojeda Durán was born on 3 February 1954. Joining the Heroica Escuela Naval Militar (where he later served as a professor) in 1969, he later graduated as a Guardiamarina (Midshipman) in 1974.

In the time after his graduation, he served in the Navy for 50 years on a variety of vessels, commands, and assorted offices. Among these: he led the Eighth Naval Region, Fourteenth Naval Region, Sixth Flotilla, Pacific Naval Force, Chief of Naval Operations, and was a Senior Naval Admiral.

Durán was appointed to Secretariat of the Navy under the presidential cabinet of Andrés Manuel López Obrador, having prior served as an Inspector and General Comptroller of the Navy. He was appointed on 30 November 2018.

=== Controversy ===
Durán was criticized for not investigating the Iguala mass kidnapping when it was theorized that the 43 victims were incinerated by sailors operating in the Eighth Naval Region, which he had control over at the time.

=== Tropical Storm Hernan ===
In 2020, he announced a so-called 'Naval Plan' to help aid those affected by Tropical Storm Hernan. This program consisted of rescue operations, cleanup, and evacuations, conducted by 450 units of the Mexican Navy.
