= Laguna Superior =

Lagoon on the southern coast of Mexico

Coordinates: 16°19′N 94°54′W

The Laguna Superior is a coastal lagoon in Mexico located on the southeast of the state of Oaxaca. It is an enclosed part of the Gulf of Tehuantepec and is connected to the Pacific Ocean by a strait.

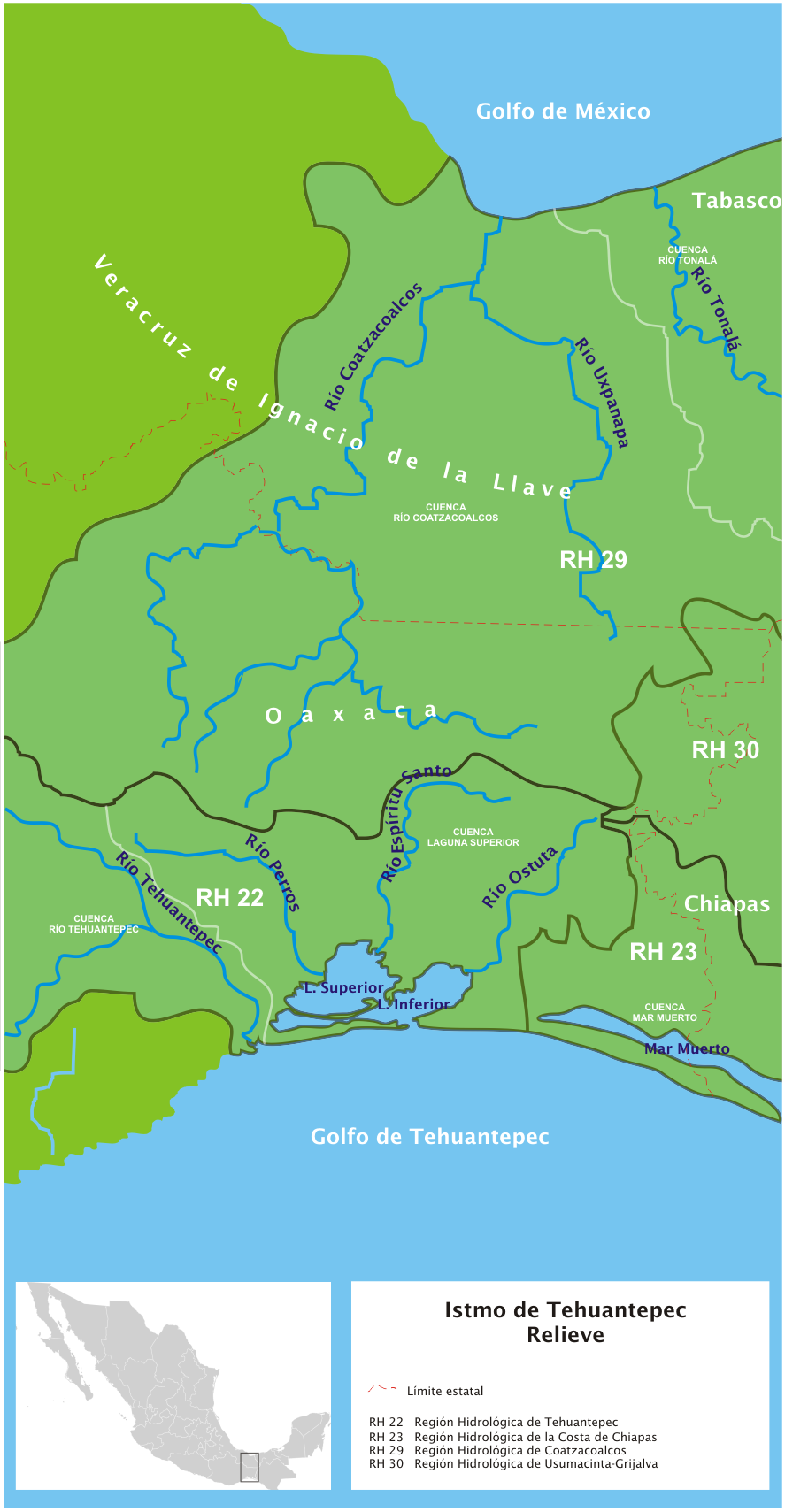

It is part of the lagoon system of the Isthmus of Tehuantepec, which also includes the Quirio, Occidental, Oriental, and Inferior lagoons. The Perros River, Estacudo Stream, Chilapa River, and San José Stream flow into its waters. It has a surface area of 380 km².

Inhabited places on this lagoon includes Playa San Vicente and Playa Unión (Raa Bidxi), belonging to the Municipality of Juchitán de Zaragoza.
