= Secretariat of the Navy =

Mexican naval military official

Coordinates: 19.322°N 99.128°W

Secretary of the Navy
- Secretaría de Marina
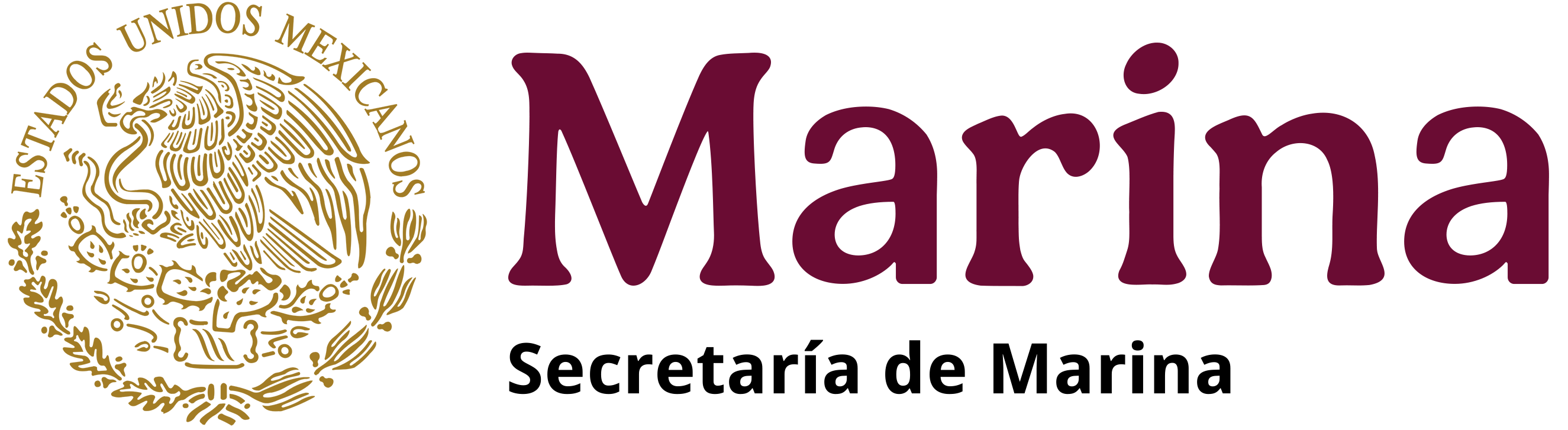
- Secretary of the Navy logo

Agency overview
- Jurisdiction: Federal government of Mexico
- Agency executive: Raymundo Pedro Morales Ángeles, Secretary
- Website: www.semar.gob.mx

The Secretariat of the Navy (Spanish: Secretaría de Marina, SEMAR) is one of the twenty-one state secretariats of the government of Mexico. It is in charge of designing, planning, executing and coordinating public policies related to the Mexican Navy.

The Secretary of the Navy is a member of the federal executive cabinet, as well as the highest-ranking Mexican naval officer with the responsibility of commanding the Mexican Navy, including the Mexican Marine Corps as well as the Mexican merchant marine service. The secretary is appointed by the president of Mexico.

== Functions ==
Based on article 30 of the Organic Law of the Federal Public Administration, among other actions the Secretariat is mandated to:

- Organize and administer the affairs of the Mexican Navy
- Manage the assets and reserves of the Navy in all its aspects
- Grant licenses and withdrawals, and intervene in the pensions of Navy service personnel
- Exercise sovereignty in territorial waters, as well as monitoring the coast of the territory, waterways, national islands and the exclusive economic zone
- Organize, administer and operate the naval aviation service
- Conduct naval public education
- Organize and administer the maritime police service
- Inspect the services of the Navy
- Build, rebuild and conserve the port works required by the Navy
- Establish and manage the stores and fuel stations and lubricants of the Navy
- Execute the topohydrographic works of the coasts, islands, ports and waterways, as well as organize the maritime chart file and relative statistics
- Intervene in the granting of permits for expeditions or scientific explorations abroad or international in national waters
- Build, maintain and operate, shipyards, dams, boatyards and naval establishments destined to the ships of the Mexican Navy
- Organize and provide naval health services
- Integrate the national oceanographic information archive
- Help in the organization and enforcement of National Naval Military Service
- Organize Maritime SAR operations
- Administer and operate the Mexican Merchant Marine Fleets

== List of secretaries ==
- President Manuel Ávila Camacho
  - (1940–1946) : Heriberto Jara
- President Miguel Alemán
  - (1946–1948) : Luis F. Schaulfelberger
  - (1948–1949) : David Coello
  - (1949–1952) : Alberto J. Pawling
- President Adolfo Ruiz Cortines
  - (1952–1955) : Rodolfo Sánchez Taboada
  - (1955–1958) : Roberto Gómez Maqueo
  - (1958–1958) : Héctor Meixueiro
- President Adolfo López Mateos
  - (1958–1964) : Manuel Zermeño Araico
- President Gustavo Díaz Ordaz
  - (1964–1970) : Antonio Vázquez del Mercado
- President Luis Echeverría
  - (1970–1976) : Luis M. Bravo Carrera
- President José López Portillo
  - (1976–1982) : Ricardo Cházaro Lara
- President Miguel de la Madrid
  - (1982–1988) : Miguel Ángel Gómez Ortega
- President Carlos Salinas de Gortari
  - (1988–1990) : Mauricio Scheleske Sánchez
  - (1990–1994) : Luis Carlos Ruano Angulo
- President Ernesto Zedillo
  - (1994–2000) : José Ramón Lorenzo Franco
- President Vicente Fox
  - (2000–2006) : Marco Antonio Peyrot González
- President Felipe Calderón
  - (2006–2012) : Mariano Francisco Saynez Mendoza
- President Enrique Peña Nieto
  - (2012–2018) : Vidal Francisco Soberón Sanz
- President Andrés Manuel López Obrador
  - (2018–2024) : José Rafael Ojeda Durán
- President : Claudia Sheinbaum
  - (2024–present) : Raymundo Pedro Morales Ángeles
