= Víctor Flores Olea =

Mexican academic, writer, photographer, and diplomat (1932–2020)

Permanent Representative of Mexico to the United Nations
- In office March 1994 – February 1995
- Preceded by: Manuel Tello Macías
- Succeeded by: Manuel Tello Macías

President of CONACULTA
- In office 1988–1992
- Preceded by: position created
- Succeeded by: Rafael Tovar y de Teresa

Permanent Delegate to UNESCO
- In office 1977–1982
- Preceded by: Luis Echeverría
- Succeeded by: Luis Villoro

Ambassador of Mexico to the Soviet Union
- In office 1975–1976

Personal details
- Born: 24 August 1932 Toluca, State of Mexico, Mexico
- Died: 20 November 2020 (aged 88) Acapulco, Guerrero, Mexico
- Occupation: Academic, writer, photographer, diplomat

Víctor Flores Olea (Note: In this Spanish name, the first or paternal surname is Flores and the second or maternal family name is Olea.) (24 August 1932 – 22 November 2020) was a Mexican academic, writer, photographer, and diplomat. He held positions at the National Autonomous University of Mexico and in the federal government, and he represented his country as ambasador to the Union of Soviet Socialist Republics and as permanent representative to the United Nations. His published books comprised both fiction and non-fiction, as well as collections of his photographs.

== Professional life ==
Víctor Flores Olea was born in Toluca, State of Mexico, in 1932. He studied law at the National Autonomous University of Mexico (UNAM) and pursued postgraduate studies in Paris and Rome.

He was the director of the Centre for Latin American Studies at the UNAM's School of Political and Social Sciences (FCPyS) from 1966 to 1969; his tenure coincided with the 1968 students' movement, during which he served as an intermediary between the authorities and the protesting students. He was later appointed the director of the FCPyS, a position that he held from 1970 to 1975. He left in 1975 upon his appointment as ambassador to the Soviet Union, where he served for two years. Between 1977 and 1978 he was the under-secretary for culture at the Secretariat of Public Education (SEP) and, from 1977 to 1982, he was Mexico's permanent delegate to UNESCO. He was also the under-secretary for multilateral affairs at the Secretariat of Foreign Affairs (SRE) in 1982–1988 and, from 1988 to 1992, the first president of the newly created National Council for Culture and Arts (CONACULTA). (Note: CONACULTA was elevated to ministerial level as the Secretariat of Culture in 2015.)

In March 1994, he was appointed permanent representative of Mexico to the United Nations. During his tenure, he spoke out against Security Council Resolution 940 authorising a multinational military invention in Haiti. He was replaced by Manuel Tello Macías in February 1995.

In later life, he was a researcher at the UNAM's Centre for Interdisciplinary Research in Science and Humanities (CEIICH), where he worked on international relations and political systems and published his last two books.

As a writer he published both fiction and academic studies. During the 1950s he was the assistant editor of the Medio Siglo magazine of the UNAM Law School and he later wrote for a range of newspapers and magazines, including El Universal, Excélsior, La Jornada, Nexos and Siempre!.

He was also a photographer: he published several collections of his photographs, and Mexico City's Museum of Modern Art hosted a one-man show of his work in 1977; in addition, he participated in collective exhibitions in various other countries. He was also instrumental in the 1994 creation of the Centro de la Imagen, a CONACULTA-run cultural centre dedicated to photography that stands alongside the Biblioteca de México José Vasconcelos in a remodelled 18th-century tobacco processing plant in central Mexico City.

Víctor Flores Olea died in Acapulco, Guerrero, on 22 November 2020, at the age of 88. Condolences were expressed by President Andrés Manuel López Obrador, who had studied under him, and by Secretary of Culture Alejandra Frausto.

== Personal life ==
Flores Olea was married to the Spanish-born actress Mercedes Pascual (1930–2010); their daughter, born in 1966, is the actress Mercedes Olea.

== Publications ==
Flores Olea's published works included the following:

=== Fiction ===
Registro de los sueños (1990), short stories
Tiempos de olvido (1992), novel
Memoria en llamas (1995), novel
Tres historias de mujer (1998), short stories

=== Non-fiction ===
Ensayo sobre la soberanía del Estado (1969)
La rebelión estudiantil y la sociedad contemporánea (1973, with Ernest Mandel)
Internet y la revolución cibernética (1997)
Crítica de la globalidad : dominación y liberación en nuestro tiempo (2004)
La crisis de las utopías (2010)

=== Photography ===
Huellas de sol (1991)
Nuevo tiempo de arena (2010)
