= Rafael Tovar =

Rafael Tovar may refer to:

- Rafael Tovar y de Teresa (1954–2016), Mexican lawyer, diplomat and cultural official
- Rafael Tovar (governor) (1928–1999), Venezuelan politician, governor of Nueva Esparta from 1995 to 1999
