= Gustavo Peñasco Hidalgo =

Mexican military engineer and builder (born 1880)

- Peñasco on his enlistment record at the Colegio Militar, 1898
- Born: Gustavo Enrique Peñasco Hidalgo; July 27, 1880; Xalapa, Veracruz, Mexico
- Education: Colegio Militar
- Occupations: Military engineer, building contractor
- Years active: 1906–1940s
- Practice: G. Peñasco y Cía.; Peñasco y González; Sociedad de Bienes y Empresas
- Buildings: Tonalá 90 and Jalapa 90 palacetes; Tabasco 133; privada at Córdoba 31–35 (Colonia Roma)

Gustavo Enrique Peñasco Hidalgo (born 27 July 1880) was a Mexican military engineer and building contractor. Between 1912 and about 1920 he designed and built at least 41 houses, apartment buildings and privadas in Mexico City's Colonia Roma and Colonia Juárez, an unusually large output for the years of the Mexican Revolution. A major in the army's engineer corps, he marked almost all of these buildings with his name, which has allowed historians to identify and date his work.

== Early life and education ==
Peñasco was born in Xalapa, Veracruz, on 27 July 1880, the son of Emilio Peñasco Ramos, a native of Matamoros, Tamaulipas, and Rufina Hidalgo Gutiérrez, from Xalapa. He applied to the engineering department of the Colegio Militar in November 1897 and was admitted in January 1898, at the age of 17. His courses at Chapultepec between 1898 and 1903 included two years each of technical and architectural drawing, architectural composition, building mechanics and materials, stereotomy, carpentry and ironwork, and roads, canals and harbour works.

== Military career ==
After graduating he married, in late 1905, and served first in the Parque General de Ingenieros and then in the Cuerpo de Ingenieros Constructores. Article 149 of the engineers' regulations allowed officers to take private work provided they announced their military title in public; Peñasco applied on 20 March 1906 and received permission on 28 March. He continued with military duties, mainly repairs to buildings of the Secretaría de Guerra y Marina, and from 1908 taught at the Colegio Militar.

He was promoted to major in September 1911. From the following month he took repeated sick leave, supported by certificates from private doctors; an army doctor who examined him found nothing wrong. His first request for unlimited leave, in February 1912, was refused. He applied again, citing "nervous dyspepsia", and resigned his post teaching stereotomy and carpentry. On 11 April 1912 the army granted unlimited leave, noting that he had served the seven years he owed and plainly no longer wished to serve.

== Practice ==
Freed from the army, Peñasco devoted himself to private building. All of his signed works date from 1912 onwards, and he produced at least 41 of them by about 1920.

His inscriptions changed over the years and help to date the undated buildings. In 1912–1913 they read "Gustavo Peñasco, Yngeniero Militar, proyectó y construyó" in raised letters on a framed stone block. From 1914 to 1916 he dropped the military title, perhaps because of the political climate after the Ten Tragic Days, and signed as "Gustavo Peñasco, ingeniero y contratista" and then "G. Peñasco y Cía., Ingenieros y Contratistas". In 1917 he went back to signing alone, simply as "Gustavo Peñasco, ingeniero", with incised rather than raised letters. In 1918 and 1919 the plaques read "Peñasco y González, Ingenieros"; the partner's first name is not known, though he may have been the engineer Manuel González, who built three small houses on Valladolid in 1915. The last inscriptions, from about 1920, read "Sociedad de Bienes y Empresas S.A., Ing. Gustavo Peñasco", stressing the property business over design.

Peñasco built for both the middle and upper classes. Following the classification of Elena Segurajáuregui, San Martín Córdova sorts his 41 known works into two palacetes, seven grand residences, two half-cloister houses, 24 small middle-class houses, two pairs of mirrored houses and four multi-family buildings. Most stand on corner lots or in groups on adjoining plots, such as the three at Chapultepec and Flora, five at Colima and Orizaba, four at Tonalá and Tabasco, three at Querétaro and Tonalá and three at Puebla and Córdoba. This suggests that he or his clients owned several neighbouring lots and built quickly and in series to meet demand for housing, anticipating the mass-produced housing of the 1920s. His style remained historicist throughout, ranging from French-inspired classicism to neo-Gothic.

=== Later career ===
By 1921 Peñasco was travelling in Europe at his own expense; before leaving he had offered his services to the President, who asked him to study European barracks and granted him some money towards his costs. In 1924 he was living in Los Angeles, working on commission for the President on military buildings in the Bajío and on a project for a large military academy at the Hacienda de Sarabia in Guanajuato. He was working in the Bajío from mid-1925 for at least three years. He registered as a civil engineer with the Dirección General de Profesiones in 1941, and in 1947 asked the Defence ministry for a copy of his engineering title, which he had lost; it was returned to him in 1948. No signed buildings from this later period are known, and the date of his death has not been established.

== Works ==
=== Palacetes ===
- Tonalá 90, corner of Álvaro Obregón, Roma (c. 1917) — a single-storey house raised over a semi-basement, set back behind a small garden, with a stair leading to a raised terrace in the manner of French palacetes. The façade is richly carved in stone with cornices, balustrades, rosettes, escutcheons, laurel frames and garlands.
- Jalapa 90, Roma (1919) — built with González on a similar plan to Tonalá 90 but on a mid-block lot. Entry is through the garden and up a stair to a front terrace; the former dining room retains its leaded bay window. The street gateway appears to have been widened at some point to admit cars.

=== Grand residences ===
All seven stand on corner lots.

- Tonalá 66, corner of Tabasco, Roma (1912) — entered through a chamfered corner topped by an Art Nouveau balcony and a cartouche dated 1912; the walls are of rough-faced industrial brick that imitates rustication.
- Colima 174, corner of Orizaba, Roma (c. 1913) — the chamfered corner carries balconies with Art Nouveau ironwork, and the entrance on the side street is marked by a round window. Only the basement is faced in real stone; the rustication above is rendered.
- Córdoba 27, corner of Puebla, Roma (1914) — a chamfered corner with an arched salon window below the main bedroom balcony, crowned by a curved pediment; faced entirely in stone. The basement windows have since become shops.
- Avenida Chapultepec 180, corner of Flora, Roma (c. 1914–1916); Guanajuato 102, facing Plaza Luis Cabrera, Roma (1918); Tonalá 149, corner of Querétaro, Roma (c. 1919); and Copenhague 33, corner of Hamburgo, Juárez (c. 1920) — plainer houses with a single main floor over a street-level basement, now often used as restaurants. Stone is limited to cornices, lintels, balustrades and the entrance surround.

=== Half-cloister houses ===
- Guanajuato 97 and Tabasco 201, Roma (1919) — single-storey houses arranged around a C-shaped side courtyard, a type common in middle-class districts. The Guanajuato house is the more richly carved of the two.

=== Small middle-class houses ===
The 24 casitas pequeñoburguesas are Peñasco's most numerous type. They were built to a standard plan, and he appears to have drawn their ornament from a stock of models: the façades of Córdoba 23A and Colima 182 are almost identical.

- Wide-fronted (three bays): Plaza Río de Janeiro 46 (c. 1917), Tabasco 293 (1918), Durango 213 (1919), Plaza Río de Janeiro 50 (c. 1919) and Tonalá 145 and 147 (c. 1919), all in Roma, and Niza 17 in Juárez (c. 1920). The house at Río de Janeiro 46 was badly damaged in the 1985 Mexico City earthquake and threatened with collapse for two decades before it was restructured and restored, with new homes added behind it.
- Narrow-fronted (two bays): Tabasco 211 and 213 (c. 1912, sharing one inscription on their party wall), Tonalá 62 (c. 1912), Colima 176, 178 (c. 1912–1913), 180 and 182 (c. 1914–1916), Puebla 113 (1914), Córdoba 23A and 25 (1914) and 90 (1917), Flora 1A, Jalapa 125 and 127 and Avenida Chapultepec 178 (all c. 1914–1916), Valladolid 54 (1918) and Copenhague 28 in Juárez (c. 1920). The houses at Córdoba 90 and Valladolid 54 are singled out for their delicate ornament.

=== Mirrored pairs ===
- Colima 162 (c. 1919) and Tabasco 81 and 83 (1919), Roma — pairs of identical houses built as mirror images on adjoining lots, with entrances and garages paired at the centre.

=== Multi-family buildings ===
- Plaza Miravalle 3 and 5 (now Plaza Villa de Madrid), Roma (c. 1914) — an apartment building with shops on the ground floor and two upper floors united by colossal fluted pilasters.
- Tabasco 133, corner of Córdoba, Roma (1917) — in the manner of French classicism, it looks like a grand residence but has several street doors. The main apartment is entered through a large rusticated triumphal-arch portal.
- Córdoba 31–35, Roma (1912) — a privada of eight two-storey houses in three sizes around a central court; his earliest dated work and his only one in a neo-Gothic style, with exposed industrial brick and pointed arches.
- Jalapa 30–32, Roma (c. 1914–1916) — a plainer privada of eight houses on the same plan.

=== Attributed ===
- Valladolid 52, Roma — the Museo Soumaya credits Peñasco with the design of the façade in 1910; the house was built by the engineer-architect Manuel Francisco Álvarez for Roberto de J. Álvarez. The historian Guillermo Tovar de Teresa bought it in 1995, the INBA declared it an artistic monument, and since 2018 it has been the Casa Guillermo Tovar de Teresa museum. It does not appear among the signed works catalogued by San Martín Córdova.
