= Claudia Curiel de Icaza =

Mexican politician (born 1979)

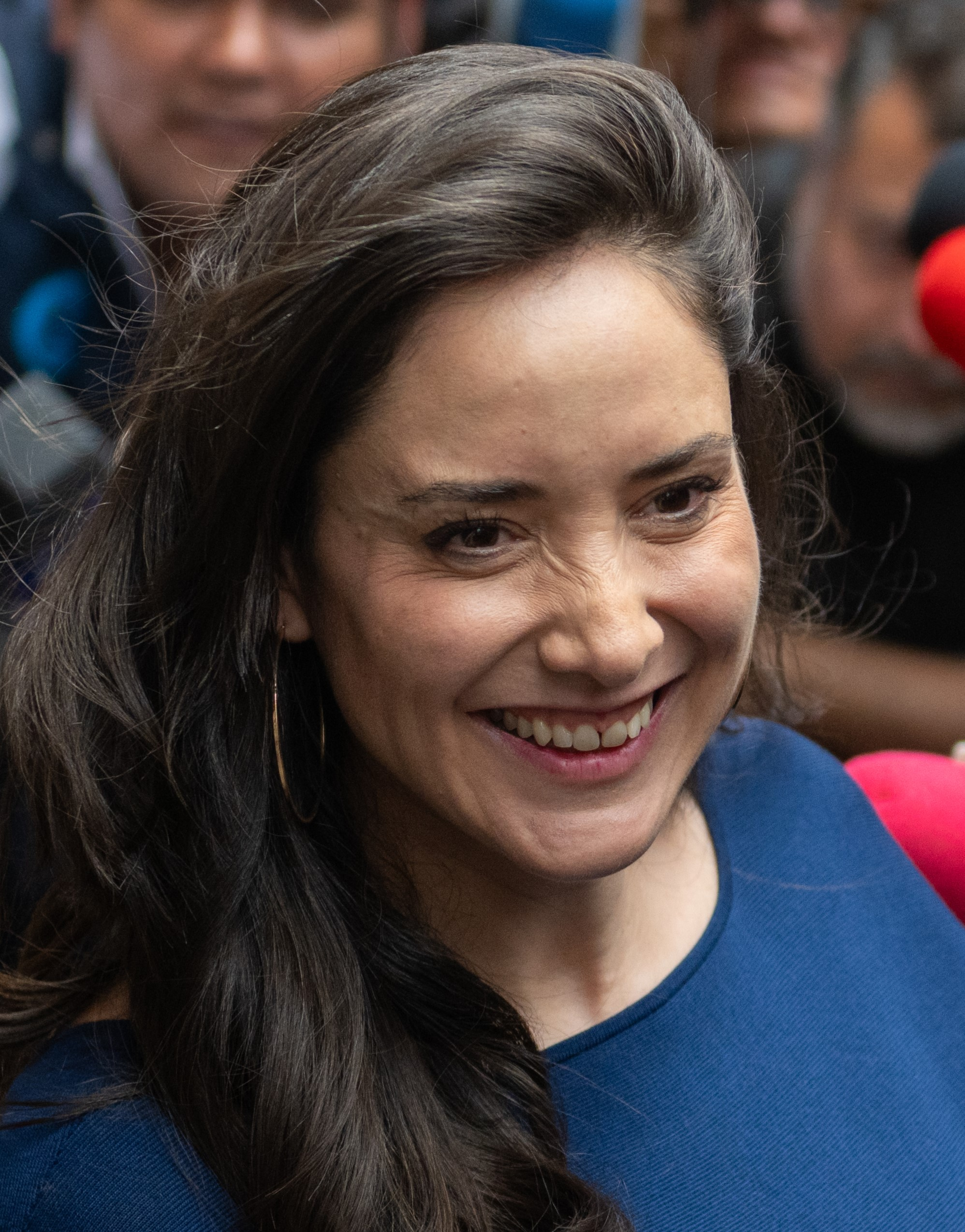
- Curiel de Icaza in 2024

Secretary of Culture
- Incumbent
- Assumed office 1 October 2024
- President: Claudia Sheinbaum
- Preceded by: Alejandra Frausto Guerrero

Personal details
- Born: 16 August 1979 (age 46)
- Party: Independent

Claudia Curiel de Icaza (born 16 August 1979) is a Mexican politician serving as secretary of culture since 2024. From 2022 to 2024, she served as secretary of culture of Mexico City.
