= Mortales la serie =

- Genre: Melodrama, Reality TV, TV Serial
- Developed by: Kevin Martinez
- Country of origin: Dominican Republic
- Original language: Spanish

Production
- Producer: Kevin Martinez
- Running time: 60 minutes (35 or 40 minutes without commercials)

Original release
- Network: Digital 15
- Release: February 11, 2000 – April 15, 2008

Mortales La Serie was a Hispanic television series that is transmitted in the Dominican Republic on Sundays at 11 pm through Telemicro channel 5, and for the rest of the world through Telemicro International on Saturday at 12 at night. It is also available through the web.

== First Season ==
In his first season "Mortal" I featured performances by Latino actors living abroad including Robmariel Olea, Xiomara Rodriguez, Matos Janeiro, Gus Scharr, Nicole Cucurullo, Olga Bucarreli, Mariluz Acosta, and Laura Lebron.

== History ==
Mortales, directed by Kevin Martínez, is a Dominican television series filmed between New York City and the Dominican Republic. It depicts the lives, hardships, and ambitions of Latino immigrants living in New York, featuring Hispanic media professionals and actors residing in the United States.

As associate producers Mr. Juan Ramon Gomez Diaz chairman of Telemicro media and Kevin Martinez, General Director of the series involved in the series.

== Data Sheet ==
- Address \ Gral production: Kevin Martinez
- Cinematographer: Andrés Zapata
- Production: Betty Belle Batista
- Logistics: Esteffany Márquez
- Art Direction: Diana Victoria USA \ Jose Sanchez RD
- Fixed Photography: Victor Cucart
