= Guillermo Tovar y de Teresa =

Mexican art historian (1956–2013)

Guillermo Tovar y de Teresa (August 23, 1956 – November 10, 2013) was a Mexican historian and art collector (mainly of painting, literature and ancient books, and deeply knowledgeable about photography), bibliographer, philanthropist, cultural promoter, and scholar. He was a constant defender of historical and artistic Mexican heritage, mainly of his hometown in Mexico City, for which he was a formally appointed chronicler, an office originally appointed by the President of Mexico and from which he resigned to propose the creation of the Council of the Chronicle of the City of Mexico. He was a specialist in New Spain/Mexican colonial period art, history and literature. He published several books about colonial Mexican art and collaborated with the newspaper La Jornada, among others.

Tovar y de Teresa stood out for his precocious intelligence: he learned to read long before entering school, and at age 13 he served as a colonial art advisor to Mexican President Gustavo Díaz Ordaz. At 23, he published his first book, Renaissance Painting and Sculpture in Mexico. He was a member of the Historical Center Executive Committee, a corresponding member of the Royal Academy of Fine Arts of San Fernando in Madrid, and an honorary member of the Hispanic Society of America in New York City. He was considered a candidate for the Aesthetic Research Institute of the National Autonomous University of Mexico (UNAM), but never wanted to hold a public office or receive a salary. One of his brothers, Rafael Tovar y de Teresa, served from 2012 as head of the National Council for Culture and the Arts and as the first Secretary of Culture. In December 2018, his house became part of the Soumaya Museum.

== Early years ==
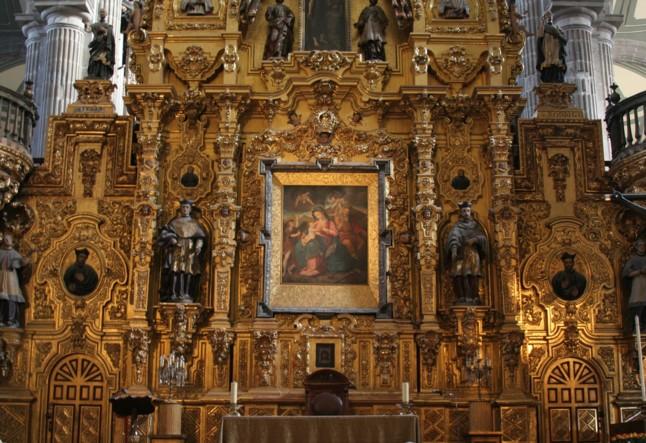
Detail of the Altar del Perdón, in the Metropolitan Cathedral of Mexico City. The scholarly comments of Guillermo Tovar de Teresa at the age of 11 with Mexican President Gustavo Díaz Ordaz about the fire in a structure and his criticism of the restoration efforts made him deserving of the official appointment of Counselor in Colonial Art, with a payment of a centenary.

Tovar y de Teresa learned to appreciate history and art books from a very young age, thanks to his grandfather, Guillermo de Teresa y Teresa, and his father, Dr. Rafael Tovar y Villa Gordoa, his "guardian figures". He said that "his grandfather had taught him to read in the pages of the newspaper... Self-taught by choice (I decided to train on my own (...) I was bored), lived away from universities." At the age of seven he received "a medal in recognition of his dedication to the study of Mexican history and art" from then-President Adolfo López Mateos. At age 11 he was invited by the historian Jorge Gurría Lacroix to collaborate at the National Institute of Anthropology and History. At age 12 he was appointed advisor to President Gustavo Díaz Ordaz in matters of colonial art. At 14, he had already given his first lectures at the Institute of Aesthetic Research of the UNAM, and at a very young age he received a distinction from the Real Academia de Bellas Artes de San Fernando in Madrid. At 16 he concluded his formal investigation into the history of Tacubaya, which was published years later as Historical news of the Miguel Hidalgo Delegation.

=== Genealogy ===
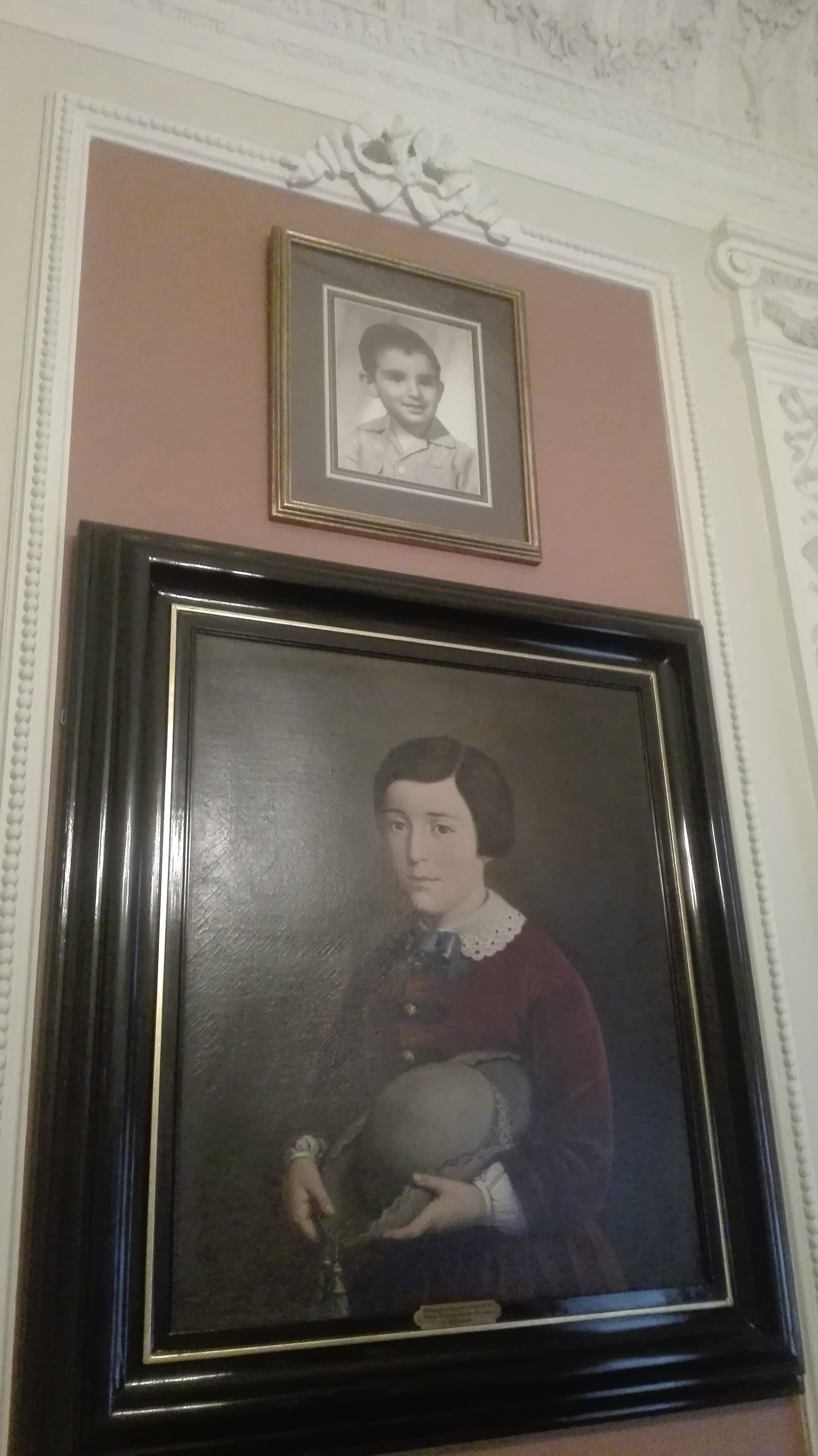
Portrait of Guillermo Tovar de Teresa in his childhood, in the museum Guillermo Tovar de Teresa House (Valladolid 52, Colonia Roma, Mexico City).

Tovar de Teresa was interested in investigating all the branches of his ancestry and traced his lineage back through some of the largest and oldest families in New Spain. In 2012, he submitted a request to succeed in the title of count of Gustarredondo, which was litigated in Spain asking rights of possession. Upon Tovar de Teresa's death, his nephew, Rafael Tovar y López-Portillo, son of Rafael Tovar y Teresa, director of Conaculta and grandson of President José López Portillo, requested the subrogation of the rights of his uncle in that title, because he is the firstborn. Guillermo Tovar de Teresa was a great-grandson of Margarita López-Portillo y Rojas, who was in turn the sister of the lawyer, novelist, poet, playwright, journalist, language scholar and governor of the State of Jalisco José López Portillo y Rojas. Tovar de Teresa was also the maternal nephew of the writer José Bernardo Couto and the maternal great-great-grandson of the writer José Joaquín Pesado.

There is no sacred art (...) where there has been a liberal reform

— Guillermo Tovar de Teresa

== Topics addressed in his works ==
His teachers were authors of the canonical works of our history and literature I knew by heart Lucas Alamán, Fray Servando Teresa de Mier, Carlos María de Bustamante, Joaquín García Icazbalceta, Herrera, Juana Inés de la Cruz, Vicente Riva Palacio and he could recite them at once.

— Rafael Tovar and Teresa, about his brother.

Tovar de Teresa primarily wrote about the art, culture and history of Mexico, especially during the Baroque period and the Viceregal era. He wrote about Mudéjar architecture and carpentry in New Spain, the organs and altarpieces of the Metropolitan Cathedral of Mexico City, the historic center of Mexico City, and

- Gerónimo de Balbás
- Miguel Cabrera
- Photographer's, he was a deep connoisseur of the works by Julio Michaud, Désiré Charnay and Alfred Briquet
- Luis Lagarto
- New Spanish nuns
- Viceroyalty of New Spain utopia

== The Council of the Chronicle of Mexico City ==
Constituted before a notary and registered in the Tax Administration Service, this organization received on August 14, 2007 authorization from the Directorate of Legal Affairs of National Institute of Fine Arts to start their functions. Chaired from 2012 to date by Román Sánchez Fernández.

=== Chronicle Council Publications ===
The publisher Editorial Trama, of Madrid, is formally the publisher of the Chronicle Council of Mexico City. Some of his publications are the following:

- In 2007, he published, together with the Secretariat of Education of the Federal District, the book Ciudad de México: Crónica de sus delegaciones (Mexico City: Chronicle of its delegations). It includes a presentation by Guillermo Tovar de Teresa and, at the end, an article by Carlos Monsiváis, one of the council members, along with Jesús Ramírez Cuevas. The climax is from Salvador Flores.
- In 2009, he published Ciudad de México: Crónica de sus delegaciones (Censorship and revolution: Books prohibited by the Inquisition of Mexico: 1790–1819), by the authorship of Guillermo Tovar de Teresa and the doctor in history and specialist in nineteenth-century Mexico Cristina Gómez Álvarez. This is an edition by the Windward collection.

== Collecting and other interests ==
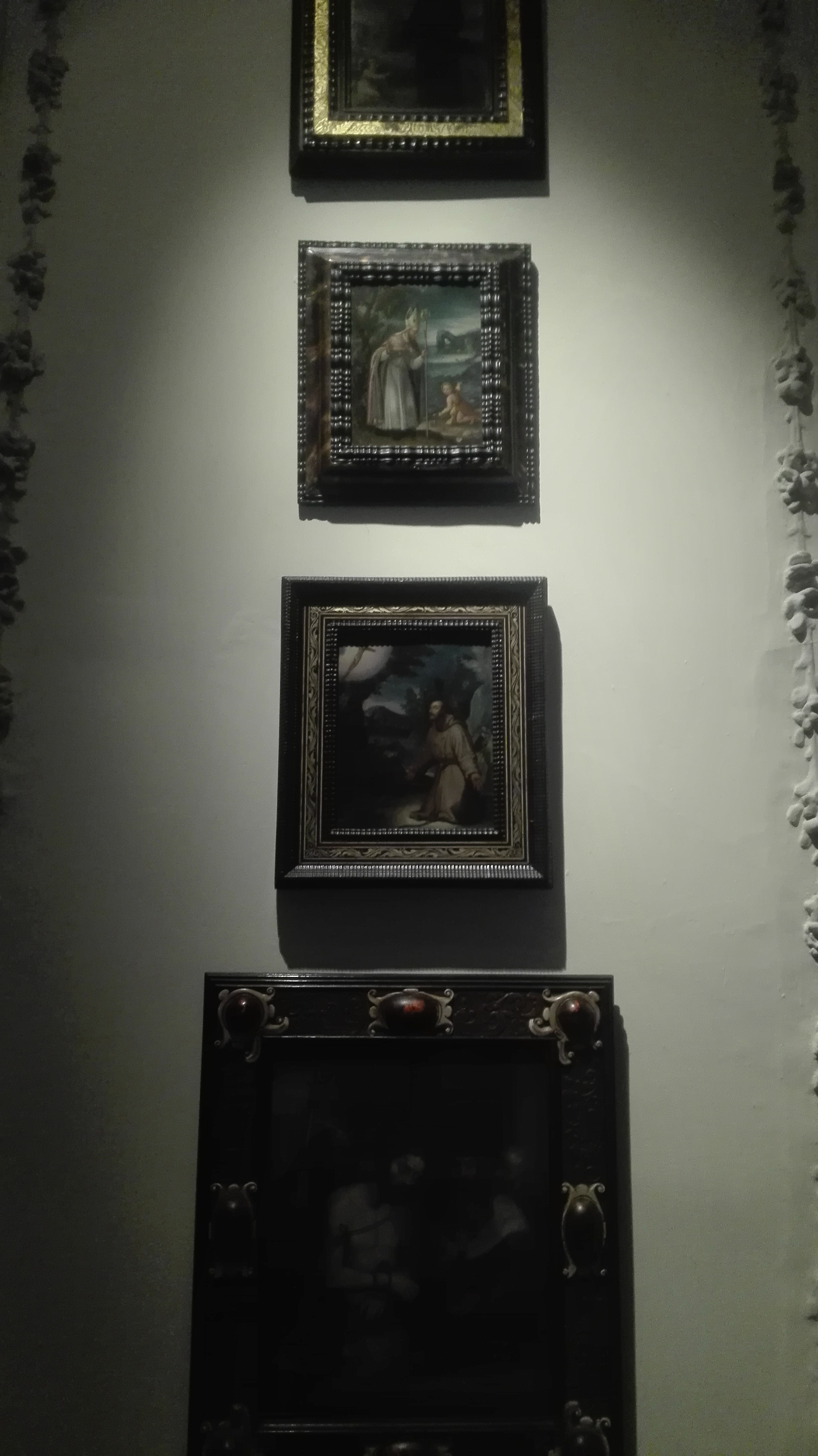
Art works in his house museum Casa Guillermo Tovar de Teresa (Valladolid 52, Colonia Roma, Cuauhtémoc City Hall, Mexico City ).

- He had, within his vast collection of books, "first editions of (works of) Sor Juana Inés de la Cruz", and also "the founding book of Mexico City", an incunable: the treaty of architecture of Leon Battista Alberti (the edition of 1512, of Paris), with annotations by the Viceroy himself Antonio de Mendoza y Pacheco.
- He worked as an advisor, before 1983, of Juan José Bremer in the Undersecretariat of Culture, after having also worked with Pedro Ramírez Vázquez.
- He headed, next to the restaurateur Lucía Ruanova Abedrop, the citizen group "El Caballito, Conservación", a restoration plan, which he defended, for the damages suffered during his restoration, of the Equestrian statue of Charles IV of Spain in Mexico city knowns as El Caballito, by Manuel Tolsá.
- He opened in Facebook a group that made a proactive space where he continuously difussed his musical, artistic, historical interests.
- He was an advisor, since its inception, on the project for the foundation of Casa Lamm.
- He gave a keynote speech on the occasion of the LXXXV anniversary of the foundation of the Miguel Lerdo de Tejada Library.

«We Mexicans (...) have a bad habit of devouring ourselves, of destroying ourselves after the conquest.»

— Guillermo Tovar de Teresa

== Other acknowledgments ==
- Citizen Merit Medal, awarded by the Assembly of Representatives of the Federal District.
- Commander's Cross of the Royal Order of Saints Mauritius and Lazarus, of Royal House of Savoy (2007).

=== Post Mortem ===
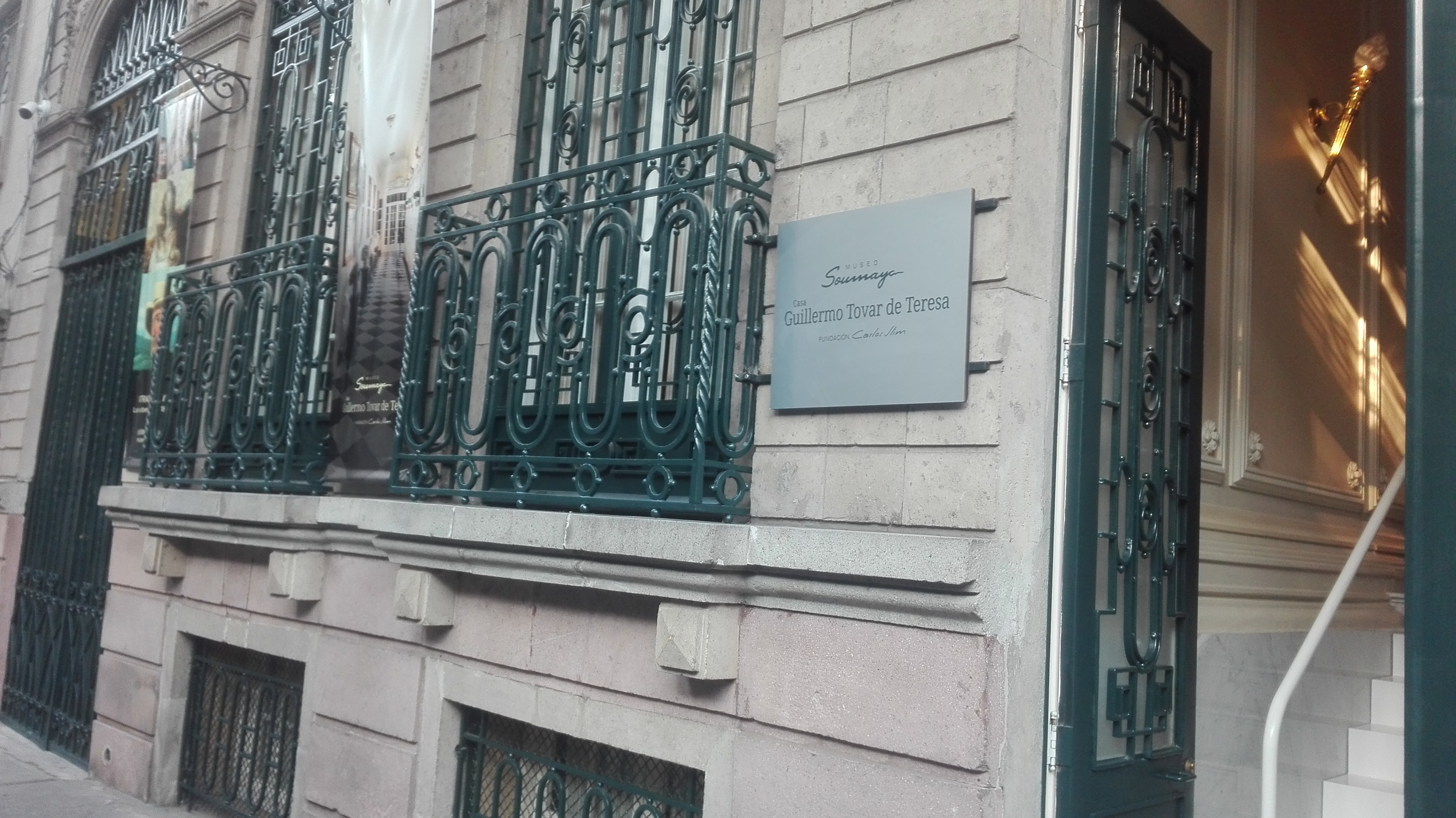
Museum facade of the Guillermo Tovar de Teresa House. (Valladolid 52, Colonia Roma, Cuauhtémoc City Hall, Mexico City).

- A tribute to him was held in the Auditorium "Jaime Torres Bodet", of the National Museum of Anthropology, conducted by the Mexican government on February 13, 2014, and headed by Emilio Chuayffet Chemor, Secretary of Public Education.
- His brothers decided to create the Guillermo Tovar de Teresa Award, which will recognize, every two years, the trajectory of a Mexican whose work seeks to preserve the heritage of Mexico.
- On August 6, 2014 a tribute was held in his memory at the Museum of Mexico City. The event, which included the inauguration of the bookstore number 24th of the Fondo de Cultura Económica, which will bear its name in its memory, was held in the Museum of Mexico City, and was organized by the Ministry of Culture of the Federal District Government. Among others were: the president of the National Council for Culture and the Arts, Rafael Tovar y de Teresa, the director of the Fondo de Cultura Económica, José Carreño Carlón, the writer Homero Aridjis.
- On December 20, 2018, it was announced that the home of Guillermo Tovar de Teresa would be the Guillermo Tovar de Teresa House in the street Valladolid 52, Colonia Roma Norte), a cultural site where the Soumaya Museum is located, sponsored by the Slim Foundation.

== Bibliography ==
=== Authorship ===
He published (some co-authored, but most individually) a total of 39 works in 44 volumes, including:

- Pintura y escultura del Renacimiento en México (Painting and sculpture of the Renaissance in Mexico) (1979)
- Noticias históricas de la Delegación Miguel Hidalgo (Historical news of the Miguel Hidalgo Delegation
- México barroco (Baroque Mexico) (1981)
- Apuntes y fotografías de México a mediados del siglo XIX – Álbum fotográfico mexicano – 1858– fotografías de Désiré Charnay (Notes and photographs of Mexico in the mid-19th century – Mexican photo album – 1858– photographs of Désiré Charnay published by Julio Michaud Publisher: Celanese mexicana) (1981)
- Renacimiento en México: artistas y retablos (Renaissance in Mexico: artists and altarpieces) (1982)
- La ciudad de México y la utopía en el siglo XVI (Mexico City and utopia in the 16th century) (1987)
- El arte de los Lagarto, iluminadores novohispanos de los siglos XVI y XVII (The art of the Lagarto, New Spanish illuminators of the 16th and 17th centuries) (1988)
- Bibliografía novohispana de arte (New Spanish bibliography of art) (two volumes, 1988)
- Miguel Cabrera, pintor de cámara de la reina celestial (Miguel Cabrera, chamber painter of the celestial queen) (1985)
- Gerónimo de Balbás en la Catedral de México (Gerónimo de Balbás in the Cathedral of Mexico) (1990)
- Los escultores mestizos del Barroco novohispano (The mestizo sculptors of the New Spanish Baroque) (1991)
- Pintura y escultura en Nueva España (Painting and sculpture in New Spain (1557–1640)) (four volumes, 1992)
- La ciudad de los palacios (The city of palaces) Publisher: Vuelta, (1990); prologue by Enrique Krauze
- Arte novohispano (New Spanish art) (three volumes, 1992)
- La utopía novohispana del siglo XVI: lo bello, lo verdadero y lo bueno (The 16th-century New Spanish utopia: the beautiful, the true and the good) (1992, in collaboration with Miguel León-Portilla and Silvio Zavala)
- Repertorio de artistas en México: artes plásticas y decorativas (Directory of artists in Mexico: plastic and decorative arts (three volumes, 1995)
- Cartas a Mariano Otero: 1829–1845 (Letters to Mariano Otero: 1829–1845) (1996)
- Catálogo de la colección de ex libris de Guillermo Tovar de Teresa (Collection catalog of ex libris by Guillermo Tovar de Teresa) (2002)
- La ciudad de los palacios: crónica de un patrimonio perdido (The city of palaces: chronicle of a lost heritage)
- La ciudad: un palimpsesto (The city: a palimpsest) (2004)
- El Pegaso o el mundo barroco novohispano en el siglo XVII (The Pegasus or the baroque world of New Spain in the 17th century (1993, reissue 2006)
- Crónica de una familia entre dos mundos: los Ribadeneira en México y España (Chronicle of a family between two worlds: the Ribadeneira in Mexico and Spain) (2009)
- Diccionario de artistas del siglo XX (Dictionary of artists of the twentieth century) (the new edition, which would include artists born before 1955, was being prepared)

=== Editions of the Council of the Chronicle of Mexico City ===
- Coedition Council of the Chronicle of Mexico City – National Council for Culture and the Arts – National Institute of Fine Arts – National Conservatory of Music of facsimile of Memories of Mexico, piano scores composed by Luis Hahn with the original lithographs of the covers of the pieces. It includes a compact disc with the interpretation of the pieces (recording in Sala Nezahualcóyotl) by Silvia Navarrete. Introductory text "The lithographs of (M. C.) Rivera in the scores of Luis Hahn", by Guillermo Tovar and Teresa. Proem of María Teresa Franco. Memories of 'an appreciable pianist', or Mexico City seen from the piano, by Ricardo Miranda. Mexico. 2008. ISBN 9786077622130

=== Other collaborations ===
- Prologue of the book Luis G. Jordá. A Catalan musician in Porfirian Mexico, by Cristian Canton Ferrer (2011)
- Text in the volume of photographs Mexico 1910–1921: an imaginary of the Mexican Revolution . Process. 2010.
- Prologue of the book: Kahlo, G., and Greenwood Peabody, H. (2009). "Two views of the monumental architecture of Mexico." Mexico: Salinas Group.
- "La portada principal de la primitiva Catedral de México" In Collection of studies in tribute to Mariano Fernández Daza, IX Marquis de la Encomienda. Modesto Miguel Rangel Mayoral. Santa Ana de Almendralejo University Center, 2009.
- Presentation of Manual de la gente bien, by Guadalupe Loaeza (1995).
- Compilation of Bordados y bordadores, by Virginia Armella de Aspe (1992).

=== About Guillermo Tovar de Teresa ===
- Guzmán Urbiola, Xavier (2013). Guillermo Tovar de Teresa: biobibliographic sketch . Mexico: DGE / Equilibrista.

=== Unpublished ===
- History of Mexico

== See also ==
- Rafael Tovar y de Teresa
- Soumaya Museum
- Conservation and restoration
- Historiography
- Iconography
- La Profesa (Oratory of San Felipe Neri)
- Francisco Cervantes de Salazar (16th century chronicler)
- Luis González Obregón (chronicler of Mexico City until 1937)
- Miguel León-Portilla (chronicler of Mexico City in 1974 and 1975)
- José Luis Martínez (chronicler of Mexico City from 1975 to 1985)
- Franz Mayer Traumann (German-Mexican collector)
- Carlos Monsiváis (chronicler of Mexico City)
- Salvador Novo (chronicler of Mexico City until 1974)
- Artemio de Valle Arizpe
