= Secretary of State (Mexico) =

Government cabinet position in Mexico

In the United Mexican States, the federal executive power of the government is exercised by the president of the republic whose official denomination is Constitutional President of the United Mexican States, to carry out the development of its powers and functions, the president has the power to freely appoint members of his cabinet, each of which is the head of a secretariat of state that is responsible for a branch of the federal public administration; and the organization of these agencies and the powers that each have, are set by the Organic Law of the Federal Public Administration (in Spanish).

The federal public administration is centralized and parastatal in accordance with the organic law issued by the Congress, which distributes the administrative business of the federation among the state secretaries who constitute the cabinet in Mexico. The Secretaries of State are appointed by the President of the United Mexican States. The President may convene the meetings of secretaries of state and other competent officials when it comes to defining or evaluating the policy of the Federal Government in matters that are the concurrent competence of several agencies, or entities of the federal public administration.

== Features ==
- The secretaries of state have equal rank.
- Each secretary of state formulates (with respect to the matters of the competence of the secretariat of which she or he heads) the draft laws, regulations, decrees, agreements, and orders of the president of the republic.
- Each secretary of state is the administrative head of a secretariat of state (equivalent to an executive ministry or department), who will assist the sub-secretaries, senior official, directors, deputy directors, chiefs and deputy heads of the department, office, section and table, and the other officials established by the respective internal regulations and other legal provisions.
- The various secretaries of state are responsible for the processing and resolution of the matters within their competence; but for the best organization of the work they may delegate to the officials referred to in article 14 of the organic law of the federal public administration, any of its faculties, except those that by law or the respective internal regulation, must be exercised precisely by said secretaries of state.
- Each secretary of state is to conduct his or her activities in a programmed manner, based on the policies established by the federal executive for the achievement of the objectives and priorities of national development planning.

== Requirements to be a secretary of state ==
^^. The holders of the delegations will be appointed by the head of the respective agency or entity and will have the powers indicated by their internal regulations or the legal regulations for the creation of parastatal entities.

In addition, they must meet at least the following requirements:

- Be a Mexican citizen by birth and be in full enjoyment and exercise of their civil and political rights.
- Have academic studies in subjects related to the attributions that correspond to the respective delegation;
- Have held positions of high decision-making level, whose exercise requires knowledge and experience in administrative matters, and
- Not having been sentenced for patrimonial crimes or being unable to perform a job, position or commission in the public service.

CHANGES:

- Present before the Congress of the Union the initiatives of law or decree of the Executive.
- Publish the laws and decrees of the Congress of the Union, one of the two Chambers or the Permanent Commission and the regulations issued by the President of the Republic, in terms of the provisions of the first section of Article 89 of the Constitution, as well as the resolutions and provisions that by law must be published in the Official Gazette of the Federation.
- Administer and publish the Official Gazette of the Federation.
- Formulate and conduct population policy, except for colonization, human settlements and tourism.
- Manage the national service of personal identification.
- Process regarding the application of Article 33 of the Constitution.
- To process matters related to the exercise of the powers granted to the Federal Executive by articles 96,98 and 100 of the Constitution, regarding appointments, resignations and licenses of the Ministers of the Supreme Court of Justice and of the Counselors of the Federal Judiciary.
- Process everything related to the appointments, removals, resignations and licenses of the Secretaries of State and the Attorney General of the Republic.
- Intervene in the appointments, approvals, appointments, dismissals, resignations and retirements of public servants that are not expressly attributed by law to other dependencies of the Executive.
- Keep the autograph record of the federal officials and the Governors of the States and legalize their signatures.
- Administer the islands of federal jurisdiction, except those whose administration corresponds, by law, to another agency or entity of the federal public administration. In the islands referred to in the preceding paragraph, federal laws and treaties shall govern; they will be competent to know about the controversies that arise in them the federal courts with greater geographical proximity.
- Conduct the internal policy that competes the Executive and is not expressly attributed to another agency.
- Monitor the compliance of constitutional precepts by the authorities of the country, especially with regard to individual guarantees and dictate the administrative measures necessary for that purpose.
- Conduct, provided that this power is not conferred to another Secretariat, the relations of the Executive Power with the other Powers of the Union, with the autonomous constitutional bodies, with the governments of the federative entities and the municipalities and with the other federal authorities and local, as well as render the official information of the Federal Executive.
- Conduct the relations of the federal government with the Federal Court of Conciliation and Arbitration of Workers in the Service of the State.
- To conduct, within the scope of its competence, the political relations of the Executive Power with national parties and political groups, with social organizations, with religious associations and other social institutions.
- Encourage political development, contribute to the strengthening of democratic institutions; promote active citizen participation and favor the conditions that allow the construction of political agreements and social consensus so that, under the terms of the Constitution and laws, the conditions of democratic governance are maintained.
- Monitor compliance with constitutional and legal provisions regarding public worship, churches, groups and religious associations.
- Administer the General Archive of the Nation, as well as monitor compliance with the legal provisions regarding information of public interest.
- Exercise the right of expropriation for reasons of public utility in those cases not entrusted to another agency.
- Monitor that printed publications and radio and television broadcasts, as well as cinematographic films, remain within the limits of respect for privacy, peace and public morals and personal dignity, and do not attack the rights of third parties, nor provoke the commission of any crime or disturb public order.
- Regulate, authorize and monitor the game, bets, lotteries and raffles, in the terms of the relative laws.
- Compile and order the rules that impose modalities on private property, dictated by the public interest.
- Conduct and implement, in coordination with the authorities of the governments of the states, the Federal District, with the municipal governments, and with the dependencies and entities of the Federal Public Administration, the policies and programs of civil protection of the Executive, in the framework of the National System of Civil Protection, for the prevention, assistance, recovery and support to the population in disaster situations and to reach agreements with institutions and organizations of the private and social sectors, actions conducive to the same objective.
- Formulate, regulate, coordinate and monitor policies to support the participation of women in the various areas of development, as well as promote inter-institutional coordination for the implementation of specific programs.
- Set the official calendar.
- Formulate, regulate and conduct the social communication policy of the Federal Government and relations with the mass media.
- Guide, authorize, coordinate, supervise and evaluate the social communication programs of the dependencies of the Federal Public Sector.
- Establish and operate a research and information system that contributes to preserve the integrity, stability and permanence of the Mexican State.
- Contribute in what corresponds to the Executive of the Union, to give sustenance to the national unit, to preserve the social cohesion and to strengthen the institutions of government.
- Compile and systematize laws, international treaties, regulations, decrees, agreements and federal, state and municipal dispositions, as well as establish the corresponding data bank, in order to provide information through electronic data systems.
- The others expressly attributed to the laws and regulations.

== Secretariats of state ==
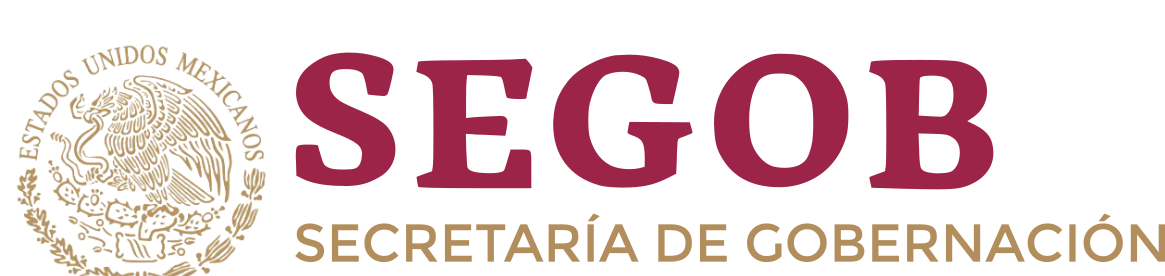
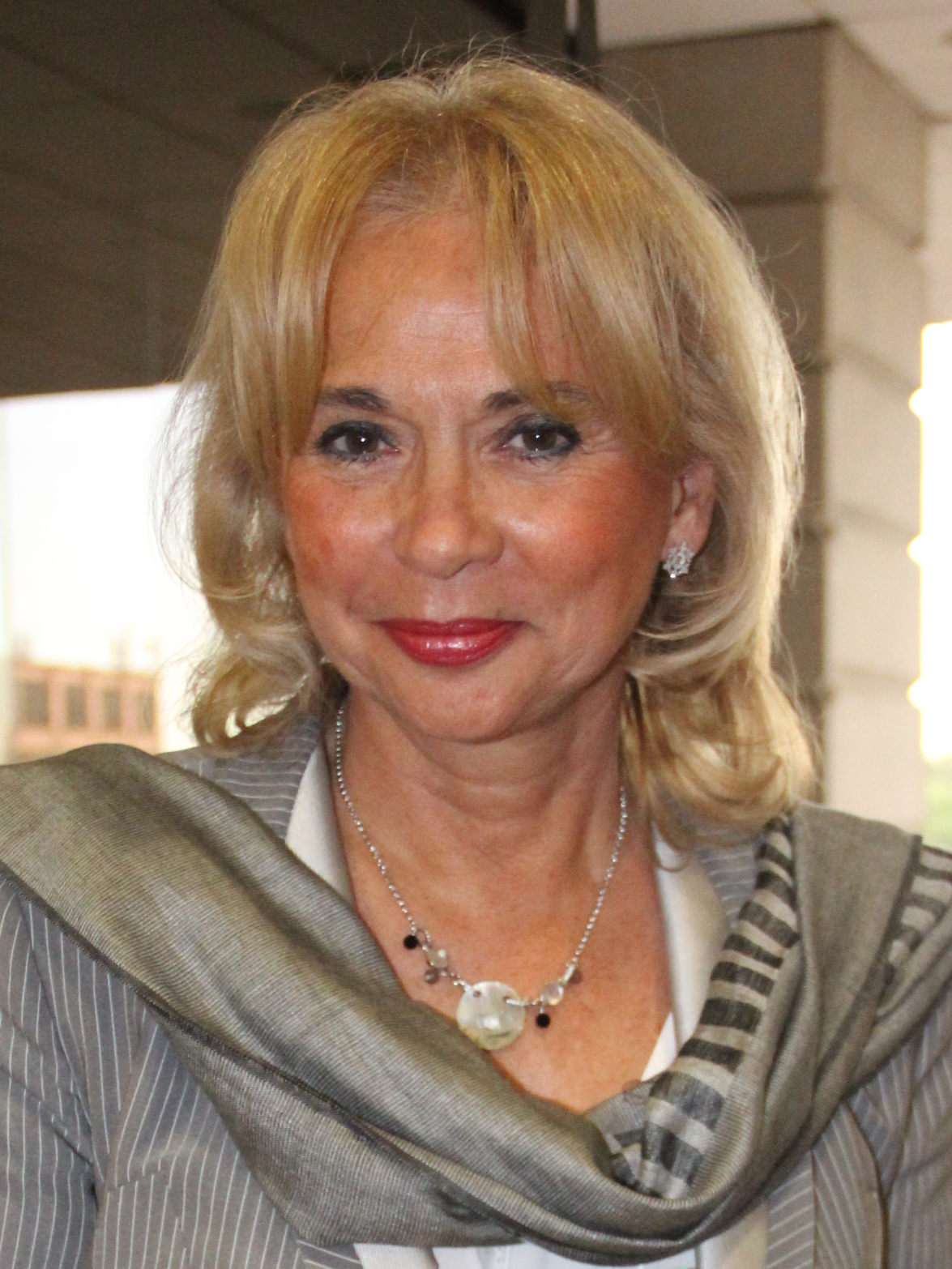
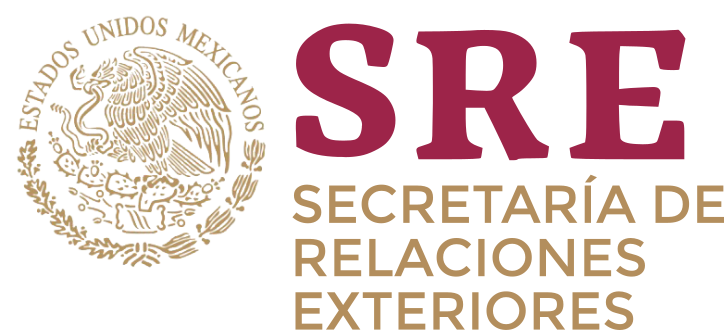
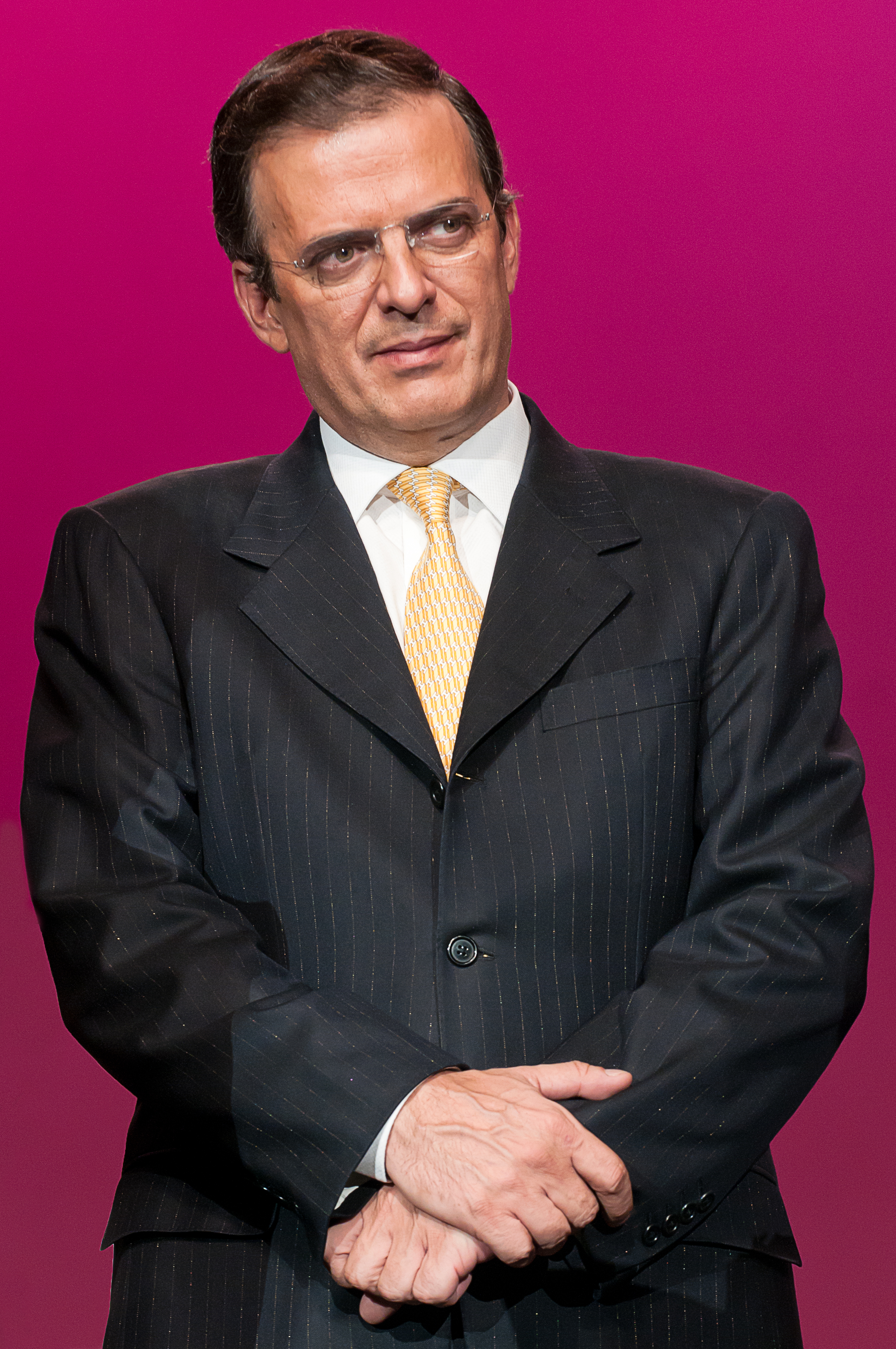
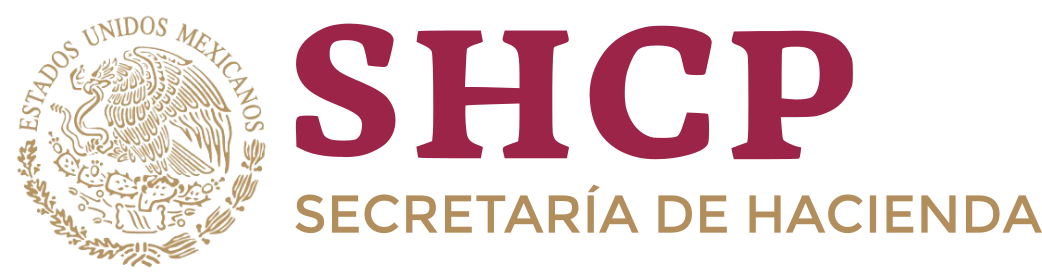
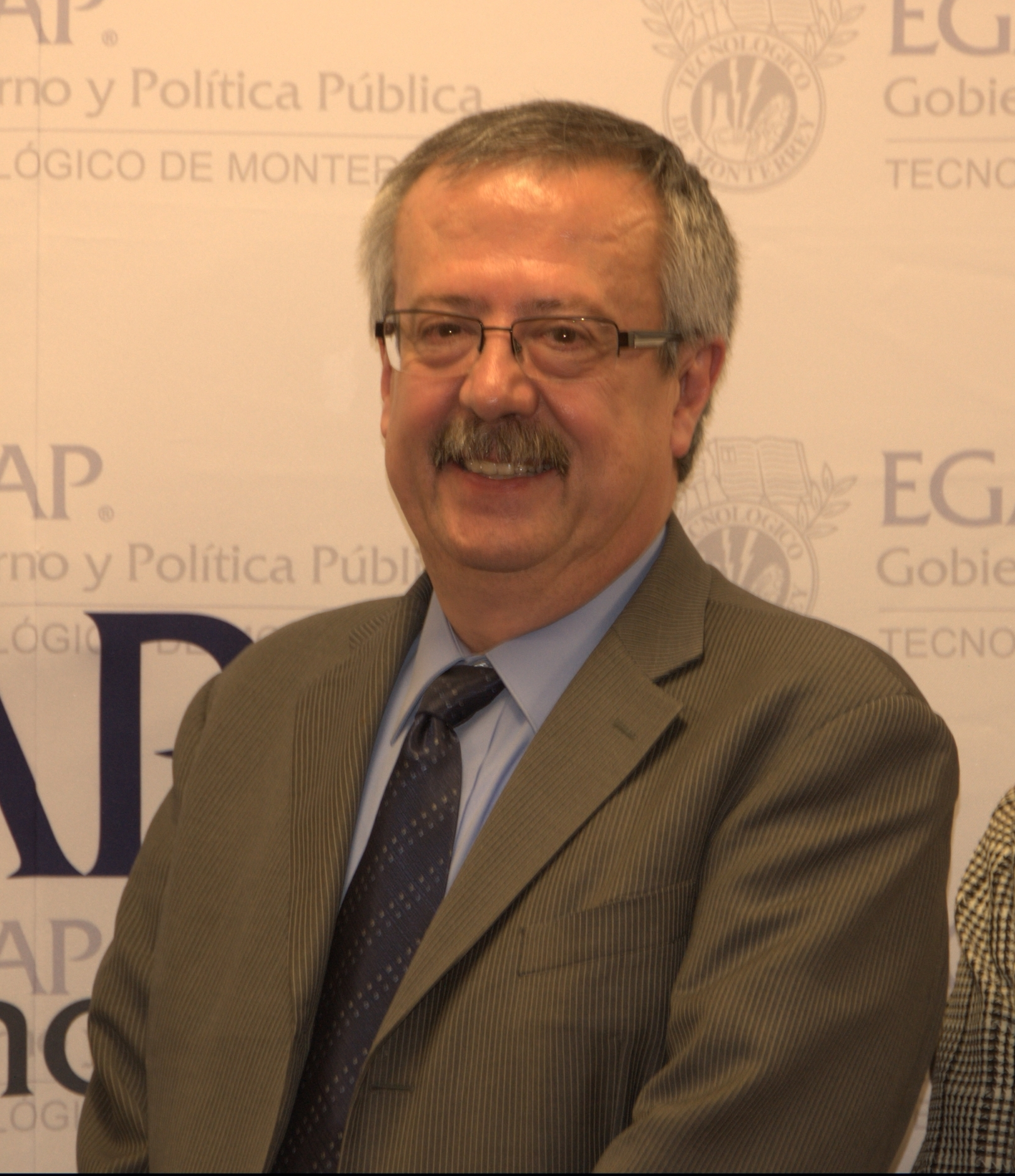
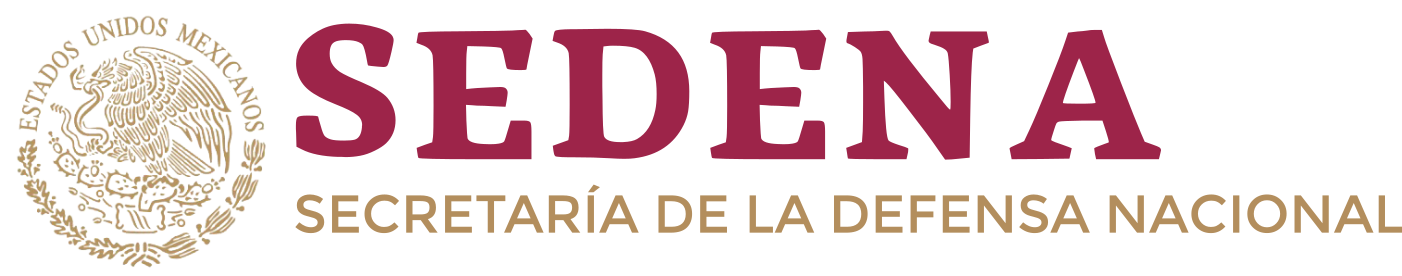
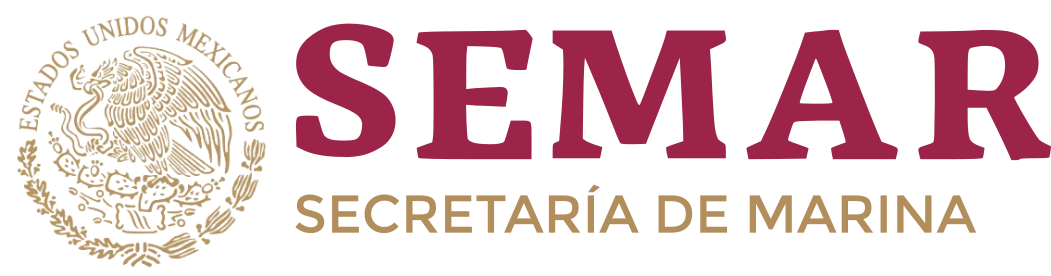
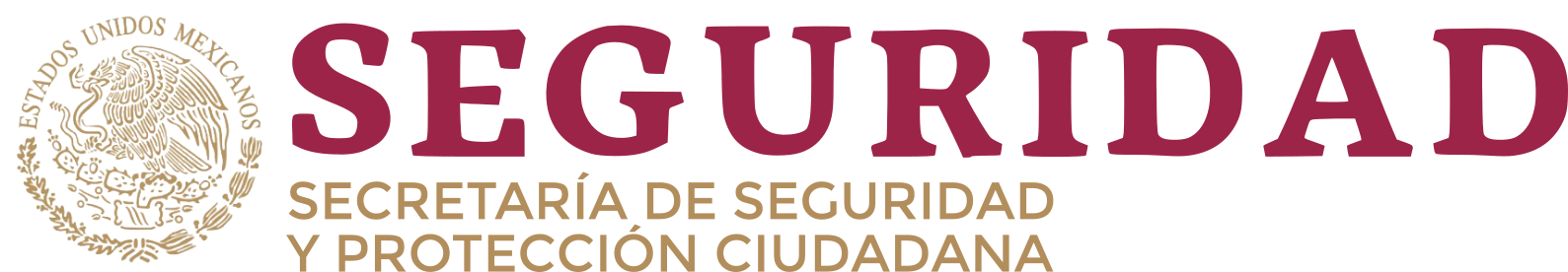
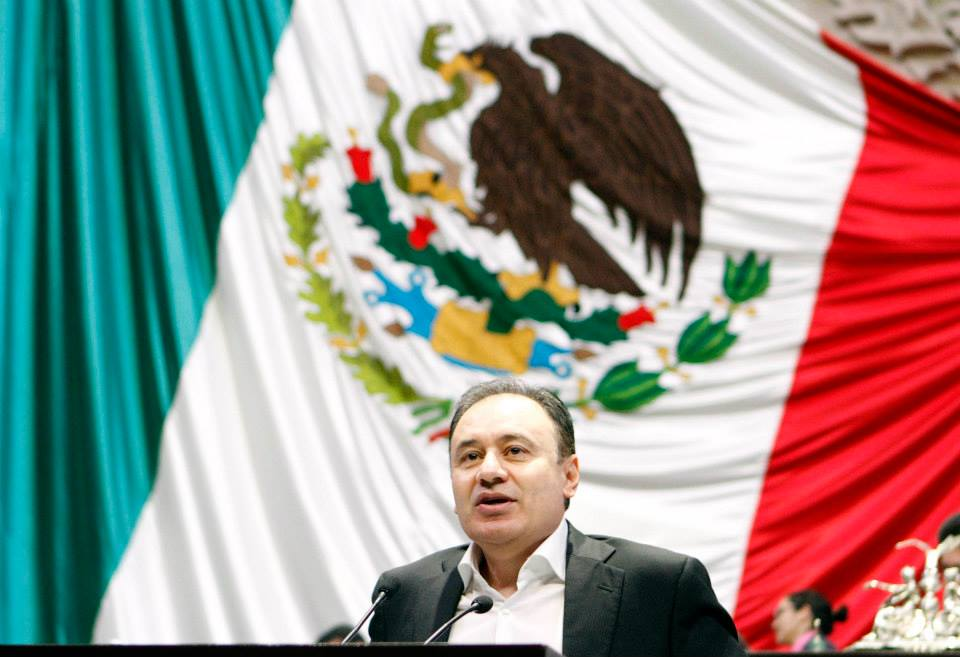
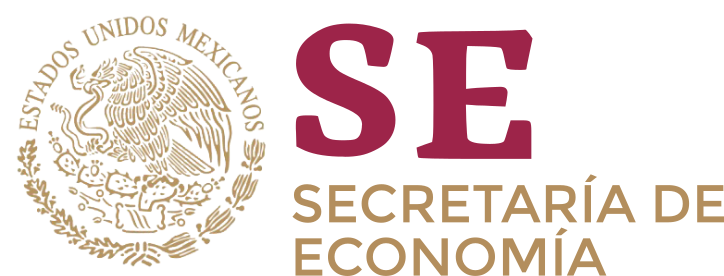
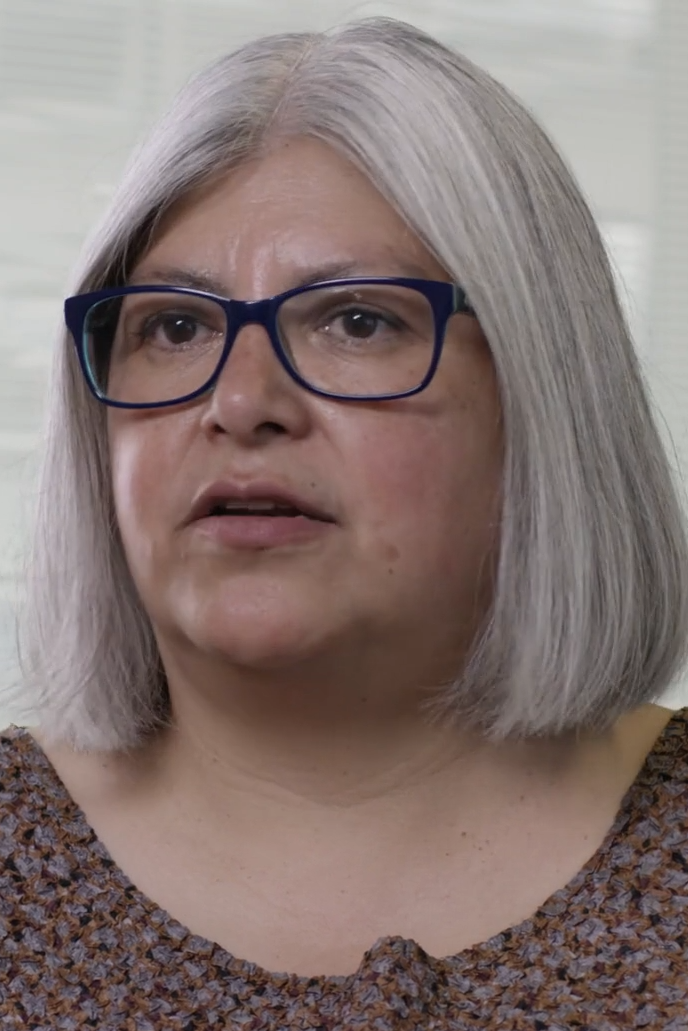
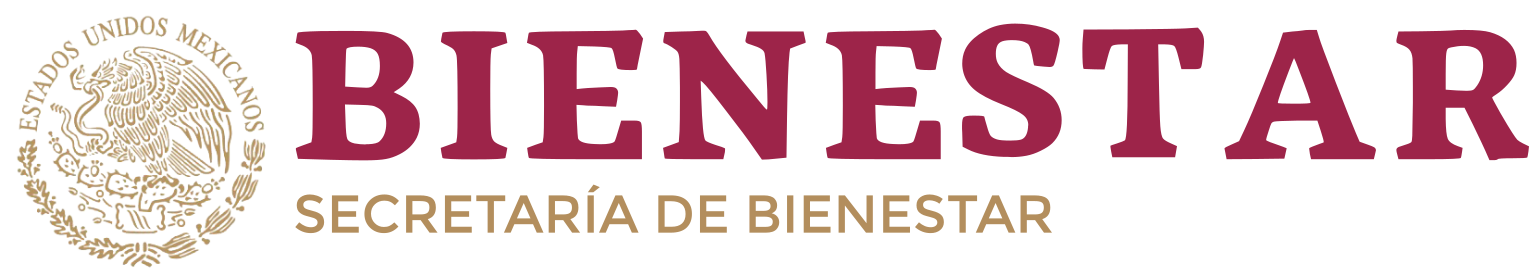
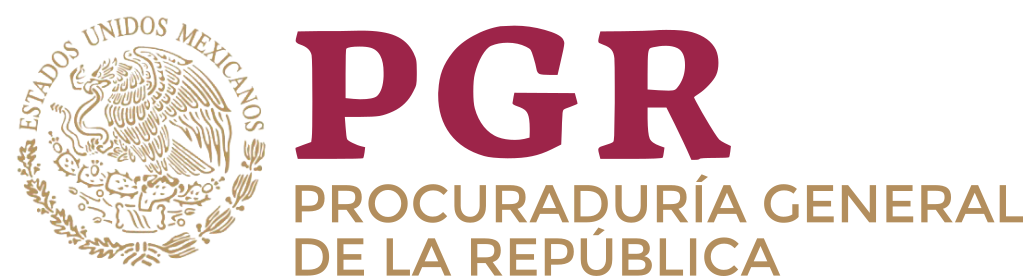
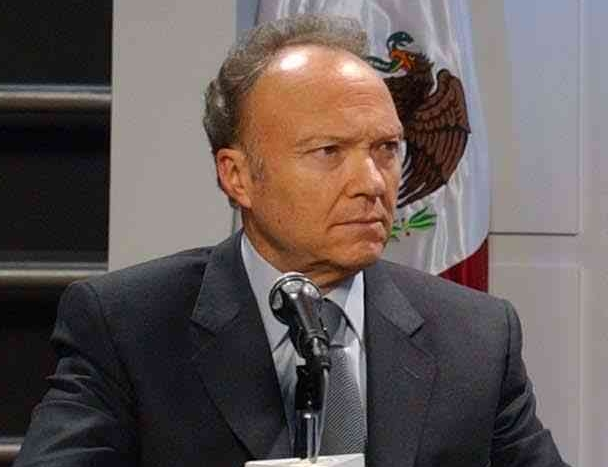
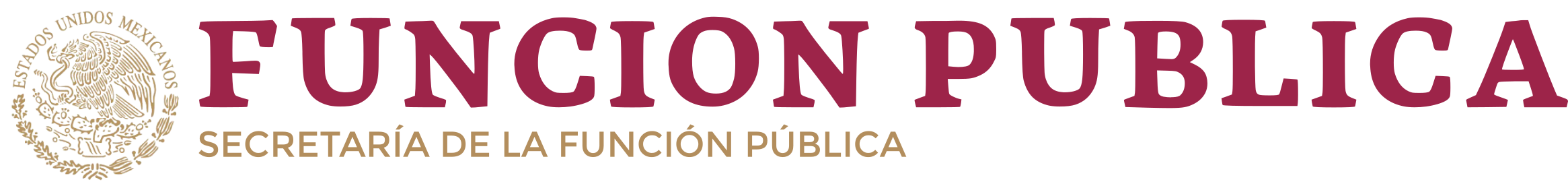
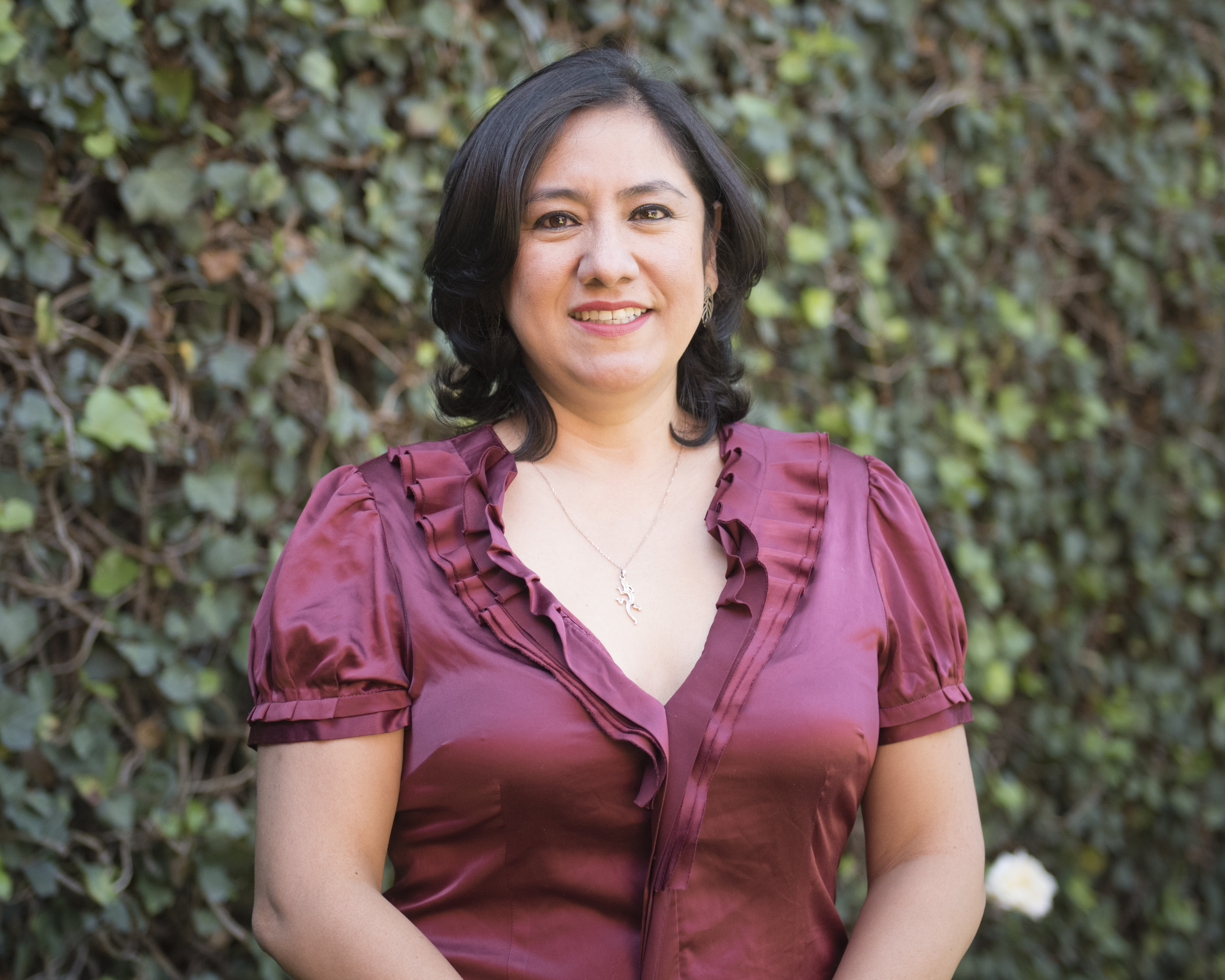
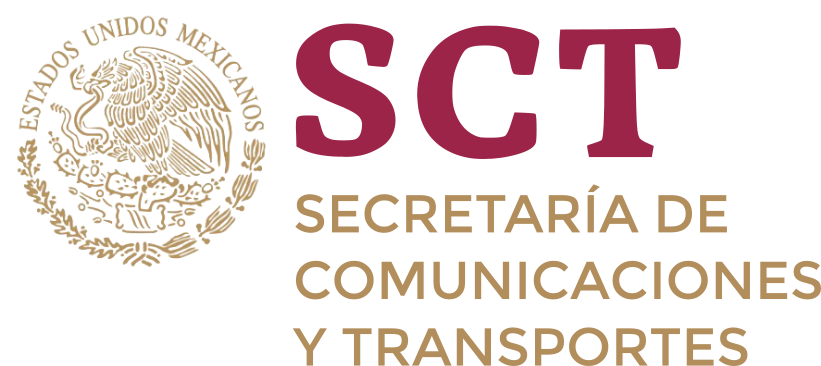
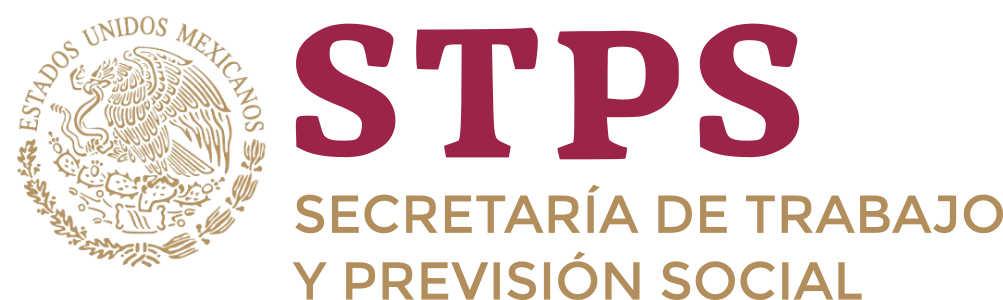
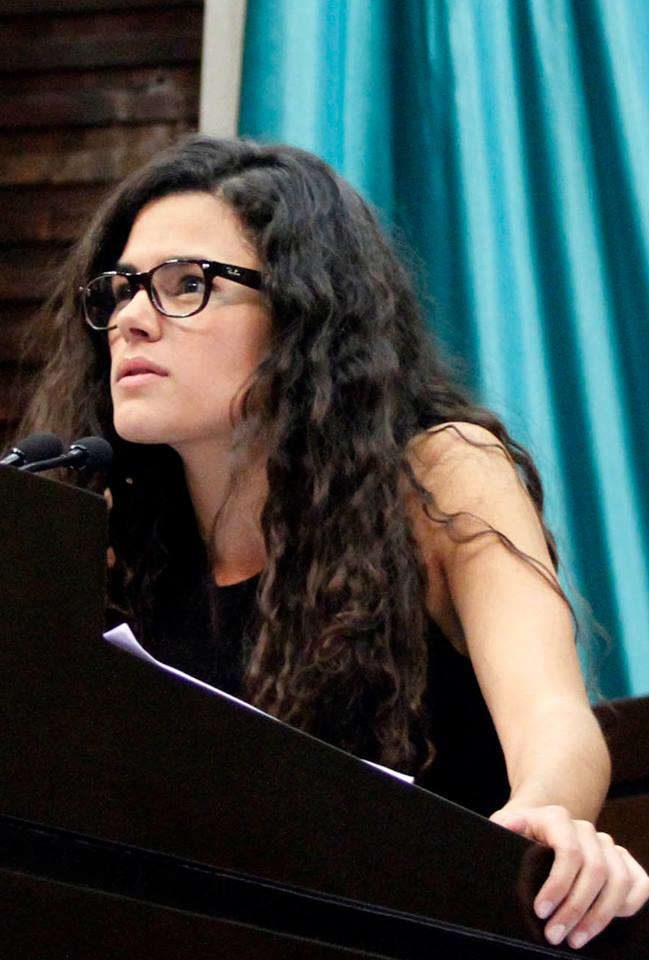
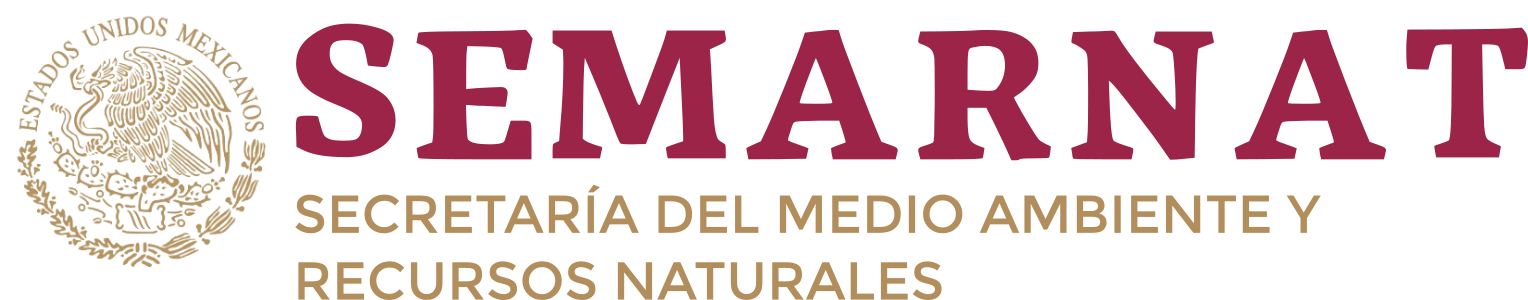
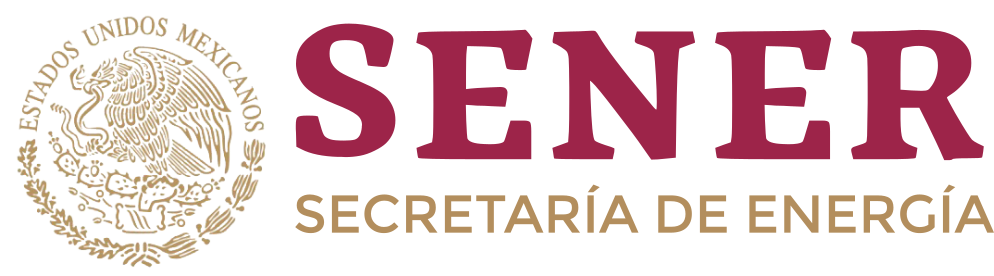
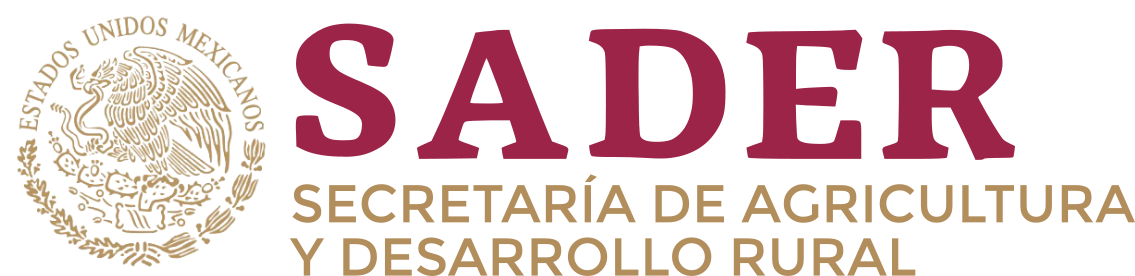
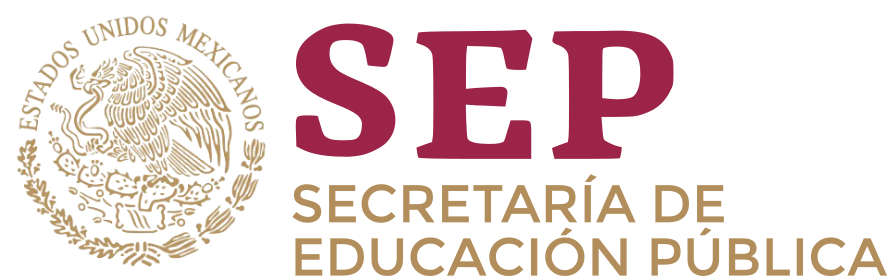
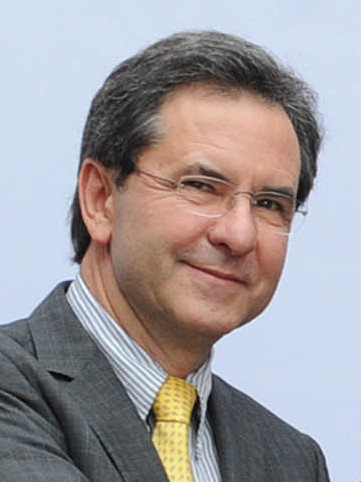
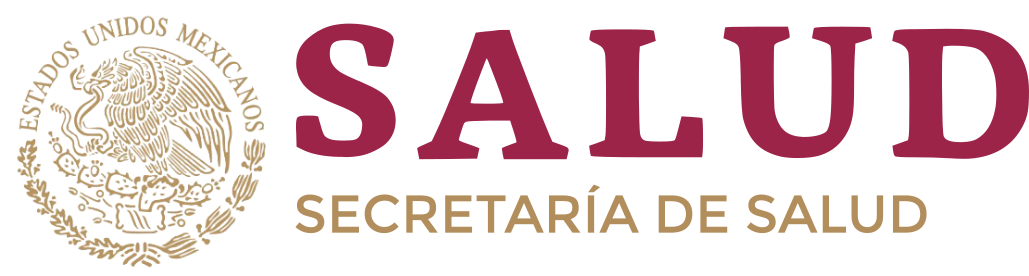
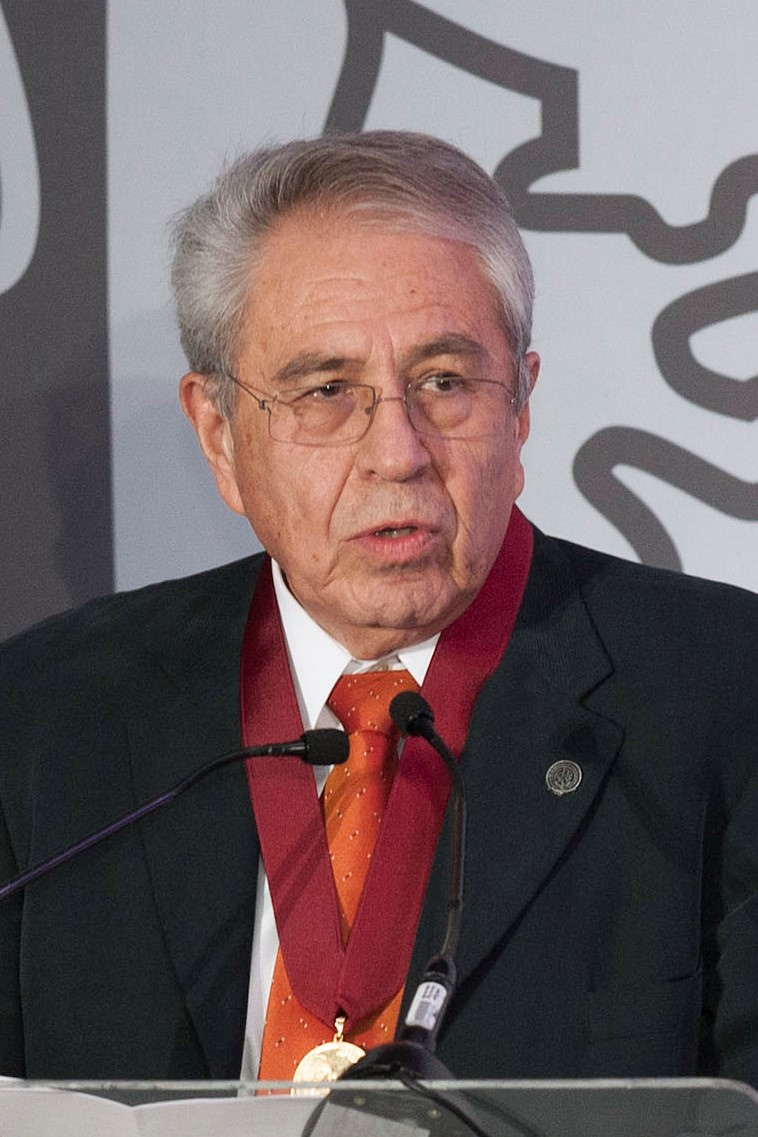
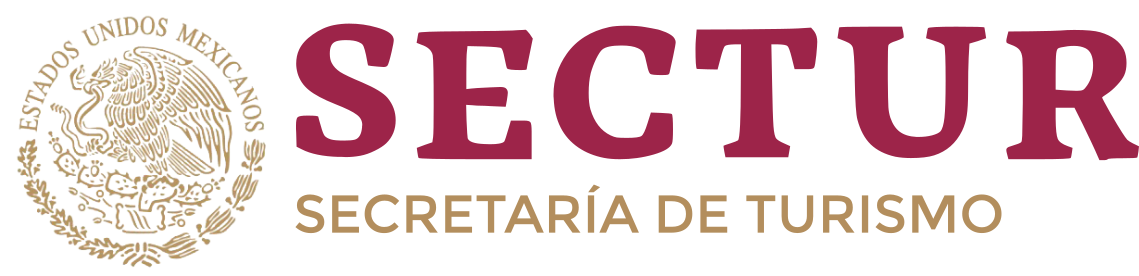
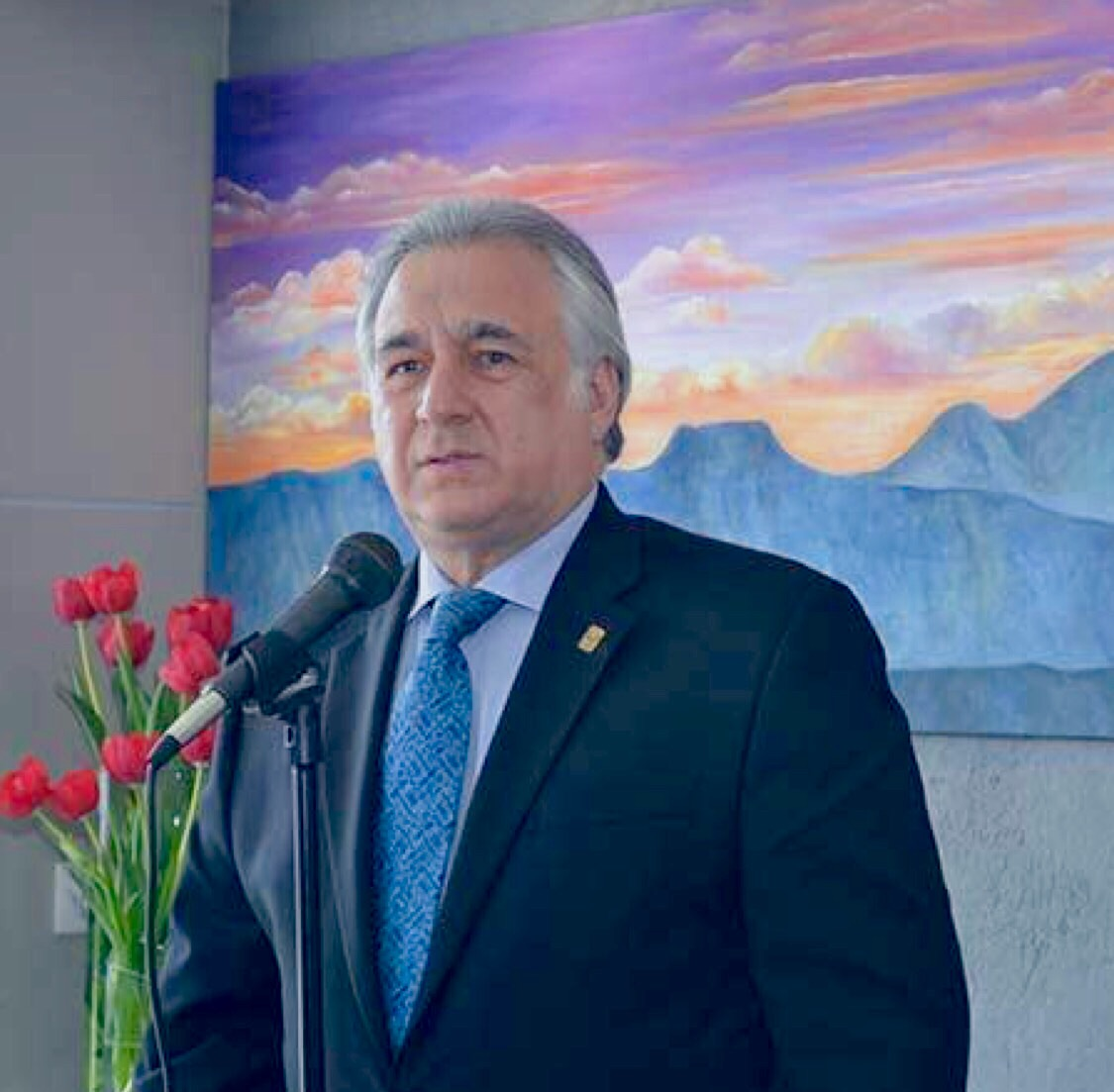
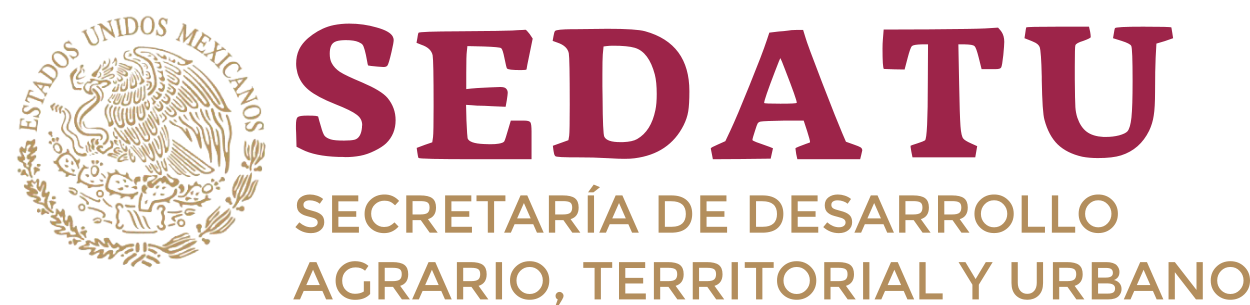
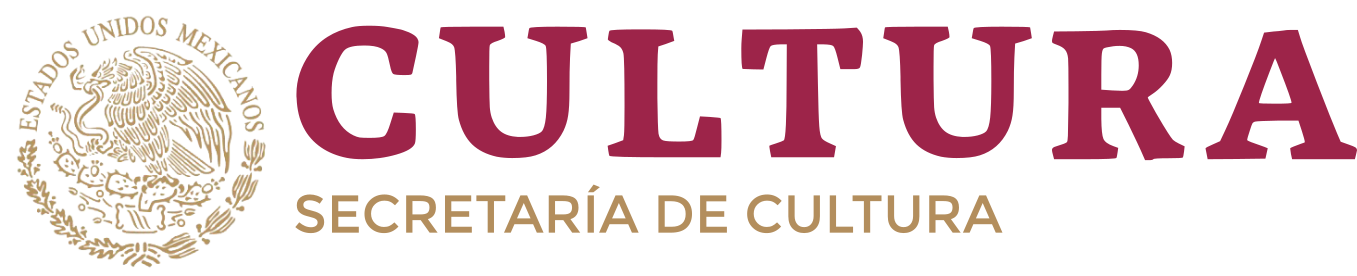
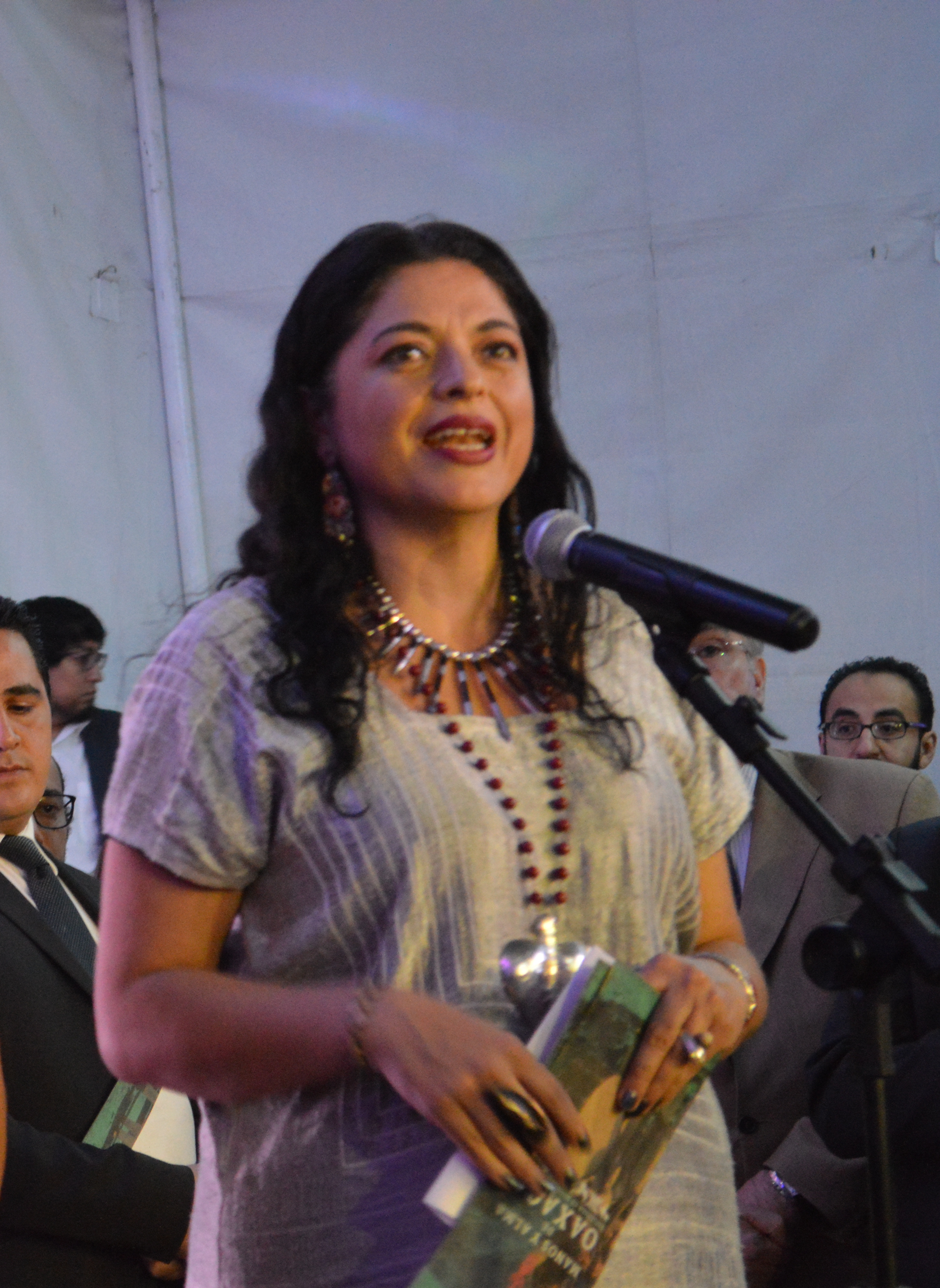
Department	Head of Department	Incumbent	Image	In Office since
Secretariat of the Interior (Spanish: Secretaría de Gobernación)	Secretary of the Interior (Spanish: Secretaria de Gobernación)	Olga Sánchez Cordero (b. 1947)		1 December 2018
Secretariat of Foreign Affairs (Spanish: Secretaría de Relaciones Exteriores)	Secretary of Foreign Affairs (Spanish: Secretario de Relaciones Exteriores)	Marcelo Ebrard (b. 1959)		1 December 2018
Secretariat of Finance and Public Credit (Spanish: Secretaría de Hacienda y Crédito Público)	Secretary of Finance (Spanish: Secretario de Hacienda)	Carlos Manuel Urzúa Macías (b. 1955)		1 December 2018
Secretariat of National Defense (Spanish: Secretaría de la Defensa Nacional)	Secretary of Defense (Spanish: Secretario de Defensa)	Luis Cresencio Sandoval (b. 1960)		1 December 2018
Secretariat of Navy (Spanish: Secretaría de Marina)	Secretary of Navy (Spanish: Secretario de Marina)	José Rafael Ojeda Durán (b. 1954)		1 December 2018
Secretariat of Security and Civilian Protection (Spanish: Secretaría de Seguridad y Protección Ciudadana)	Secretary of Security (Spanish: Secretario de Seguridad)	Alfonso Durazo (b. 1954)		1 December 2018
Secretariat of Economy (Spanish: Secretaría de Economia)	Secretary of Economy (Spanish: Secretaria de Economía)	Graciela Márquez Colín (b. 1963)		1 December 2018
Secretariat of Welfare (Spanish: Secretaría de Bienestar)	Secretary of Welfare (Spanish: Secretaria de Bienestar)	María Luisa Albores González (b. 1976)		1 December 2018
Attorney General Spanish: Fiscalía General de la República	Attorney General Spanish: Fiscal General de la República	Alejandro Gertz Manero (b. 1939)		1 December 2018
Secretariat of the Civil Service Spanish: Secretaría de la Función Pública	Secretary of the Civil Service Spanish: Secretaria de la Función Pública	Irma Sandoval-Ballesteros (b. 1972)		1 December 2018
Secretariat of Communications and Transportation (Spanish: Secretaría de Comunicaciones y Transportes)	Secretary of Communications (Spanish: Secretario de Comunicaciones)	Javier Jiménez Espriú (b. 1937)		1 December 2018
Secretariat of Labor and Social Welfare (Spanish: Secretaría del Trabajo y Previsión Social)	Secretary of Labor (Spanish: Secretaria del Trabajo)	Luisa María Alcalde Luján (b. 1987)		1 December 2018
Secretariat of the Environment and Natural Resources (Spanish: Secretaría de Medio Ambiente y Recursos Naturales)	Secretary of Environment (Spanish: Secretaria de Medio Ambiente)	Josefa González Blanco Ortíz Mena (b. 1965)		1 December 2018
Secretariat of Energy (Spanish: Secretaría de Energía)	Secretary of Energy (Spanish: Secretaria de Energía)	Rocío Nahle García (b. 1964)		1 December 2018
Secretariat of Agriculture and Rural Development (Spanish: Secretaría de Agricultura y Desarrollo Rural)	Secretary of Agriculture (Spanish: Secretario de Agricultura)	Víctor Manuel Villalobos Arámbula (b. 1950)		1 December 2018
Secretariat of Public Education (Spanish: Secretaría de Educación Pública)	Secretary of Education (Spanish: Secretario de Educación)	Esteban Moctezuma (b. 1954)		1 December 2018
Secretariat of Health (Spanish: Secretaría de Salud)	Secretary of Health (Spanish: Secretario de Salud)	Jorge Alcocer Varela (b. 1946)		1 December 2018
Secretariat of Tourism (Spanish: Secretaría de Turismo)	Secretary of Tourism (Spanish: Secretaria de Turismo)	Miguel Torruco Marqués (b. 1951)		1 December 2018
Secretariat of Agrarian, Land, and Urban Development Spanish: Secretaría de Desarrollo Agrario, Territorial y Urbano	Secretary of Agrarian Development and Urban Planning Spanish: Secretario de Desarrollo Agrario, Territorial y Urbano	Román Meyer Falcón (b. 1983)		1 December 2018
Secretariat of Culture Spanish: Secretaría de Cultura	Secretary of Culture Spanish: Secretaria de Cultura	Alejandra Frausto Guerrero		1 December 2018

== Former secretariats of state ==
Many secretariats have been changing their name with the passage of time, as a reflection of the change that each president intends to exercise on the government, its priorities and changes of programs and objectives, however some Secretariats have disappeared completely, their faculties being absorbed by another dependence, these are the following cases:

- Secretariat of Public Instruction and Fine Arts (SIPBA), incorporated into Education in 1914.
- Secretariat of Hydraulic Resources (SRH), incorporated to Agriculture in 1976.
- Programming and Budget Secretariat (SPP), incorporated to the Treasury and INEGI in 1992.
- Secretariat of Fisheries (SEPESCA), incorporated to the extinct SEMARNAP (today SEMARNAT) and the CONAGUA in 1994 and later in 2000 to the SAGARPA.
- Secretariat of Public Security (SSP), incorporated into the Secretariat of the Interior in 2013.
- Secretariat of the Agrarian Reform (SRA), incorporated to the Secretariat of Agrarian, Territorial and Urban Development in 2013.

== List of presidential cabinets of Mexico ==
- (1920–1924): Cabinet of Álvaro Obregón
- (1924–1928): Cabinet of Plutarco Elías Calles
- (1928–1930): Cabinet of Emilio Portes Gil
- (1930–1932): Cabinet of Pascual Ortiz Rubio
- (1932–1934): Cabinet of Abelardo L. Rodríguez
- (1934–1940): Cabinet of Lázaro Cárdenas del Río
- (1940–1946): Cabinet of Manuel Ávila Camacho
- (1946–1952): Cabinet of Miguel Alemán Valdés
- (1952–1958): Cabinet of Adolfo Ruiz Cortines
- (1958–1964): Cabinet of Adolfo López Mateos
- (1964–1970): Cabinet of Gustavo Díaz Ordaz
- (1970–1976): Cabinet of Luis Echeverría Álvarez
- (1976–1982): Cabinet of José López Portillo
- (1982–1988): Cabinet of Miguel de la Madrid
- (1988–1994): Cabinet of Carlos Salinas de Gortari
- (1994–2000): Cabinet of Ernesto Zedillo Ponce de León
- (2000–2006): Cabinet of Vicente Fox Quesada
- (2006–2012): Cabinet of Felipe Calderón Hinojosa
- (2012–2018): Cabinet of Enrique Peña Nieto

== See also ==
- President of Mexico
- Politics of Mexico
