= Olea (name) =

Olea is a surname but can also be a feminine given name. Notable people with the name include:

== Given name ==
- Olea Crøger (1801–1855), Norwegian music teacher
- Olea Marion Davis (1899–1977), Canadian artist and craftsperson

== Surname ==
- Ana González Olea (1915–2008), Chilean actress
- Cristina Olea (born 1982), Spanish journalist
- Francisco de Paula León Olea (born 1951), Mexican musician, author, and businessman
- Jorge Carrillo Olea (born 1937), Mexican politician and general
- Marco Olea (born 1979), Chilean footballer and manager
- Pedro Olea (born 1938), Spanish screenwriter, film producer, and film director
- Raquel Olea (born 1944), Chilean writer and professor
- Ricardo A. Olea, Chilean American geostatistician
- Robmariel Olea, Dominican actress, singer and TV host
- Romeo Olea (1962–2011), Filipino radio commentator
- Xavier Olea Muñoz (1923–2015), Mexican lawyer, prosecutor, diplomat, and politician
