= Robmariel Olea =

Dominican actress, singer and TV host

Robmariel Olea is a Dominican actress, singer and TV host who has been involved in films, musical theatre, and television.

Robmariel started hosting several popular TV shows such as Boruga Fat Free (Prime time TV show in Dominican Republic) and Mango en Directo broadcast by Mango TV. Later on she hosted El Show del Medio Día (a daily prime time show running for more than 40 years aired on Color Visión), and she also hosted/produced Entrando por la Cocina. In addition, her presence in the Dominican television includes popular TV mini-series like Al Filo De La Vida and she was part of Mariasela Álvarez’s weekly program Esta Noche Mariasela, where she had her own segment called Lo Que No Se Ve. She hosted such popular prime time radio shows as Con las Pilas Puestas and Botando el Golpe (This radio show was a very popular variety program and talk show.)

As a singer, she worked in noteworthy concerts such as Sonido para una Imagen, Disco Forever, "Michael Jackson’s Tribute" and in the national breast cancer awareness campaign "Caminantes por La Vida," among others. Besides singing she also produced the shows "Funky Divas" and "Robmariel, Muy Básico".

She began her acting career with the leading roles Carmen Jones and Serena in the famous musical Fame, in its Latin American Tour, under Jaime Azpilicueta's direction, a successful Spanish director. Fame toured Latin America (Venezuela, Colombia, Argentina, Puerto Rico, Dominican Republic and Mexico) for two years. In musical theater, she worked with some of the most renowned producers in the D.R among which are Nuryn Sanlley, Fidel López and Amaury Sánchez. She played the role of Velma von Tussle in Hairspray and appeared in Cabaret as the main character Sally Bowles, as Mary Magdalene in Jesus Christ Superstar, as Liesl Von Trapp in The Sound of Music, as Miss Farrell in Annie, and as Babette in Beauty and the Beast. The aforementioned roles generated wonderful articles and reviews, which highlighted Robmariel's work. She also worked with producer Guillermo Cordero in Fiddler on the Roof (as Tzeitel) and was directed by María Castillo in Edward Albee’s Pulitzer Prize-winning play Three Tall Women produced by the American Embassy in the Dominican Republic.

In 2002, she had great success producing and acting in theatre with the solo show El Último Instante and later on the play Palabras Encadenadas, both of which received great praise from the public.

Subsequently, in 2003, as a result of her outstanding acting performance, Robmariel received a Casandra Award for Best Actress for her work in the solo show El Último Instante. She has been nominated in the same category for three consecutive years; she was even nominated for two different plays in the same year (Palabras Encadenadas and Fiddler on the Roof in 2010; Cabaret in 2009; Regalo de Navidad in 2008) She was also nominated for the plays Cárcel de Mujeres and El Último Instante. She appeared in the motion picture production Un Macho de Mujer directed by Alfonso Rodriguez and in the German TV series Auf Wiedersehen, Pet. She was also involved in Mortales. .

In her most recent project, Casting Express directed by Leonard Zelig, Robmariel played the character of Sonia Ibarra, and her performance led to standing ovations from the audience. This last play was presented in the First Venezuelan Theater Festival in New York City.
