= Alejandra Frausto Guerrero =

Mexican cultural director

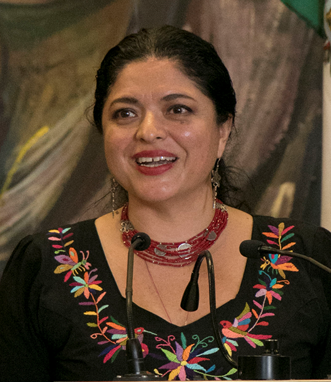

Secretary of Culture
- In office 1 December 2018 – 1 October 2024
- President: Andrés Manuel López Obrador
- Preceded by: María Cristina García Cepeda
- Succeeded by: Claudia Curiel de Icaza

Personal details
- Born: 25 March 1972 (age 54) Mexico City
- Education: National Autonomous University of Mexico (LLB)

Alejandra Frausto Guerrero (born 25 March 1972) is a Mexican lawyer and cultural director. From 1 December 2018 to 1 October 2024, she was the head of the Secretariat of Culture of Mexico appointed by President Andrés Manuel López Obrador.

== Biography ==
Frausto received a law degree from the National Autonomous University of Mexico. From 2004 to 2006, she served as cultural director of the University of the Cloister of Sor Juana. In 2018, she was announced as the head of Secretariat of Culture in the 2018 to 2024 administration and took office on 1 December of that year.
