= Rafael Tovar y de Teresa =

Mexican diplomat and cultural official

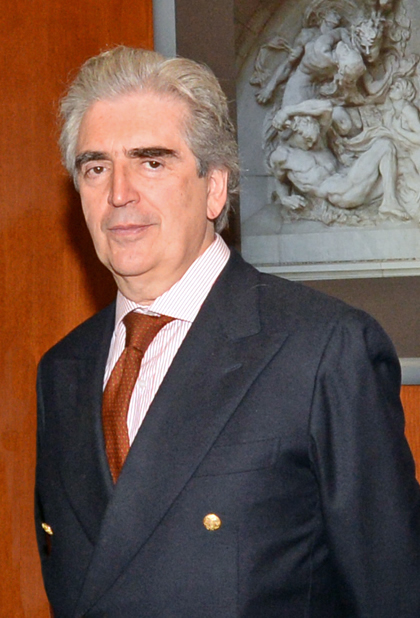
Rafael Tovar y de Teresa in 2015

Rafael Tovar y de Teresa (April 6, 1954 – December 10, 2016) was a Mexican diplomat, lawyer, scholar and historian. He was ambassador of Mexico to Italy between 2001 and 2007 and the second president of the National Council for Culture and the Arts (CONACULTA), a position he held on three separate occasions until the Council became the Secretariat of Culture in the cabinet of President Enrique Peña Nieto (2015). He was also president of the Organizing Committee for the Commemoration of the Bicentennial of the start of the National Independence movement and the Centenary of the start of the Mexican Revolution between September 2007 and October 2008.

== Biographical data ==
Rafael Tovar y de Teresa was born in Mexico City on April 6, 1954. He was the son of Rafael Tovar y Villa Gordoa and Isabel de Teresa y Wiechers. His brothers are Isabel, Lorenza, Gabriela, Guillermo, Fernando and Josefina.

He earned a law degree from the Metropolitan Autonomous University (UAM), generation 1974–1978, and he continued his studies at the Sorbonne University and at the School of Political Science in Paris.

He was a music critic with the cultural supplement of the Mexican newspaper Novedades from 1972 to 1973. He was head of Cultural Relations of the Secretariat of Finance (SHCP), from 1974 to 1976, and subsequently advisor to the director general of National Institute of Fine Arts, from 1976 to 1978.

In 1979 he joined the Mexican Foreign Service, where he was head of the General Directorate of Cultural Affairs of the Secretariat of Foreign Affairs from 1979 to 1982, then minister at the Mexican Embassy in France (1983 to 1987) and advisor to the Secretary of Foreign Affairs (1987 to 1988).

He served as Legal Affairs Coordinator of the newly founded National Council for Culture and the Arts, in 1989. Subsequently, from 1990 to 1991, he served as Coordinator of International Affairs of the same council, and then became general director of the National Institute of Fine Arts, from 1991 to 1992. He was the second president of the National Council for Culture and the Arts (Conaculta) from 1992 to 2000, and was then appointed ambassador of Mexico in Italy, from 2001 to 2007.

He was president, from 17 September 2007 to 25 October 2008, of the Organizing Committee of the Bicentennial Commemoration of the start of the National Independence movement and of Centenary of the start of the Mexican Revolution, after the resignation of Cuauhtémoc Cárdenas Solórzano and the internship of Sergio Vela.

He died in Mexico City on December 10, 2016.

== Works ==
He is the author of the book Modernización y política cultura ("Modernization and cultural policy", published by the Fondo de Cultura Económica, and participated in the collective work El patrimonio cultural de México ("The cultural heritage of Mexico"), two volumes.

He published the novels: Paraíso es tu memoria (Paradise is your memory) (Alfaguara, 2009); El último brindis de Don Porfirio (The last toast of Don Porfirio) (Punto de Lectura. Santillana, 2012); De la paz al olvido. Porfirio Díaz y el final de un mundo (From peace to oblivion. Porfirio Díaz and the end of a world) (Taurus, 2015).

== Management at the National Institute of Fine Arts ==
He was general director of INBA from 1991 to 1992. During this period, the National Auditorium reopened its doors after the remodeling promoted, in 1989, by the National Council for Culture and the Arts, by the National Institute of Fine Arts and by the Regency of the Federal District.

== Management in the National Council for Culture and the Arts (1992–2000) ==
As president of Conaculta, he defined and adopted strategic projects for cultural policy and the modernization of institutions. During his tenure, in 1993, the National System of Art Creators was formed to contribute to the promotion and recognition of creative activity in the arts, as a fundamental part of the national identity and as revaluation of those who have delivered their talent for the enrichment of the cultural legacy of Mexico.

In 1994, the National Center of the Arts as a space to generate and explore new models and approaches around education, research and artistic diffusion, and also to foster interdiscipline in art, promote new technologies in the arts and create spaces for academic and artistic cooperation between institutions of different systems and levels in Mexico and abroad.

Also in 1994, it was created, in the building known as The Citadel, the Image Center, for the exposition of photography. n audiovisual media, the Channel 22 of open television. In the cinema, the Foprocine (Fund for Quality Film Production in Spanish) and the Fidecine (Fund of Investment and Stimulus to Cinema in Spanish), for the production of short films and feature films, deserving of awards in many cases and participants in international festivals.

During this period, the program Ibermedia in 1999, to develop excellent cinematographic projects. Likewise, it was integrated into the cultural sector National Cineteca, to which resources were allocated to protect its collections and expand and renovate its facilities. To stimulate film culture, the Universal Video Library.

With the purpose of providing the country with a new national museum that concentrated the folk art, a trust was created for the development of the project to which, in collaboration with the Government of Mexico City, it was assigned a space in the Historic Center of Mexico City, currently the headquarters of Museo de Arte Popular.

In parallel to his responsibility as president of Conaculta, he was executive secretary of the Year 2000 Program Committee: "From the 20th Century to the Third Millennium", celebration of the arrival of this emblematic date that was the reason in Mexico for a vast number of projects and activities.

== Management in the National Council for Culture and the Arts (2012–2015) ==
Among his tasks was the creation of a Digital Agenda of Culture, to boost the development of applications on topics such as cinema, books, history, children and children music, among others.

== Creation of the Secretariat of Culture ==
On September 2, 2015, President Enrique Peña Nieto proposed, in his Third Government Report, the creation of the Secretariat of Culture. On September 7 he sent his creation initiative to legislators, which was approved by the Senate on 15 December. More than 100 years after the birth of the Secretariat of Public Instruction, in 1905, and after it became Secretariat of Public Education in 1921, in 2015 the first Secretariat of Culture was founded. On December 21, 2015, Rafael Tovar y Teresa was named the country's first Secretary of Culture.

== Death ==
After being hospitalized on December 8, Tovar y Teresa died early on December 10, 2016, at the age of 62 at the Military Hospital of Mexico City. His remains rest in the family crypt of the French Cemetery of San Joaquín in Mexico City next to his grandfather Guillermo de Teresa, his father Rafael Tovar Villa-Gordoa and his brother Guillermo Tovar de Teresa, who was a chronicler in Mexico City.

On December 12 President Enrique Peña Nieto led a national tribute in memory of Rafael Tovar y Teresa at the National Center of the Arts, in which his son, Rafael Tovar López-Portillo, delivered an emotional speech highlighting his father's legacy. Also, cellist Carlos Prieto highlighted the professional career of Tovar y Teresa. For his part, President Peña spoke of the human quality, professionalism and friendship he had with the deceased and placed him on the "altar of the greats" as José Vasconcelos and Jaime Torres Bodet.

== Family ==
His brother, Guillermo Tovar de Teresa, was a prominent art historian, bibliographer, art collector, chronicler, philanthropist and scholar.
