= Secretariat of Culture =

Mexican government agency

- Secretaría de Cultura

Agency overview
- Formed: 18 December 2015
- Preceding agency: National Council for Culture and Arts (CONACULTA)
- Jurisdiction: Government of Mexico
- Headquarters: Secretaría de Cultura offices, Paseo de la Reforma, Mexico City
- Ministers responsible: Claudia Curiel de Icaza, Secretary; Rafael Tovar y de Teresa, Inaugural holder
- Website: www.gob.mx/cultura

The Secretariat of Culture (Spanish: Secretaría de Cultura) — formerly known as the National Council for Culture and Arts (Spanish: Consejo Nacional para la Cultura y las Artes or CONACULTA) before being elevated to ministerial level in 2015 — is a Mexican government agency in charge of the nation's museums and monuments, promoting and protecting the arts (visual, plastic, theatrical, musical, dance, architectural, literary, televisual and cinematographic), and managing the national archives.

CONACULTA was created in 1988 as a decentralized body of the Secretariat of Public Education (Spanish: Secretaría de Educación Pública). On 18 December 2015, it was established as a separate secretariat following the passage of a law originally promoted three months earlier by President Enrique Peña Nieto.

Diplomat, historian and lawyer Rafael Tovar y de Teresa was the first culture secretary; he served for one year after CONACULTA's elevation to a Cabinet-level position in December 2015 until 10 December 2016, when he died in Mexico City at the age of 62. The current culture secretary, since 2024, is Claudia Curiel de Icaza.

== Subsidiaries ==
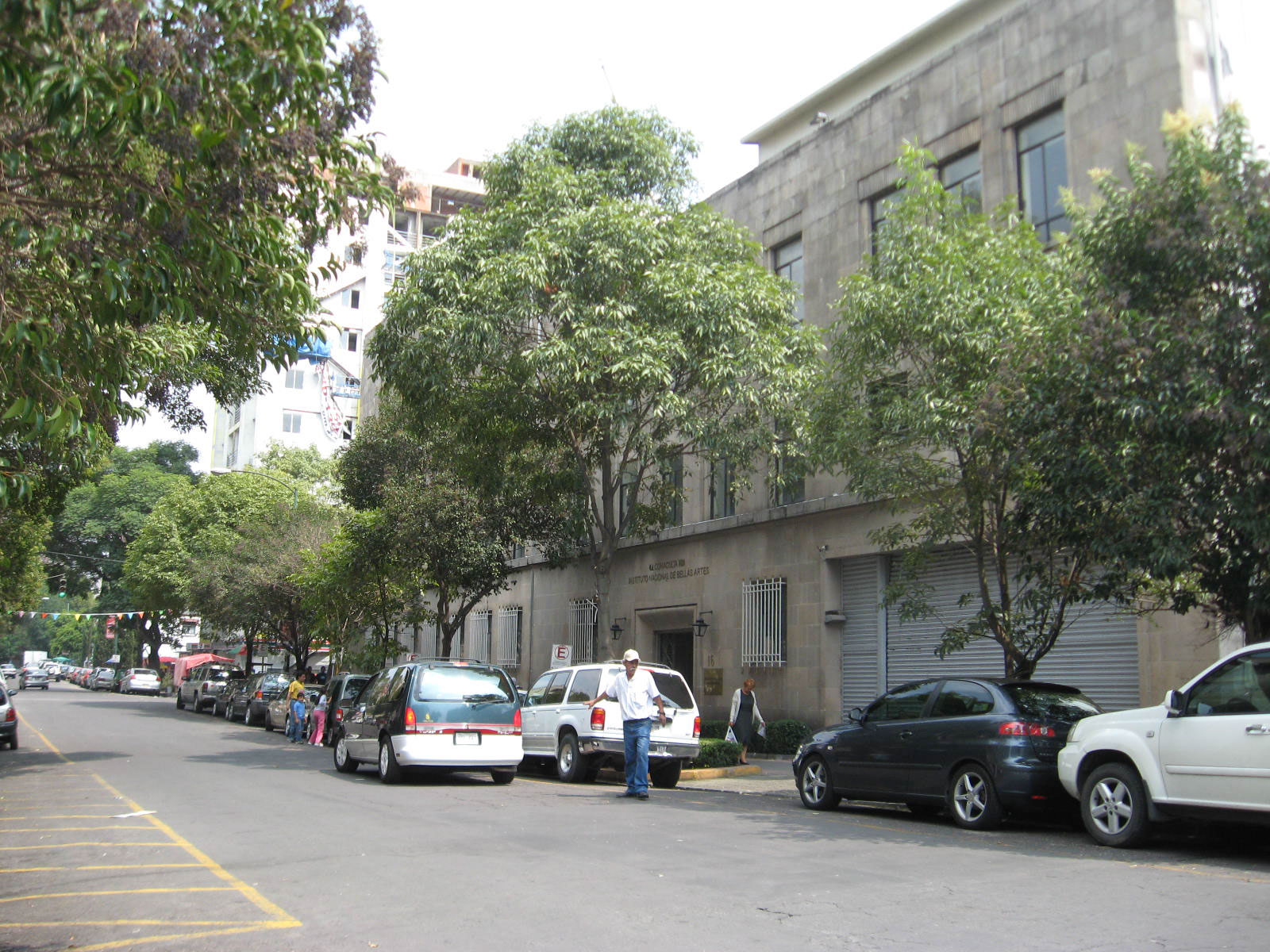
The Luis Spota Saavedra Art Education Center located on Londres Street in Colonia Juárez in Mexico City.

Subsidiaries of the Secretariat of Culture include the Vasconcelos Library, the National Fund for Culture and the Arts (FONCA), the Mexican Film Institute (IMCINE), the National Institute of Anthropology and History (INAH) and the National Institute of Fine Arts and Literature (INBA).

== Broadcasting ==
Upon its creation, the Secretariat of Culture took control of CONACULTA's television station Canal 22, seen on air in Mexico City and relayed by 25 SPR transmitters, as well as Radio Educación, which had previously been part of the SEP. Both stations transmit cultural and educational content.
