= Mindi (disambiguation) =

Mindi is a suburb in Andhra Pradesh, India. Mindi may also refer to:

- Mindi Abair (born 1969), American jazz saxophonist
- Mindi Jackson (born 1978?), lead singer of the Australian pop band Rogue Traders
- Mindi or Mirndi languages, spoken in Australia

== See also ==
- Emperor Min (disambiguation), the posthumous name for several imperial Chinese emperors
- Mindy (disambiguation)
- Minde (disambiguation)
