= Rail transport in Belize =

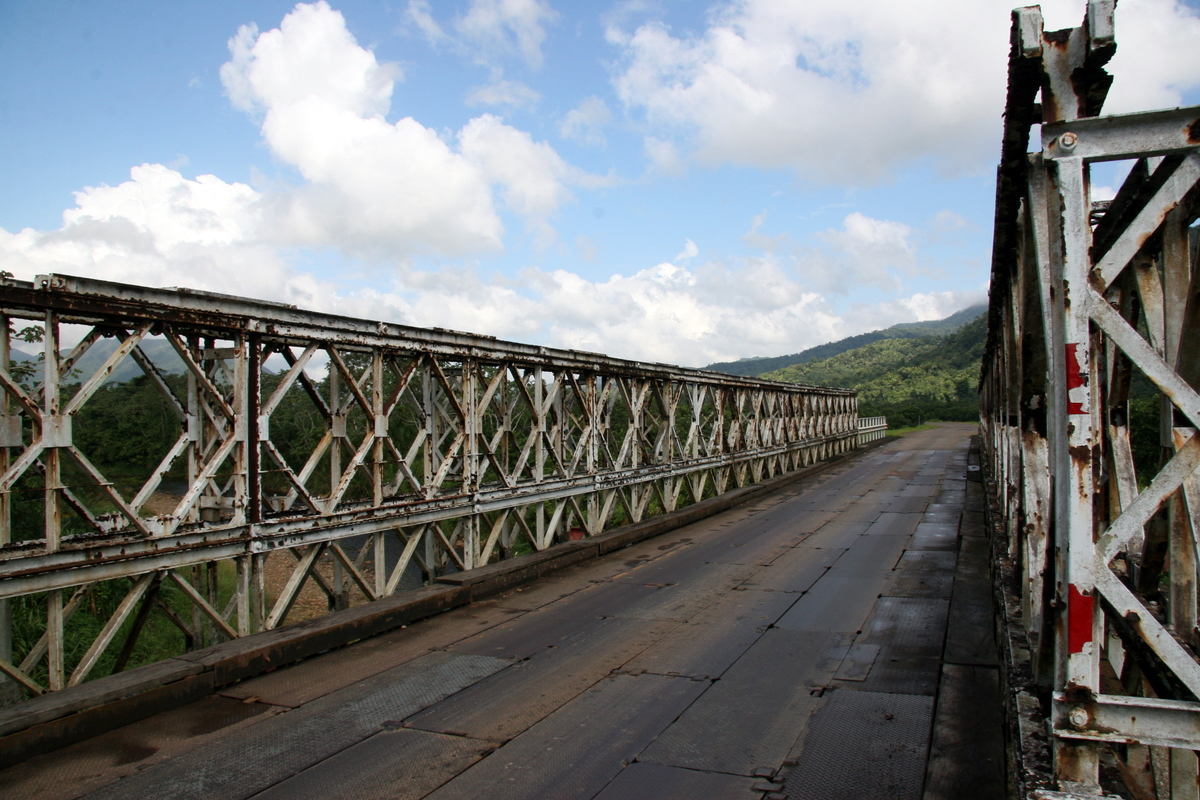
Old railway bridge along the Hummingbird Highway

There is no active rail transport in Belize, although there were lines in the past.

== Overview ==
An 1888 map (British Honduras, Usher, 1888) identifies a number of proposed routes for a Belize (city) to Guatemala Railway.

A 1920s map, Railroad Map of British Honduras identifies five railways / tramways:

1. Belize Estate & Produce Co Ltd (Gallon Jug Railway), located in Belize District, north west of Belize City, off Black Creek.
2. Victoria Falls Lumber Co, located in Belize District, north west of Belize City, off Old River.
3. British Honduras Syndicate Tramway, located in Stann Creek District, Stann Creek to Melinda.
4. Stann Creek Railway, located in Stann Creek District, Stann Creek to Middlesex.
5. Tramway - Swasey Branch with Sennis River, located in Toledo District.

The 1920s map shows a single proposed line from Belize to Guatemala, the Belize to Peten Railroad.

A Brief History of Pomona and the North Stann Creek Valley, taking information from the David Rollinson book, states the number of former railways in Belize as (at least) eight:

1. Stann Creek Railway.
2. Vaca Falls Railway (between Vaca Falls and Chiquibul Forest).
3. Gallon Jug Railway.
4. One near Punta Gorda.
5. One at Monkey River.
6. Two (at least) in northern Belize.
7. A short line at Mango Creek.

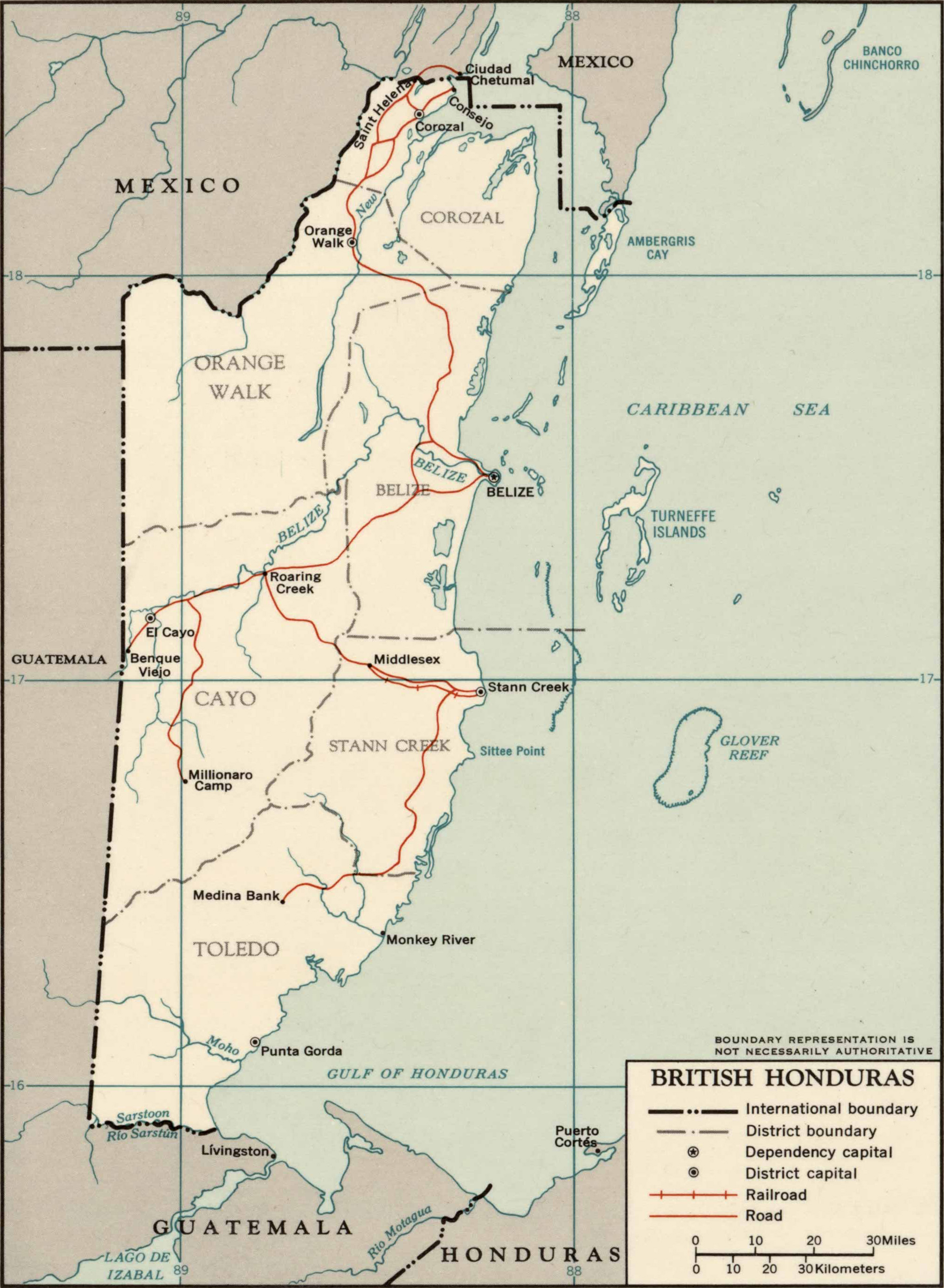
Map of British Honduras, 1965, showing Stann Creek Railway

A 1965 map (see right) shows the route of the Stann Creek Railway.

Historically, one of the major railways in Belize was the Stann Creek Railway used by United Fruit, which connected Middlesex Estate with the port of Dangriga. The railway was 3 ft (914 mm) narrow gauge, and operated from 1913 till 1937, when it was abandoned. Many remains are still visible along the Hummingbird Highway (between Dangriga and Belmopan). This road uses some of the old railway bridges, though they are gradually disappearing as bridges are modernized.

Belize Estate & Produce Co Ltd railway ran from Hill Bank, at the south end of a lagoon on the New River, west through Sierra de Agua to Gallon Jug, an abandoned community about 10 km from the Guatemala border.

There have been no railway connections to other countries.

== Future projects ==
In 2025, the Mexican government proposed extending the Tren Maya into Belize, starting with a 7 km branch crossing the Hondo River into Belizean territory. The line could later continue towards the Guatemalan border. The project is envisaged as an international rail connection for both freight and passenger services, aiming to strengthen regional trade and infrastructure integration between Mexico, Belize, and Guatemala. Feasibility studies and timelines for implementation remain under discussion.

== See also ==
- Belize
- Transport in Belize
