= Mindy =

Mindy is a feminine given name. No notable studies have been done documenting records or history of the name, and professionals are unsure of its exact origins. The most popular theory is that Mindy is a diminutive of the Latin Melinda, but there is also speculation supporting a Greek origin meaning "gentle" or "honey". The name can also be translated to "bitter" in Hebrew, but this is generally considered an unlikely origin.

Notable people with the name include:

== People ==
- Mindy Aloff, American editor, journalist, essayist, and dance critic
- Mindy Baha El Din (1958–2013), American-born Egyptian ornithologist, eco-activist, and environmentalist
- Mindy Budgor, American businesswoman and writer
- Mindy Carson (1927–2025), American traditional pop vocalist
- Mindy Cohn (born 1966), American actress known for her role on the television show The Facts of Life
- Mindy Cook (born 1988), American goalball player
- Mindy Duncan (born c. 1971), winner of the 1988 Miss Teen USA pageant
- Mindy Finn, American political and technology consultant, entrepreneur, and former vice-presidential candidate.
- Mindy Gehrs, All-American swimmer
- Mindy Gledhill, singer-songwriter from Eureka, California
- Mindy Greiling (born 1948), American politician, member of the Minnesota House of Representatives
- Mindy Grossman, American chief executive officer of the Home Shopping Network
- Mindy Hall, American makeup artist
- Mindy Jacobsen, American, first blind woman to be ordained as a hazzan (also called a cantor) in the history of Judaism
- Mindy Kaling (born 1979), American actress and comedian, producer of the television show The Office and star of TV show The Mindy Project
- Mindy Kleinberg, American activist and member of the Jersey Girls
- Mindy L. Klasky, American fantasy novelist
- Mindy Marin, American casting director, producer, and writer
- Mindy McCready (1975–2013), American country music singer
- Mindy Newell (born 1953), American comic book author
- Mindy Robinson, American actress, model, and reality star
- Mindy Rosenfeld, American flutist, piper, and harpist
- Mindy Smith (born 1972), American singer and songwriter
- Mindy Sterling (born 1953), American actress best known for playing Frau Farbissina in the Austin Powers movies
- Mindy White, American musician

== Fictional characters ==
=== Television ===
==== Animation ====
- Mindy, half of the duo of Buttons and Mindy from the animated television series Animaniacs
- Mindy, from the animated television series The Grim Adventures of Billy & Mandy
- Mindy, a mermaid from The SpongeBob SquarePants Movie and SpongeBob's Big Birthday Blowout
- Mindy, a member of Caramella Girls
- Mindy Simmons, a character who Homer Simpson had an affair with on the animated sitcom The Simpsons

==== Live-action ====
- Mindy St. Claire, the sole resident of The Medium Place in the television series The Good Place
- Mindy Crenshaw, Josh Nichols's archnemesis and eventual girlfriend in the television series Drake & Josh
- Mindy Gladstone, Joey Gladstone's mom in the television series Full House
- Mindy Wallace, a publicist who appeared in Zack Morris' dream in the television series Saved By The Bell
- Mindy Kuhel Lahiri, main character from the television series The Mindy Project
- Mindy McConnell, one of the title characters from the television series Mork & Mindy, portrayed by Pam Dawber
- Mindy Minus, the antagonist from the television series 100 Things to Do Before High School
- Mindy O'Dell, from the television series Veronica Mars

=== Other ===
- Mindy Park, from The Martian novel by Andy Weir
- Kid Mindy, from the Midnighter comic book series
- Mindy, from the video games Pokémon Diamond and Pearl and Pokémon Platinum
- Mindy McCready (Hit-Girl), from the Millarworld Hit-Girl & Kick-Ass franchise

== See also ==
- Tropical Storm Mindy, various storms named Mindy
- Mindi (disambiguation)
- Minde (disambiguation)
