= Minda =

Minda may refer to:

- Minzu University of China, Beijing, People's Republic of China; in Chinese as 民大 (Míndà)
- A character in Filipino soap opera Bituing Walang Ningning
- A detention facility in Lidcombe, New South Wales
- A neighbourhood in Reșița, Romania
- An uncommon short form of the female given name Melinda
- Minda Inc, an organisation that runs a facility in Adelaide, South Australia, for children and adults with intellectual disabilities
- Minda (village), a village in India
- Mindanao Development Authority (MinDA)

== See also ==
- Midna, a Legend of Zelda character
