= Rail transport in Central America =

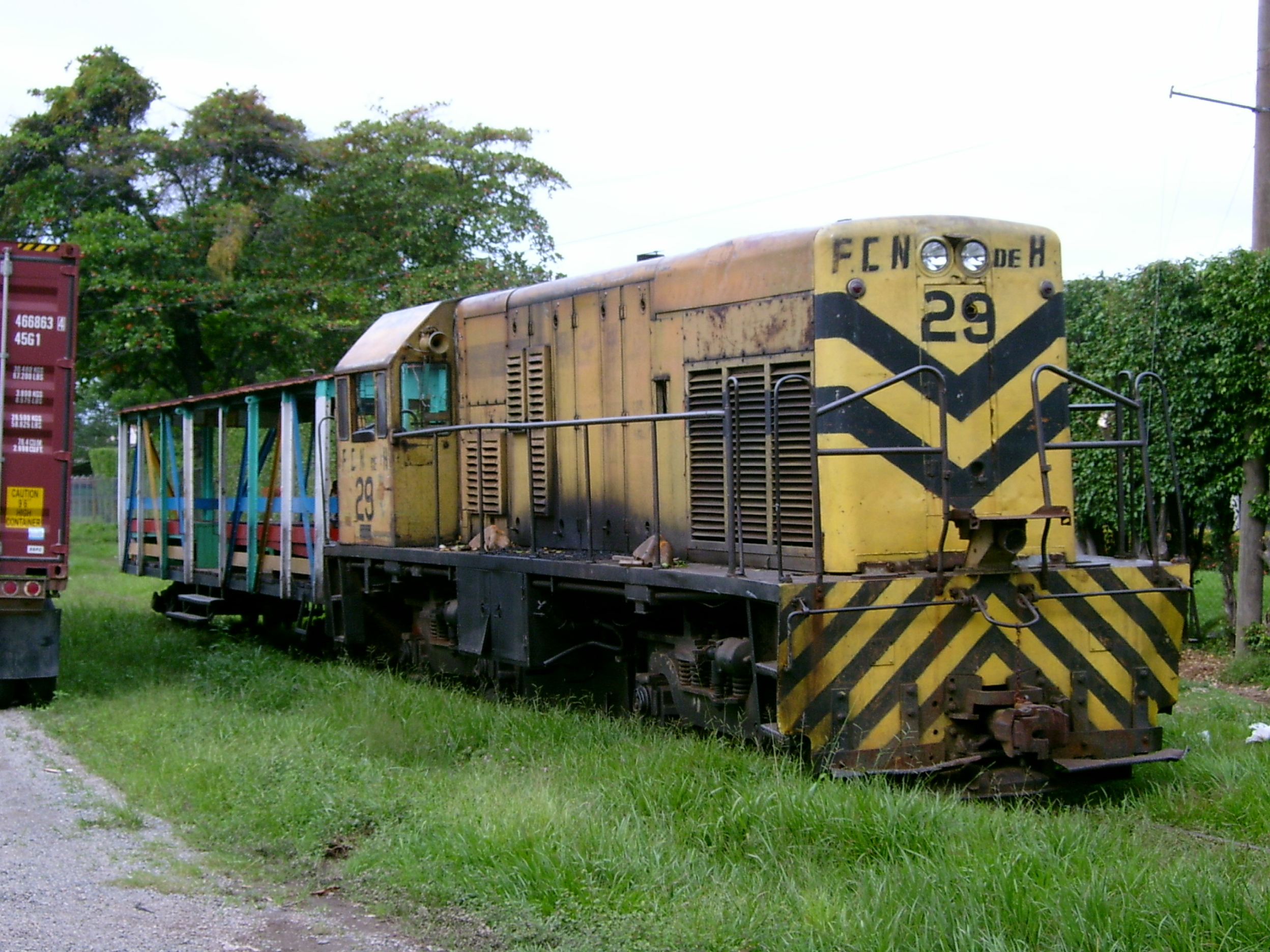
City rail in La Ceiba, Honduras is one of the few remaining passenger train services in Central America.

Rail transport in Central America consists of several isolated railroad lines with freight or passenger service. The most famous one is the Panama Canal Railway, the oldest transcontinental railroad in the world, connecting Panama City with Colón since 1855. Other railroads in Belize, Guatemala, Honduras, El Salvador, Nicaragua, Costa Rica, and Panama were built by private and public investors mainly to facilitate the transport of local agricultural produce (bananas, coconuts, coffee) to export markets and harbors. Their market share and profitability went into decline in the second half of the twentieth century and most lines have been decommissioned by the end of the 1990s. As of 2018, railroads operate locally in Honduras, Costa Rica, and Panama only; all rail transport has been suspended in Belize, El Salvador, Guatemala, and Nicaragua. The railways still operating do not cross national borders.

== Belize ==
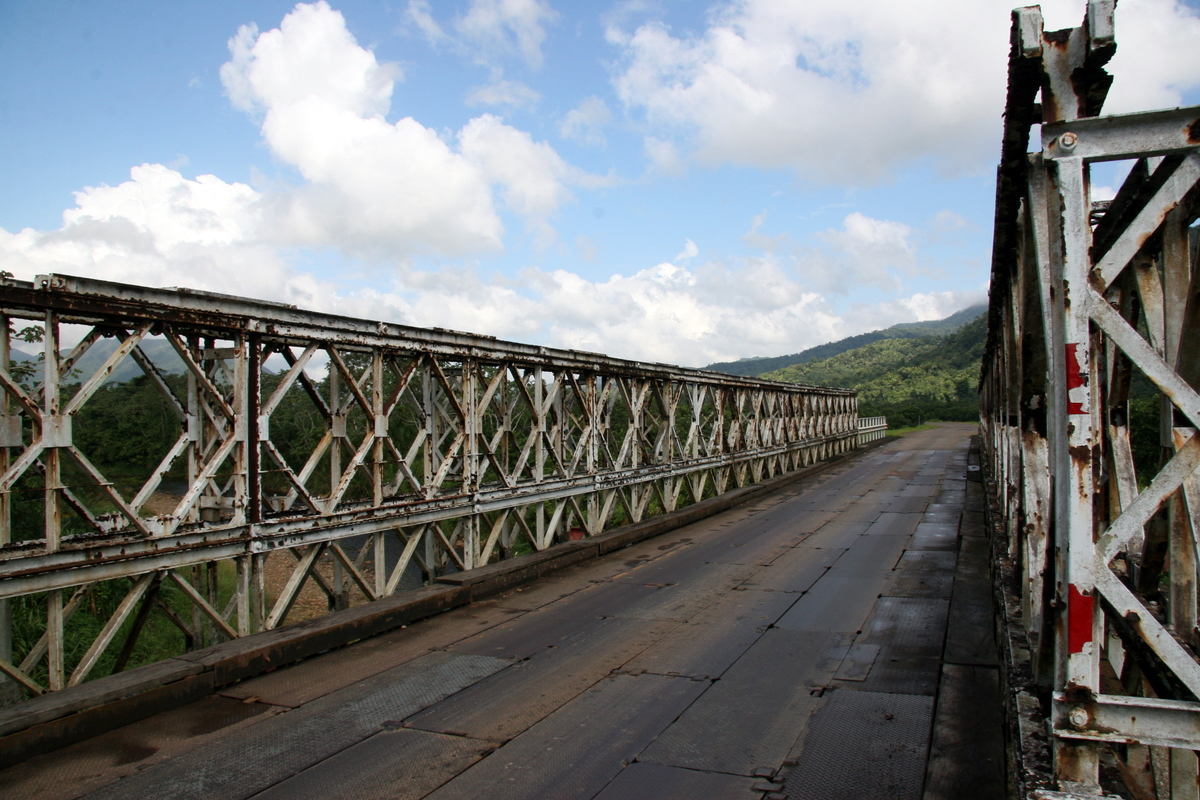
Old railroad bridge along the Hummingbird Highway.

There are no operational railroads in Belize. Historically, the major line - Stann Creek Railway built by the British Honduras Syndicate and later used by the United Fruit - connected Middlesex Estate with Dangriga port along present-day Hummingbird Highway between 1913 and 1937.

== Costa Rica ==
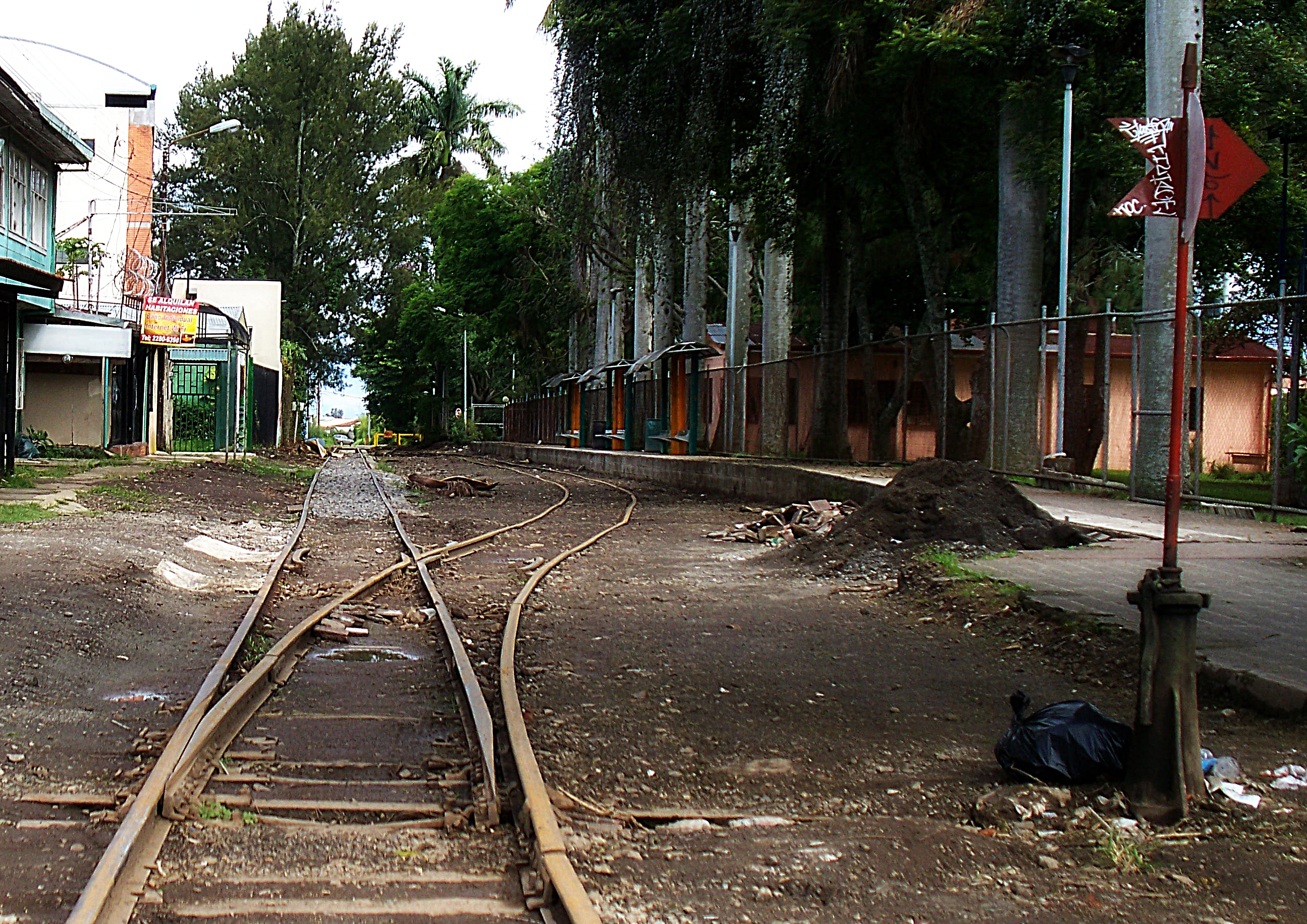
Train Station (INCOFER) in Costa Rica, near the University of Costa Rica

Railroads in Costa Rica are managed by state owned Instituto Costarricense de Ferrocarriles, Incofer, and are of 1,067 mm (3 ft 6 in) narrow gauge, the same as Honduras and Nicaragua.

Incofer runs the Interurbano Line around San José and freight trains in the Caribbean for ArcelorMittal operations.

The first railroad in Costa Rica was opened in 1873, running between San José and Alajuela. In 1890, it reached the Atlantic coast in Puerto Limón. The contractor constructing the railroad from San Jose to Limon was Minor Cooper Keith. A concession of land granted to Keith to help compensate him and investors became a component of United Fruit. Construction of a Pacific railroad started in 1897 with the first train reaching Puntarenas in 1910. In 1926, a decision was made to electrify the lines; the first electric train reached Puntarenas in 1930.

The railroad network was damaged during an earthquake in 1991 and operations suspended in 1995. In 2005 Incofer started the Interurbano Line by reconditioning the abandoned lines in the Greater Metropolitan Area.

== El Salvador ==
Short-lived shuttle train in San Salvador, 2005

All rail transport in El Salvador was suspended between October 2002 and 2007, with the exception of a short-lived shuttle passenger train between San Salvador and Soyapango during emergency repairs on a road bridge in 2004 - 2005.

In 2007 a suburban passenger service operated by FENADESAL between San Salvador, Ciudad Delgado, and Apopa has been put in service, it runs Monday to Friday a round-trip on early morning and another round-trip during evening peak. Its low fare of $0,10 makes it very popular. During 2008 this train transported 224,727 passengers. However service was again suspended in 2013.

Railroads have been built in El Salvador since 1882 by The Salvador Rail Company Limited (later named FES - Ferrocarril de El Salvador) and United Fruit (IRCA). In 1975, the two companies merged into FENADESAL - Ferrocarriles Nacionales de El Salvador. At present, this agency oversees 554.8 km of disused tracks, connecting major cities and formerly linked to Guatemala railroads at Anguiatú. The railroads in El Salvador were of narrow gauge, 914 mm (3 ft), the same as Guatemala. The line from Texis Junction to Santa Ana and Ahuachapán has been dismantled and the soil of it given away to people who lost their houses during an earthquake, today it is probably the longest and narrowest slum.

Official homepage: https://web.archive.org/web/20100306182740/http://www.fenadesal.gob.sv/

== Guatemala ==
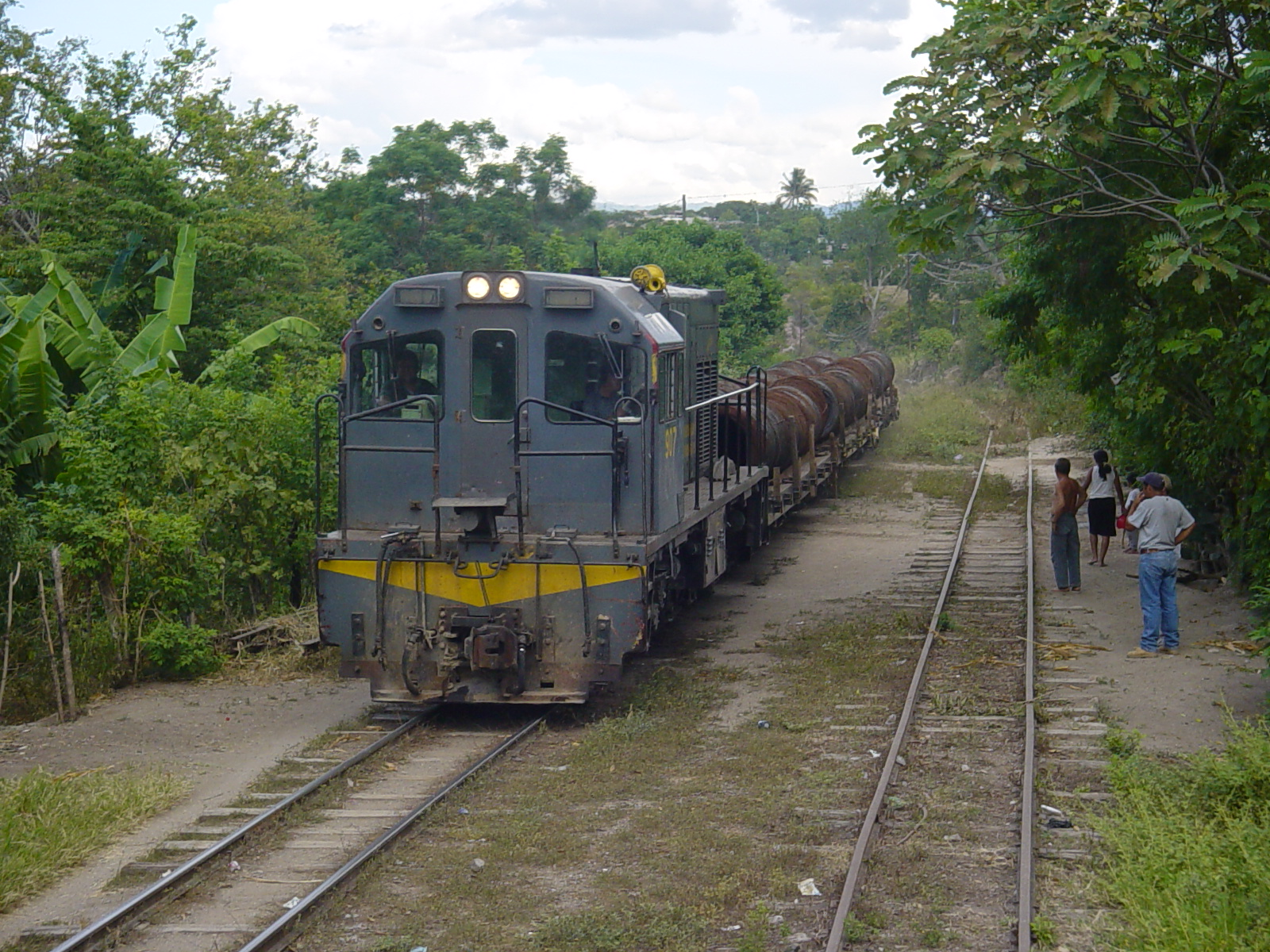
Freight transport was the main business of Ferrovías Guatemala.

Guatemala had 320 km (200 mi) of operating 914 mm narrow gauge railroads between Guatemala City and Puerto Barrios, managed by US-based Railroad Development Corporation as Ferrovías Guatemala. They ran regular freight trains and occasional charter steam trains for tourists from 1999 until September 2007, when all operation was suspended following a conflict with the Government of Guatemala. (June 2011) Most of the rail and steel bridges have now been dismantled by thieves meaning there now no possibility that service can be reinstated without millions of dollars' worth of investment in rebuilding it.

Railroads have been built in Guatemala since 1884. In 1912, the network was acquired by United Fruit Company, named IRCA and developed to connect Guatemala City with the Pacific coast (Puerto San José), Atlantic coast (Puerto Barrios), El Salvador (Anguiatú), Mexico (Ciudad Tecún Umán - change of gauges (restored) 1,435 mm or 4 ft 8 1/2 in / 914 mm or 3 ft) and other places. In the 1950s, the railroads went into a decline, resulting in nationalization (1968, new name was FEGUA - Ferrocarriles de Guatemala) and suspension of all services in 1996. In 1997, the government gave a fifty-year concession to the Railroad Development Corporation, which then resumed operations on one line in 1999 and abandoned operation on September 30, 2007.

Apart from this main network, there were two other local railroads - Ferrocarril de Los Altos from Quetzaltenango to Retalhuleu and Ferrocarril Verapaz to the North-West of Lago de Izabal. They were closed in 1933 and 1963, respectively. A light rail system for Guatemala City is in the planning stages.

== Honduras ==
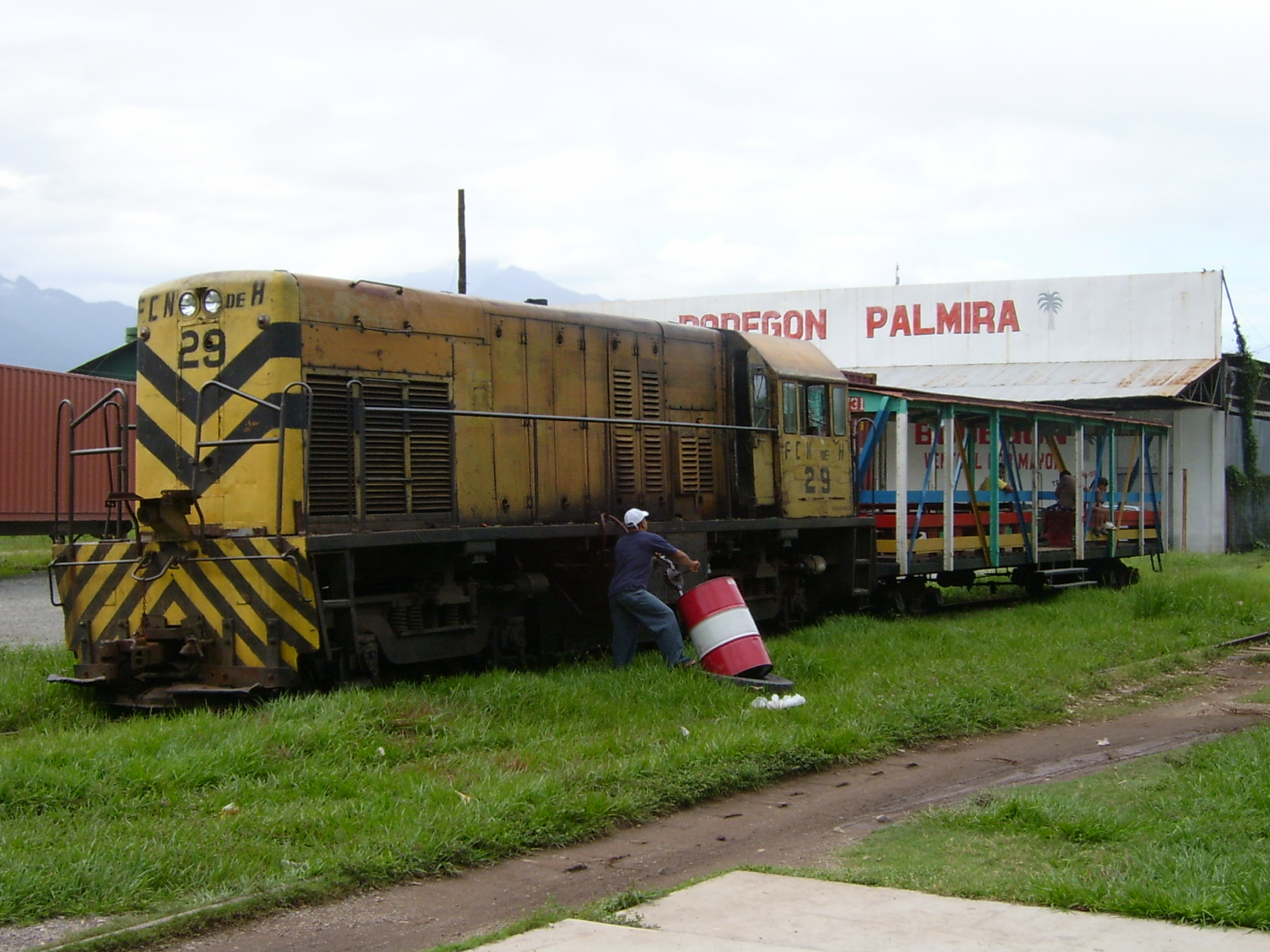
Passenger train in La Ceiba on January 11, 2005. Engineer tanks fuel manually from a barrel. Colorful passenger car (former box car without walls) is attached to the right.

Railroads in Honduras have been built in the northern lowlands (Valle de Sula) since the 1880s by two competing banana growers - United Fruit and Standard Fruit. They never extended to the capital (Tegucigalpa) or to the Pacific coast and never linked to other countries. In 1993, the combined network had 785 km (488 mi). All railroads in Honduras are 1,067 mm (3 ft 6 in). In 2006, three separate segments operated under the management of FNH - Ferrocarril Nacional de Honduras:

- San Pedro Sula - Puerto Cortes (50 km (31 mi), freight trains carrying mainly lumber) and occasional passenger trains around San Pedro Sula, for example during carneval and other holidays.
- City rail in La Ceiba (3 km (1.9 mi), passenger transport between downtown and a western suburb, Col. Sitramacsa)
- Line between La Unión (a village near La Ceiba) and Parque Nacional Cuero y Salado (9 km (5.6 mi), transport of coconuts to a processing plant and of tourists to national park)

== Nicaragua ==
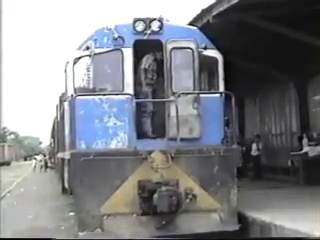
Diesel Locomotive General Electric in the old Nicaragua's railway

There are no operating railroads in Nicaragua. The majority of lines were closed in 1993, the last one in 2001.

Narrow gauge railroads in Nicaragua have been built since 1878 on the Pacific coast. First was a Western division (from Corinto to Puerto Momotombo at Lake Managua, passengers to Managua had to change to a steamboat), then the Eastern division from Managua to Granada and finally a Central division connecting these two (thus eliminating the need for steamboats). In the following years, several branch lines were built. There were attempts to connect both coasts, but they all failed; except for a few isolated lines in the North, almost all of the network was in the Pacific basin. In 1993, there were 373 km (232 mi) of 1,067 mm (3 ft 6 in) narrow gauge tracks in the Pacific region and isolated 3 km (1.9 mi) of 1,435 mm (4 ft 8 1/2 in) standard gauge line at Puerto Cabezas in the Caribbean. Most lines were shut down on December 31, 1993. The last one - 6 km (3.7 mi) from Chichigalpa to Ing. S. Antonio - was decommissioned in September 2001.

== Panama ==
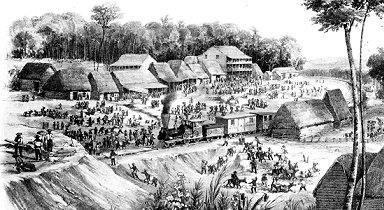
Panama railway in 1854

The only operating railroad in Panama is Panama Railway - the oldest intercontinental railway in the world, connecting Panama City and Colón with passenger and freight trains since 1855. It provided a vital transport link between the eastern United States and California during the mid 19th century and was used for the construction of the Panama Canal. In 1979 the US transferred control of the railroad to Panama; in 1998 it was privatized and since 2000, it runs on 1,435 mm (4 ft 8 1/2 in) standard gauge. Prior to that it ran on 5 ft (1,524 mm) broad gauge.

At the end of the nineteenth century, the government of Colombia studied the feasibility of additional railroads. Panama Railway was commissioned to estimate the cost of a railroad from Panama City to David, Chiriquí. The cost was however too high and a decision was made to build additional network in Chiriquí Province only. This railroad (Ferrocarril de Chiriquí) was inaugurated on April 23, 1916 with the first train on a steep mountain line from David to Boquete. Additional lines were built subsequently. After 1974 the infrastructure of Chiriquí Railroads has been transferred to Ministry of Public Works (Ministerio de Obras Públicas) and operations were stopped line by line. The last regular passenger service operated twice daily with a railcar between Ciudad David and Puerto Armuelles in about 1984. In the beginning of the 21st century, the tracks of the defunct railroads are being dismantled and reused for construction of bridges in rural areas.

Two separate and distinct tram or streetcar systems operated in Panama City. The first started service on October 1, 1893 and ended during the Thousand Days' War. The second started in 1913 and operated, with reorganizations and company transferrals, until May 31, 1941.

The Chiriqui Land Co. operated 2 railways systems, one in Puerto Armuelles (Pacific) and in Changuinola to Almirante Port (Caribbean), used to transport bananas and company equipment. The Puerto Armuelles side was shut down when Chiquita decided return land to the Panamanian government, around 2008 the Changuinola side closed operations and sold railways and diesel-electric engines to a Brazilian company, some of this equipment is now in use in Eastern Africa.

The railway system was impressive, covered from Sixaola to Almirante, including all Changuinola banana farms. In 2010, contracts were awarded for line 1 of a metro system for Panama City.

== International ==
An intercontinental railway was proposed in 1912 to connect North and South America.

The FERISTSA railway was proposed by The Shaw Group in 2010 to connect Mexico with Panama via ports along the way, the group in charge doesn't exist anymore and the plan was discarded.
