= Mel (given name) =

Mel is a given name. It is often short for Melech, Melike, Melvyn, Melvin, Amelia, Melfyn, Melanie, Melania, Melika, Melhem, Melina, Melinda, Melody, Melissa, Melita, Melitta, Melantha, Melanthe, Melvina, Melchior, Melindro, or Melville. It is also a standalone name from the Gaelic Maol, meaning bald.

== People ==
People with this name include:

- Mel Allen (1913–1996), American sportscaster
- Mel B (born 1975), English singer, former member of the Spice Girls
- Mel Baggs (1980–2020), American blogger
- Mel Blanc (1908–1989), American voice actor
- Mel Bleeker (1920–1996), American National Football League player
- Mel Brooks (born 1926), American comedy filmmaker, writer and actor
- Mel C (born 1974), English singer, former member of the Spice Girls
- Mel Carter (born 1939), American soul and pop singer
- Mel Ferrer (1917–2008), American actor, director and producer
- Mel Gibson (born 1956), American film actor and director
- Mel Giedroyc (born 1968), British TV presenter and comedian
- Mel Gray (disambiguation), several people
- Mel Hall (born 1960), American baseball player
- Mel Harris (born 1956), American actress
- Mel Jones (born 1972), Australian cricketer
- Mel Kaye, subject of The Story of Mel, about the archetypal "real programmer"
- Mel Knight (born 1944), Canadian politician
- Mel Lastman (1933–2021), Canadian businessman and politician
- Mel Leipzig (1935–2025), American painter and educator
- Mel Lisboa (born 1982), Brazilian actress
- Mel Martin (born 1947), British actress
- Mel McDaniel (1942–2011), American country music singer-songwriter
- Mel Ott (1909–1958), American baseball player
- Mel Peachey (born 1980), British television host
- Mel Rosen (1928–2018), American track coach
- Mel Smith (1952–2013), British actor, writer and director
- Mel Street (1933–1978), American country music singer
- Mel Stuessy (1901–1980), American football player
- Mel Tiangco (born 1955), Filipino journalist, host, news caster
- Mel Tillis (1932–2017), American country music singer-songwriter
- Mel Tormé (1925–1999), American jazz singer, composer, arranger, and drummer
- Mel Whinnen (born 1942), former Australian rules footballer
- Mel White (born 1940), American clergyman and author
- Mel Winkler (1941–2020), American actor
- Mel Robbins (born 1968), American podcast host, author, and motivational speaker

== Fictional characters ==
- Mel Burton, a character on the soap opera Hollyoaks
- Mel Bush, the companion character for the Sixth and Seventh Doctor in the Doctor Who television series
- Mel Karnofsky, a character from the television sitcom Frasier
- Mel Owen, a character on the soap opera EastEnders
- Mel Sharples, owner and cook of Mel's Diner on the American sitcom Alice
- Mel, a Welsh terrier in the direct-to-video animated film Balto III: Wings of Change
- Mel Vera, one of the main characters of the 2018 television series Charmed
- Sideshow Mel, a character on the cartoon show The Simpsons
- Mel, the title character of the video game Portal Stories: Mel
- Mel, a pug in the animated film The Secret Life of Pets
- Cousin Mel, the antagonist of Grandma Got Run Over by a Reindeer
- "Mel" Melathia, a character in the Filipino Webtoon series Mage & Demon Queen
- Mel, a character in the video game The Last of Us Part II
- Mel, leader of the Minions since Despicable Me 3
- Mel, a character on the TV series Jack's Big Music Show
- Mel, (real name Melancholy Hill) a main protagonist from an animated web series The Gaslight District

== See also ==
- Mell, Japanese singer
