= Melinde =

Melinde may refer to:

- Melinda, a female name
- Malindi (once known as Melinde), a town on the coast of Kenya
