= Hummingbird Highway =

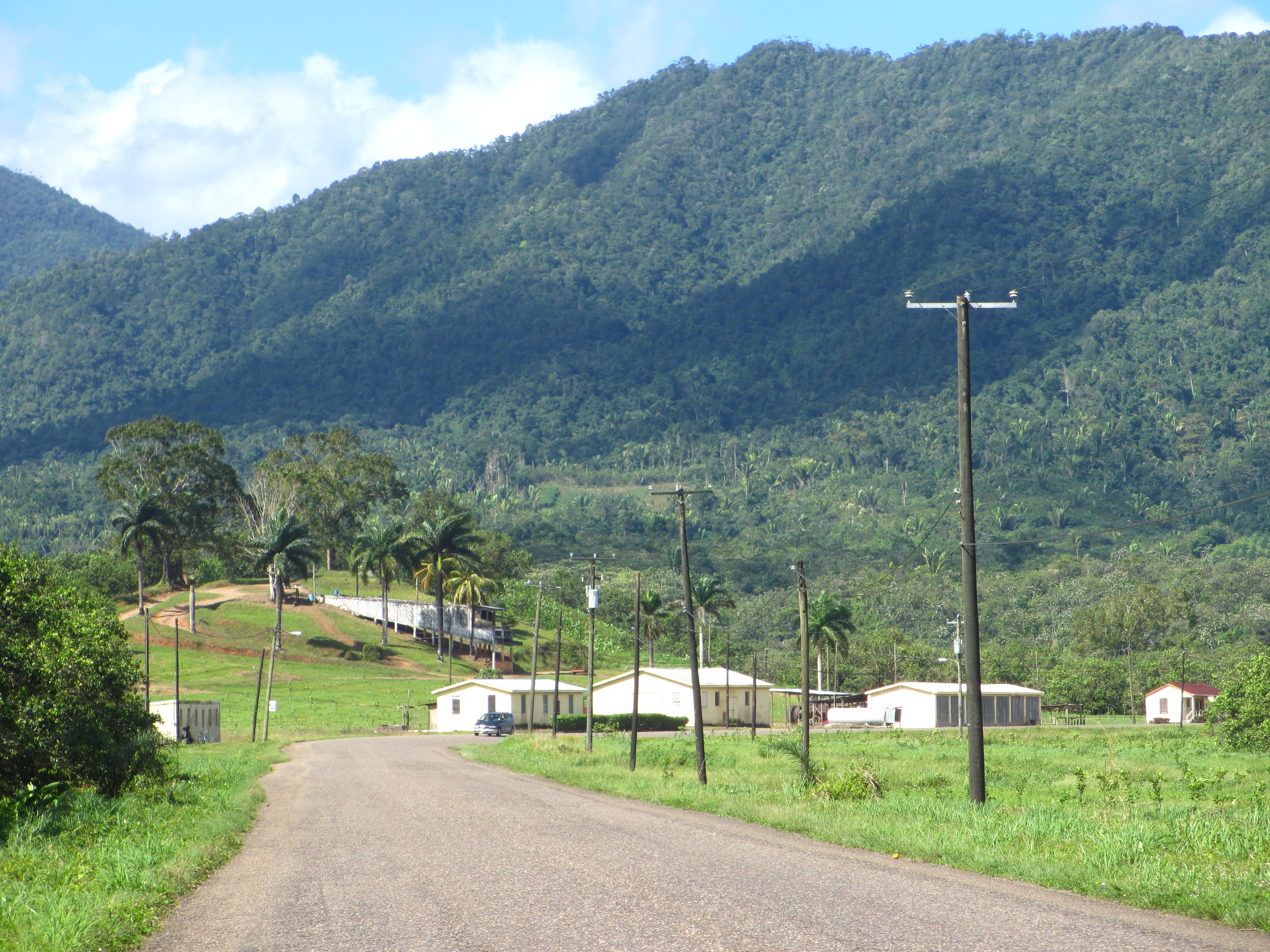
- The Maya Mountains along the Hummingbird Highway

Route information
- Length: 53.7 mi (86.4 km)

Major junctions
- From: Belmopan, Cayo District
- To: Dangriga, Stann Creek District

Location
- Country: Belize

Highway system
- Roads in Belize

The Hummingbird Highway is one of the four major highways in Belize.

It connects the George Price Highway outside of Belmopan, Cayo District to the Southern Highway outside of Dangriga, Stann Creek District. It partially follows, and sometimes uses the infrastructure of, the former Stann Creek Railway (see Rail transport in Belize).

== See also ==
- Hummingbird heist – notorious 1998 armed robbery on this highway
