= Minde =

Minde may refer to:

== Places ==
- Minde (Alcanena), a freguesia or civil parish in Portugal
- Minde, Bergen, a neighborhood in Bergen, Norway

== People ==
- Cheng Minde or M. T. Cheng (1917–1998), Chinese mathematician
- Espen Minde (born 1983), Norwegian footballer
- Kristine Minde (born 1992), Norwegian footballer
- Kristin Minde (born 1982), Norwegian pop singer and musician
- Kåre Minde (1930/31–2003), Norwegian politician
- Wang Minde (born 1965), Chinese-American actor

== Other ==
- Minde, the Swahili word for the Abbott's duiker, an antelope found in Tanzania
- the title character of Grete Minde, a 1977 Austrian-German drama film

== See also ==
- Mindy (disambiguation)
