= Melinda =

- Gender: Female

Origin
- Origin: Albanian, Greek, Latin

Other names
- Related names: Melanie, Melissa, Melina, Mel, Linda, Mindy

Melinda is a feminine given name.

== Etymology ==
The modern name Melinda is a combination of "Mel" with the suffix "-inda". "Mel" can be derived from names such as Melanie meaning "dark, black" in Greek, or from Melina meaning "sweet like honey" or from Melissa (μέλισσα) meaning "honeybee" in Greek. It is also associated with the Greek word meli, meaning "honey", and with Linda, from "lind" meaning "gentle, soft, tender" in the Germanic languages.

== Pronunciation ==
The typical English pronunciation of Melinda is /məˈlɪndə/. In Hungarian, the stress is on the first syllable: [ˈmɛlindɒ].

== Notable people ==
=== Academics ===
- Malinda Carpenter, Fellow of the Royal Society of Edinburgh, child development psychology researcher
- Melinda H. Keefe, American art restorer
- Melinda Mills, British sociologist
- Melinda Takeuchi, American art historian
- Melinda Tan, Singaporean linguist
- Melinda Wortz, American art historian

=== Actresses ===
- Melinda Clarke, American actress
- Melinda "Mindy" Cohn, American actress
- Melinda Culea, American actress
- Melinda Dillon, American actress
- Melinda O. Fee, American actress
- Melinda Kinnaman, Swedish actress
- Melinda Marx, American actress and daughter of Groucho Marx
- Melinda McGraw, American actress
- Melinda Messenger, English model and TV presenter
- Melinda Mullins, American actress
- Melinda Page Hamilton, American actress
- Melinda Shankar, Canadian actress
- Melinda Sullivan, American dancer and actress
- Melinda Sward, American actress
- Malinda Williams, American actress

=== Artists ===
- Melinda Bordelon, American painter
- Melinda Doring, Australian costume designer
- Melinda Rackham, Australian artist

=== Entertainers ===
- Melinda Bam South African model and beauty pageant titleholder
- Melinda Ledbetter, wife and manager of Brian Wilson
- Malinda Kathleen Reese, American YouTube personality, actress and singer (Note: Reese also performs under the name "MALINDA".)
- Melinda Saxe, American magician

=== Lawyers ===
- Melinda Haag, former US attorney
- Melinda Harmon, US judge
- Melinda Taylor, Australian ICC lawyer

=== Musicians ===
- Melinda Ademi, Albanian singer
- Melinda Caroll, American singer
- Melinda Doolittle, American singer and American Idol contestant
- Melinda Kistétényi, Hungarian organist
- Melinda Maxwell, English oboist and composer
- Melinda O'Neal, American conductor
- Malinda Jackson Parker, Liberian singer and politician
- Melinda Schneider, Australian country singer
- Melinda Watts, American singer and musician

=== Philanthropists ===
- Melinda Gates, philanthropist and ex-wife of Bill Gates

=== Politicians ===
- Malinda Brumfield White (born 1967), American politician
- Melinda Bush, Illinois senator
- Melinda Katz, New York politician
- Melinda MacLean, Canadian politician
- Melinda Pavey, Australian politician
- Melinda Schwegmann, Louisiana state representative and lieutenant-governor
- Melinda Smyser, Idaho senator
- Melinda Széky-Sztrémi, Hungarian politician

=== Reporters ===
- Melinda Murphy, American reporter

=== Scientists ===
- Melinda Estes, American neuropathologist

=== Sportswomen ===
- Melinda Cooper, American boxer
- Melinda Copp, Canadian swimmer
- Melinda Czink, Hungarian tennis player
- Melinda Gainsford-Taylor, Australian athlete
- Melinda Geiger, Romanian handballer
- Melinda Hale, American handball player
- Mélinda Hennaoui, Algerian volleyball player
- Melinda Henshaw, New Zealand yachtswoman
- Melinda Jacques, French handball player
- Melinda Kunhegyi, Canadian figure skater
- Melinda McLeod, Australian BMX cyclist
- Melinda Padovano, American wrestler
- Melinda Pastrovics, Hungarian handballer
- Melinda Patyi, Hungarian canoeist
- Melinda Sun, Australian badminton player
- Melinda Szikora, Hungarian handballer
- Melinda Szik, Hungarian weightlifter
- Melinda Szvorda, Hungarian footballer
- Melinda Vernon, Australian triathlete
- Melinda Vincze, Hungarian handballer
- Melinda Wang, Taiwanese figure skater
- Melinda Watpool, Canadian boxer
- Melinda Young, Australia basketball

=== Writers ===
- Melinda Camber Porter, British author, poet and painter
- Melinda Gebbie, American comic author and artist
- Melinda Hammond, British romance novelist
- Melinda Haynes, American novelist
- Melinda Hsu Taylor, American TV writer and producer
- Malinda Lo, American author
- Melinda Lopez, American playwright
- Melinda Metz, American children's author
- Melinda Nadj Abonji, Hungarian writer and performance artist
- Melinda Rankin (1811–1888), American missionary, teacher, and writer
- Melinda Smith, Australian poet
- Melinda M. Snodgrass, American science fiction writer
- Melinda Tankard Reist, Australian writer and social campaigner
- Melinda Wagner, American composer and Pulitzer Prize winner

=== Other ===
- Melinda Loveless, American teenager convicted for her role in the 1992 murder of Shanda Sharer

== In popular culture ==
=== In film and television ===
- Melinda (film), American film, 1972
- Melinda and Melinda, American film, 2005
- Melinda Gordon, Jennifer Love Hewitt's character from Ghost Whisperer
- Melinda from The Real World: Austin
- Melinda Warren and Melinda Halliwell, from TV show Charmed
- Melinda Warner, Medical examiner on Law & Order: Special Victims Unit
- Melinda Cramer, character on One Life to Live
- Melinda May from Agents of S.H.I.E.L.D.
- "Melinda" (Agents of S.H.I.E.L.D.), episode
- Melinda, a centaur from the Disney movie Fantasia
- Melinda Finster, Chuckie's late mother from the animated children's TV series Rugrats

=== In music ===
- "Melinda" by Curved Air, on the album Retrospective
- "Melinda" by Tom Petty and the Heartbreakers

=== In literature ===
- Melinda, wife of Bánk in József Katona's legendary historical tragedy Bánk bán
- Melinda ("Lindy") in the book The Last of the Really Great Whangdoodles by Julie Andrews
- Melinda Sordino, main character of the book Speak (1999) by Laurie Halse Anderson
- Melinda, porn star mentioned in the book Snow by Orhan Pamuk
- Melinda, picture book written by Neil Gaiman and illustrated by Dagmara Matusak

== In geography ==
- Melinda Airport, Belize
