= Emperor Min =

Emperor Min (愍帝, 閔帝) may refer to:

- King Min of Qi (reigned 324 or 300–284 BC), briefly proclaiming himself as Di (帝, a title higher than "king") until 288 BC
- Emperor Xian of Han (181–234, reigned 189–220), also known as Emperor Min of Han
- Emperor Min of Jin (300–318, reigned 313–316), emperor of the Western Jin Dynasty
- Xiao Yuanming (died 556, reigned in 555), Emperor Min of Liang
- Emperor Jiemin of Northern Wei (498–532, reigned 531–532)
- Emperor Xiaomin of Northern Zhou (542–557, reigned 557)
- Emperor Yang of Sui (569–618, reigned 604–618), also known as Emperor Min of Sui
- Li Conghou (914–934, reigned 933–934), also known as Emperor Min of Later Tang
- Emperor Aizong of Jin (1198–1234, reigned 1224–1234), also known as Emperor Min of Jin
- Chongzhen Emperor (1611–1644, reigned 1627–1644), also known as Emperor Min of Ming

== See also ==
- Emperor Mẫn (愍帝)
