= Melinda Tan =

Singaporean academic

Melinda Tan MBE is an academic who is currently rector of the University of Central Lancashire campus in the UN Buffer Zone in Cyprus.

== Career ==
Melinda Tan received a Bachelor of Arts degree in English language and literature in 1991 from the National University of Singapore and a post graduate diploma in education from the same institution in 1992. She was awarded a Master of Arts degree in English language teaching and applied linguistics from the University of Nottingham in 1997. Tan remained with the university to study for a doctor of philosophy degree, lecturing there during this time. She received her doctorate in applied linguistics in 2000. Tan lectured at Assumption University in Bangkok from 2001 and at the University of Central Lancashire (Uclan) from 2004. She was appointed dean of Uclan's School of Languages and International Studies in 2010 and in 2012–13 was academic lead for the university's Thailand campus project.

In October 2013 Tan was appointed rector of Uclan's Cyprus campus, replacing Lee Chatfield upon his retirement. The campus had been opened in the UN Buffer Zone between the Republic of Cyprus and Northern Cyprus in October 2012. The campus came in for some criticism as it made losses in its first two years and some alleged that Tan was the only UK academic on the site, a claim denied by Uclan. The location in the buffer zone was criticised by UN leader Ban Ki-moon as a violation of the spirit of the zone.

Tan spoke at the opening of the 2014 Cyprus session of the European Youth Parliament. In May 2017 she negotiated an agreement with the British Sovereign Base Areas Police to provide professional development programmes to them. Tan returned to the university's Preston campus in August 2017 and was appointed director of business development at the Faculty of Culture and the Creative Industries. She was appointed a Member of the Order of the British Empire in the 2018 New Year Honours.
