= Mindy Jacobsen =

Mindy Jacobsen (born Miami, Florida) is the first blind woman to be ordained as a hazzan (also called a cantor) in the history of Judaism; she was ordained in 1978 by Hebrew Union College. She has been blind since birth as a result of retinopathy of prematurity, and was one of the first group of blind children to attend public school in Miami; she was also the first blind member of her local SING OUT cast (a branch of Up with People), and later founded a cast in Tallahassee, Florida. She is the First Vice President of the National Federation of the Blind of New York.
