= Melinda Szvorda =

Hungarian footballer

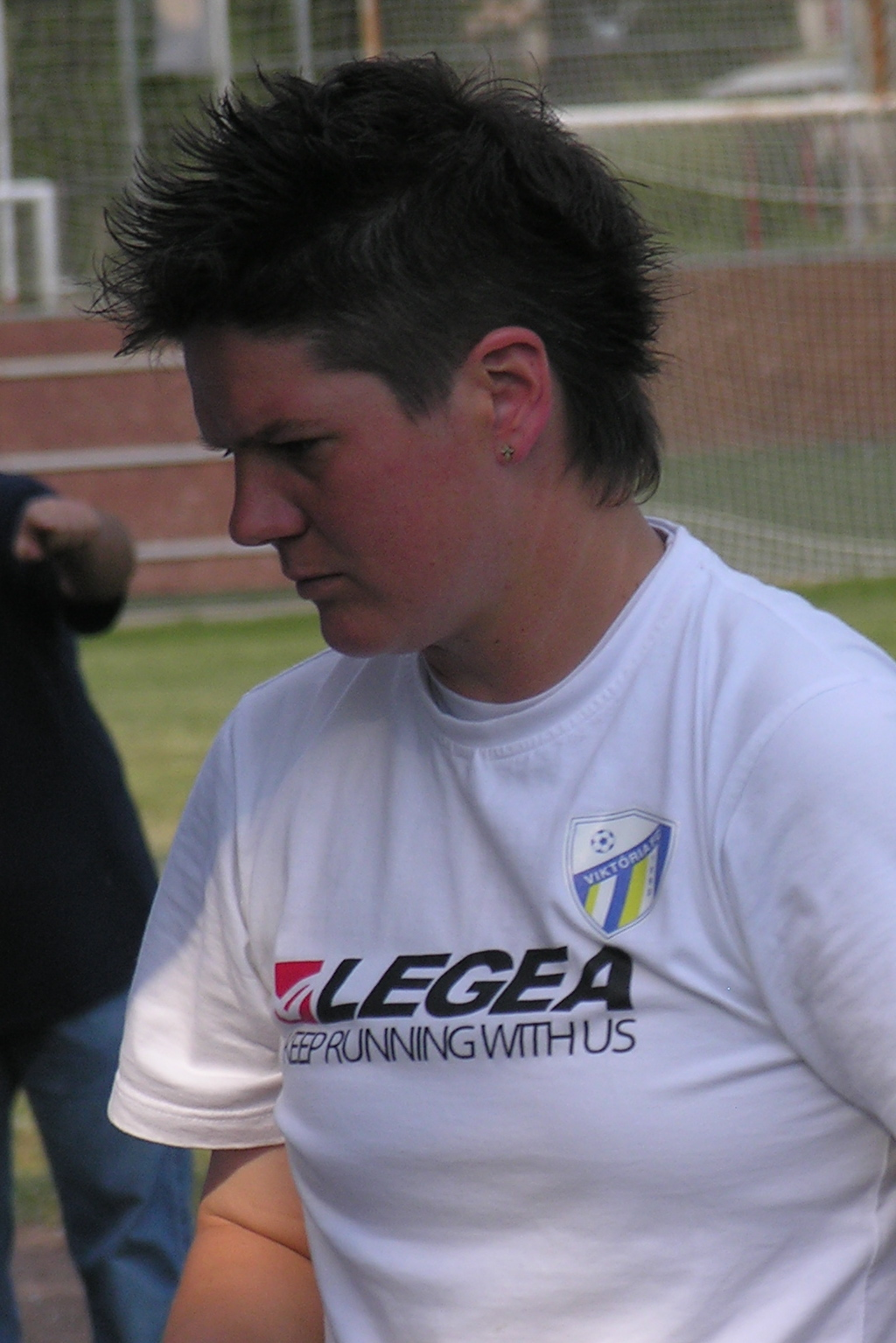

Personal information
- Full name: Melinda Szvorda
- Date of birth: 5 August 1980 (age 46)
- Place of birth: Hungary
- Position: Goalkeeper

Senior career*
Years	Team	Apps	(Gls)
- Miskolc
- Győri ETO
2003–2010	Viktória FC-Szombathely		
2010–2011	Wolfsburg	0	(0)
2011	Győri Dózsa		
2011–2012	Pomurje	7	(0)
2012–	Südburgenland		(0)

International career^{‡}
2001–2008	Hungary	39	(0)
- * Club domestic league appearances and goals ‡ National team caps and goals as of 3 May 2008

Melinda Szvorda (born 5 August 1980) is a Hungarian football goalkeeper, currently playing for FC Südburgenland in the Austrian Frauenliga. She has been a member of the Hungarian national team.
