= Vaca Falls Railway =

Logging railway in Belize

Coordinates: 17.0262165°N 89.064944°W

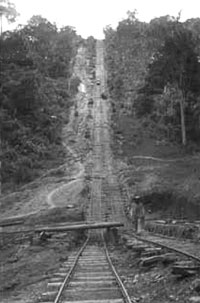
- Incline of the Vaca Falls Railway

Technical
- Line length: 15 miles (24 km)
- Track gauge: 3 ft (914 mm)

The Vaca Falls Railway was a 15-mile (24 km) long 3 ft (914 mm) gauge logging railway between the Vaca Falls and the Chiquibui Forest on the Mountain Pine Ridge in Belize.

== History ==
The Vaca Falls Railway was operated as a funicular, using Montania benzene locomotives manufactured in Nordhausen. It was probably built in the mid-1920s by the Mengel Company of Kentucky, and used for transporting mahogany logs. The track belonged to the Belize Estate and Produce Company Ltd. and was in use until 1952.

Old tracks, locomotives and parts, which had been made in Alabama in 1926 are still in situ on the farm of the Morales family in the bush at the Che Chem Ha Cave on the Vaca Plateau in the area of Arenal, south of Benque Viejo del Carmen.

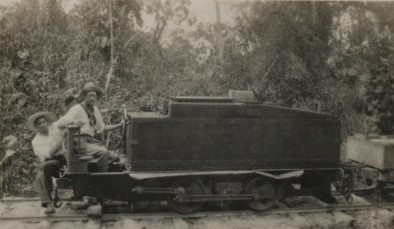
Montania locomotive

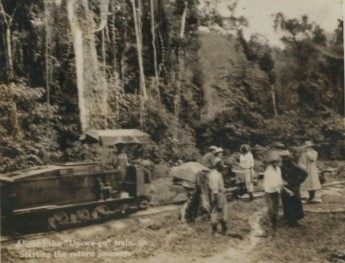
Starting the return journey aboard the 'Up we go' train

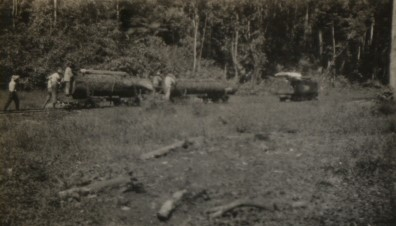
Upgrade, Vaca Tramway

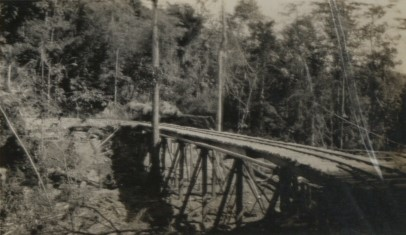
Sapodilla trestle bridge

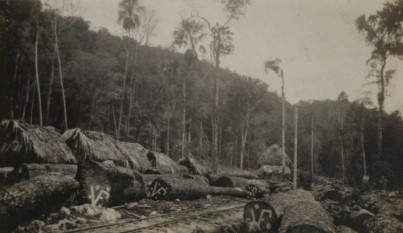
VF logs
