= Melike =

- Pronunciation: [meliːˈce]
- Gender: Female

Origin
- Origin: Arabic
- Meaning: Queen
- Region of origin: Turkey

Other names
- Related names: Malika

Melike is a Turkish female given name, and it means queen.

People named Melike include the following:

- Melike Bakırcıoğlu, Turkish basketball player
- Melike Günal (born 1998), Turkish weightlifter
- Melike Kasapoğlu (born 2004), Turkish handballer
- Melike Mama Hatun, female ruler of the Saltuklu dynasty
- Melike Öztürk (born 2001), Turkish footballer
- Melike Pekel (born 1995), Turkish-German footballer
- Melike Tarhan, Turkish music artist
