= Minda (village) =

Indian Village

Coordinates: 30°58′N 77°42′E

Minda (or Mindha)is a village located in the Nawa tehsil under Nagaur district, in the state of Rajasthan, India. It is one of 217 villages in nawa Block along with villages like Takiya, Thikariya and Naya Bas, Bawari dariya ka bas. Nearby railway station is Minda railway station which is in between Renwal and Bhainslana stations. This railway track starts from Delhi, Gurgaon, Rewari, Narnaul, Ringus, Renwal, Minda, Phulera and up to Ajmer. However, Jaipur Railway Station is major railway station 58 km near to Minda via Phulera.

Minda is situated in western side from State capital Jaipur with 64 km distance. Further more, It is located 184 km towards East from District headquarters Nagaur & 67 km from Kuchaman. Minda Pin code is 341509 and postal head office is Nawacity Lsg. Deola, Deoli Kalan, Shekhawatpura, Dediya Ka Bss(Bijarniyo ki dhani), Takiya, Naya Bas, Baori, Thikariya Khurd, Bheevpura, Moondgasoi (13 km), Loonwa (17 km) are the nearby Villages to Minda.

Marwari is the first and local language here followed by Hindi, Urdu, English.

== Facilities ==
Minda village having some common facilities like market, temples and Mosque, schools, Hospitals and medicine shops, play ground between houses, sitting spaces under large shade trees, wells, wastelands, grazing grounds, pigeonry and cremation grounds etc.

== Economy ==
The economy of villagers is based on agriculture. Many people depend on agriculture and dairy for their livelihood. Some people, especially the Kumawat caste, are depending on building construction works as skilled labour (Mistri), labour, or by selling building materials etc. Many families in this village are dependent on leather works (Juti and mojri preparation). The village is excellent in education and many of the people are government servants.

== Nearby railway stations ==
Mindha- 2 km, Badhal- 26 km, Bheslana- 15 km, Renwal- 7 Km,milakpur 17km

== Airports ==
- Sanganeer Airport, Jaipur- 66 km
- Indira Gandhi International Airport, Delhi- 266 km
- Jodhpur Airport- 273 km
