= Mindy Budgor =

American businesswoman and author

Mindy Budgor is an American businesswoman and the author of Warrior Princess: My Quest to Become the First Female Maasai Warrior.

== Biography ==
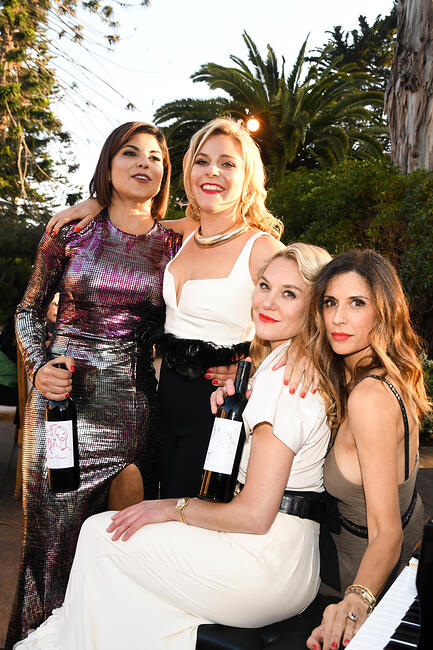
Mindy Budgor (far left) at an event

Budgor is a 2012 graduate of the University of Chicago Booth School of Business. She started her first company while an undergraduate at the University of Wisconsin. At age 27, before starting her Chicago course, she spent three months on charity work at the Masai Mara National Reserve, Kenya. While there, she claims to have become the first female Maasai warrior, which women had traditionally not been allowed to do. Budgor published a memoir titled Warrior Princess: My Quest to Become the First Female Maasai Warrior (2013).

== Controversy ==
Budgor has received criticism for her claim to have become the first female Maasai warrior. The critics write that her book simplifies the Maasai culture and trivializes the process of becoming a Maasai warrior. Becoming a Maasai warrior is a process that takes an average of 15 years, but Budgor writes that she completed the process in three months.
