= Stann Creek Railway =

Stann Creek
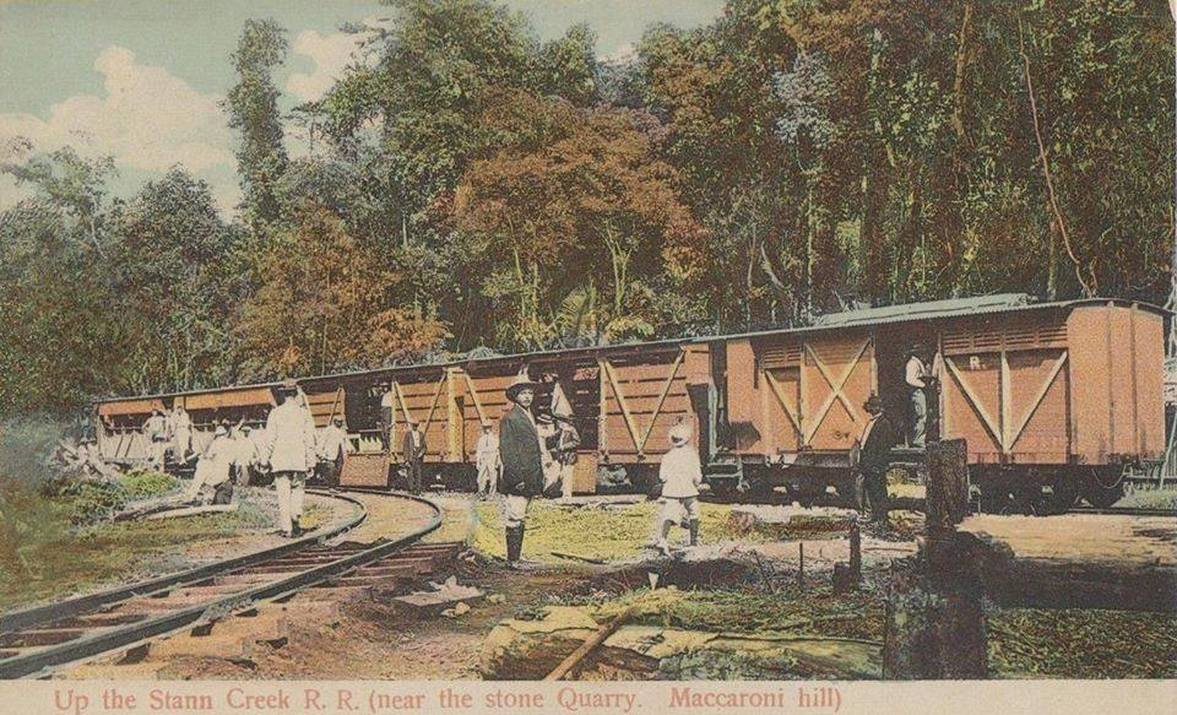
- Up the Stann Creek R. R. (near the stone Quarry, Maccaroni hill)

Technical
- Line length: 15 miles (24 km)
- Track gauge: 3 ft (914 mm)

The Stann Creek Railway was used from 1908 to 1938 as a 25 miles (40 km) long 3 ft (914 mm) gauge narrow gauge railway from Commerce Bight to Middlesex in Belize.

== Background ==
The British Honduras Syndicate opened a mule-drawn railway in 1892 from its main office in Melinda to Sacred Heart Church at the pier in Stann Creek Town, which proved to be useful.

== Construction ==
The route was built by the colonial government of British Honduras, with the help of Jamaican immigrant workers, for a well above budget total of BH$ 846,140 or about £ 123,000, or about € 15 million, adjusted for inflation. It had a gauge of 3 feet (914 mm) and was opened in sections from 17 October 1908 to 31 March 1911. It took a detour through the banana plantations on Melinda Road and Old Mullins River Road. The bridges were designed as steel bridges with concrete foundations.

== Operation ==
Four coal-fired steam locomotives were used for the operation. They were stationed at Hope Creek, at Mile 15, at Mile 21 and in Middlesex.

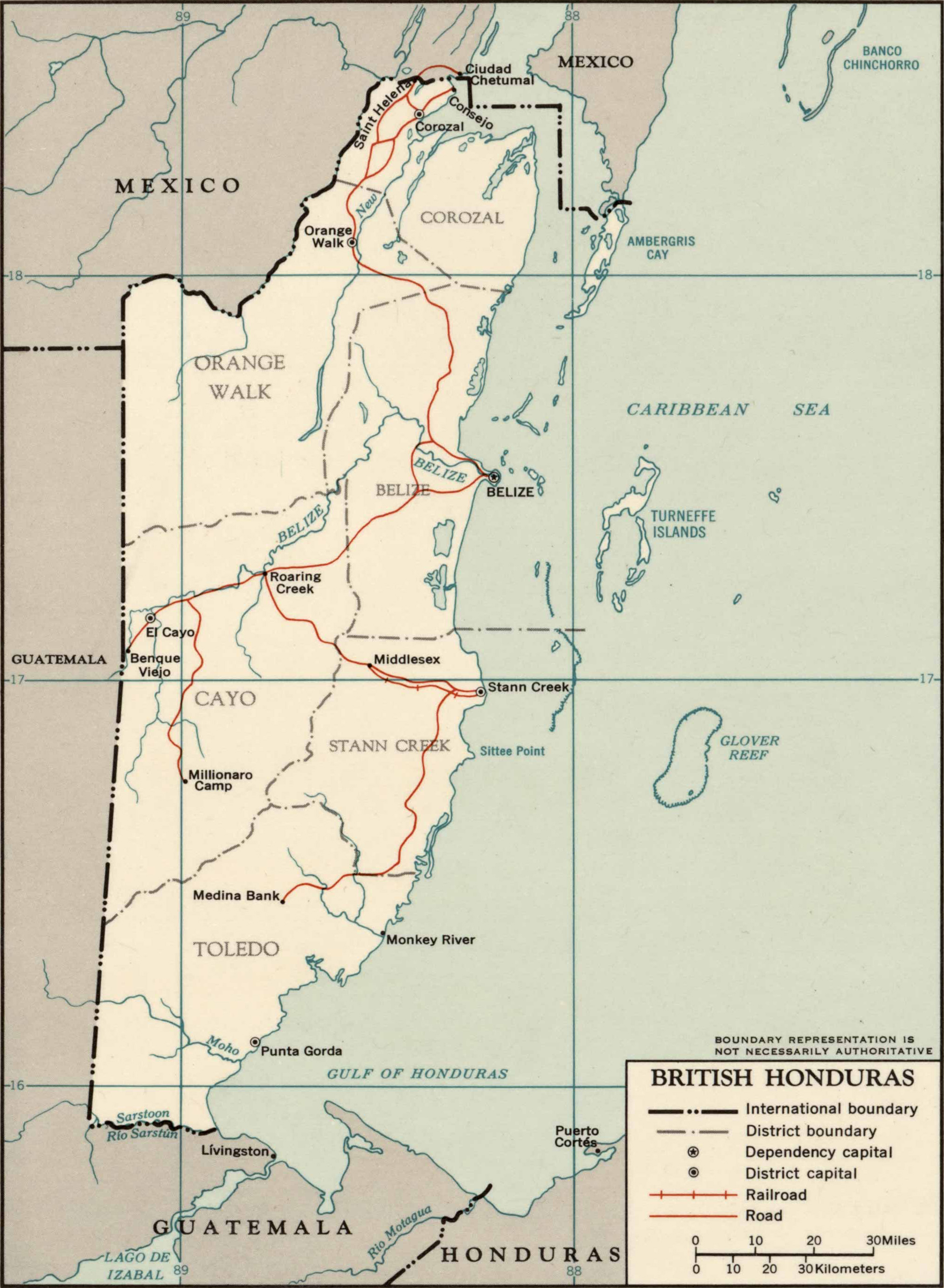
British Honduras, 1965, showing Stann Creek Railway

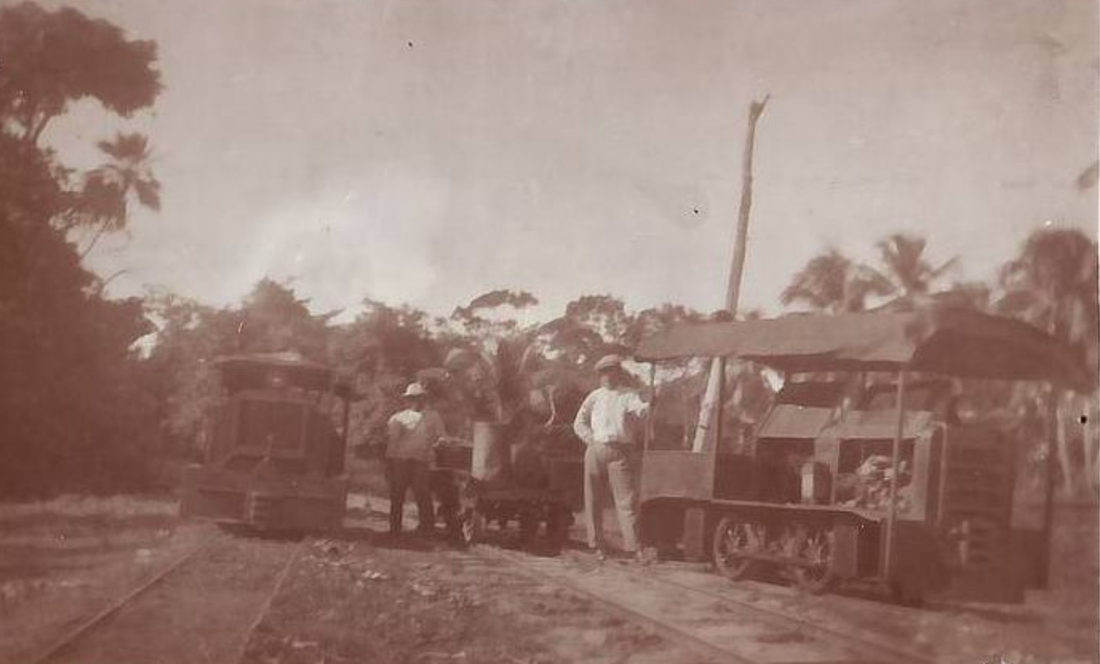
Diesel locomotives in a banana plantation

After banana production was reduced to 5,000 stems a week in 1924 and the United Fruit Company ceased operations, the government procured two diesel shunting locomotives capable of handling the entire line at 8 mph (13 km/h).

From 1925, the United States based Tidewater Lumber Company used the railroad to transport mahogany wood from Middlesex to the Commerce Bight pier for shipment to the United States of America. After the decline of the timber industry in Stann Creek Valley in 1929, the railway was still used in the 1930s for passenger transport. The United Fruit Company used the Stann Creek Railway until 1937. The track was dismantled in 1938 and reused elsewhere in Belize and Jamaica.
