= Rail transport in Mexico =

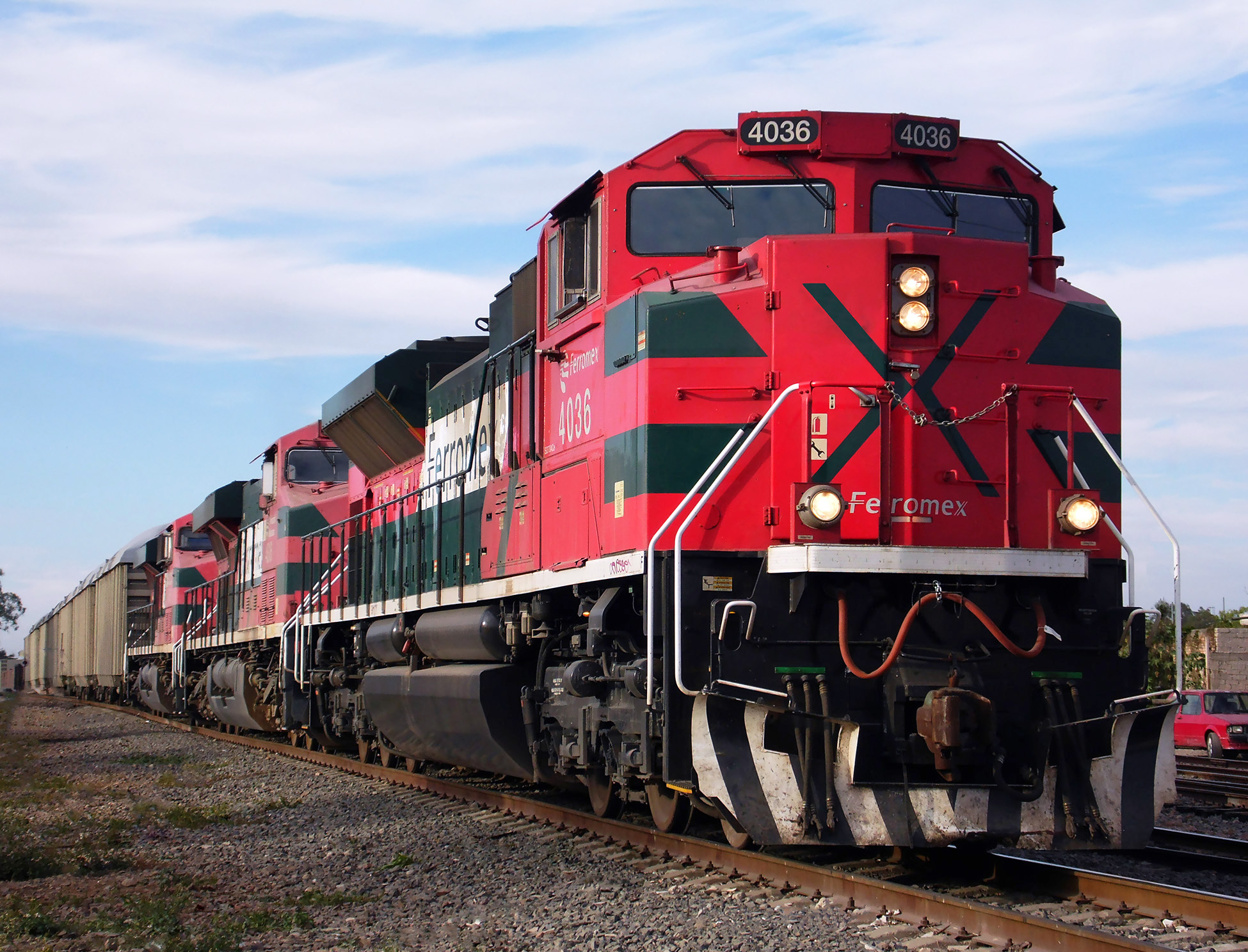
Ferromex, one of the largest freight rail operators in Mexico.

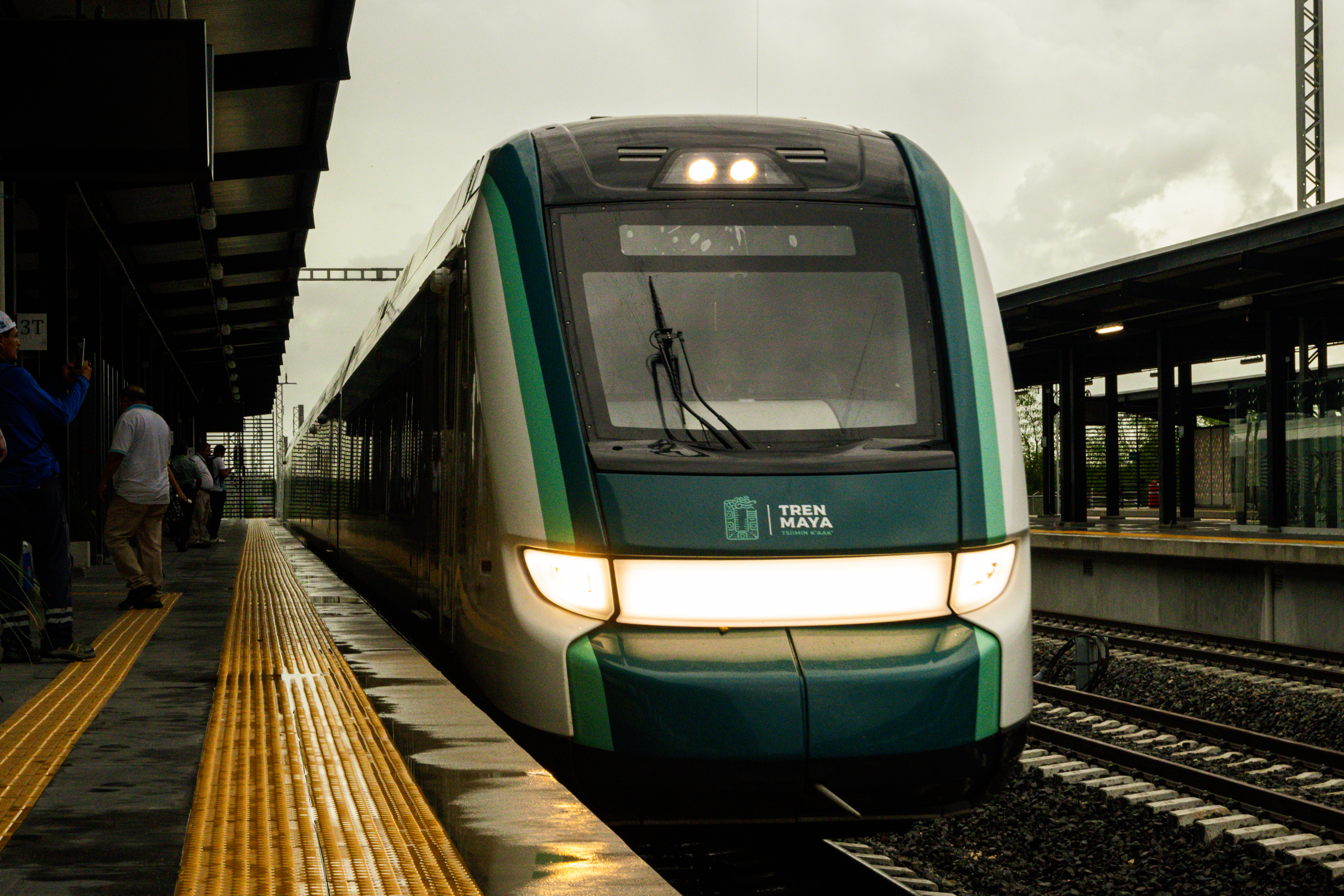
Tren Maya, one of the newly built passenger rail systems in Mexico.

Rail transport in Mexico is made up of both freight rail and passenger rail networks using standard gauge (1,435 mm/4 ft 8.5 in), along with rapid transit and light rail networks that are part of local public transport systems. Until 1997, rail transport in Mexico was under the control of the now-defunct, state-owned Ferrocarriles Nacionales de México (N de M). Since 2026, rail transport in Mexico is overseen by the Agencia de Trenes y Transporte Público Integrado (ATTRAPI).

Its freight rail network owned by the national government and operated by various private rail companies under concessions (charters). These companies include Ferromex, Ferrosur, and Canadian Pacific Kansas City (CPKC). New freight rail systems have been inaugurated as part of the Tren Maya and Tren Interoceánico. The system connects major industrial centers with ports and with rail connections at the United States border.

Its passenger rail network has been undergoing a major expansion since the late 2000s and ramped up recently since 2018. In 2008, Mexico's first commuter rail service, known as the Tren Suburbano, was inaugurated between Mexico City's Buenavista station and the State of Mexico. In 2023, several portions of many passenger rail projects opened. The first sections of the Tren Maya opened in December 2023, bringing passenger rail service to the Yucatán Peninsula. In September 2023, the first sections of the Tren El Insurgente opened in Toluca and its full route to Mexico City's Observatorio station opened in 2026. Also in September 2023, the first portions of the Tren Interoceánico opened in the Isthmus de Tehuantepec. In 2025, several new passenger rail services began construction, including the Tren Ciudad de México–Querétaro, Tren Ciudad de México–Pachuca, Tren Querétaro–Irapuato, and Tren Saltillo–Nuevo Laredo.

Mexico's three largest metropolitan areas are served by various rapid transit and light rail networks. Mexico City is served by the Mexico City Metro and Mexico City Light Rail. Guadalajara is served by the Sistema de Tren Eléctrico Urbano. Monterrey is served by the Metrorrey.

== History ==
=== Construction ===
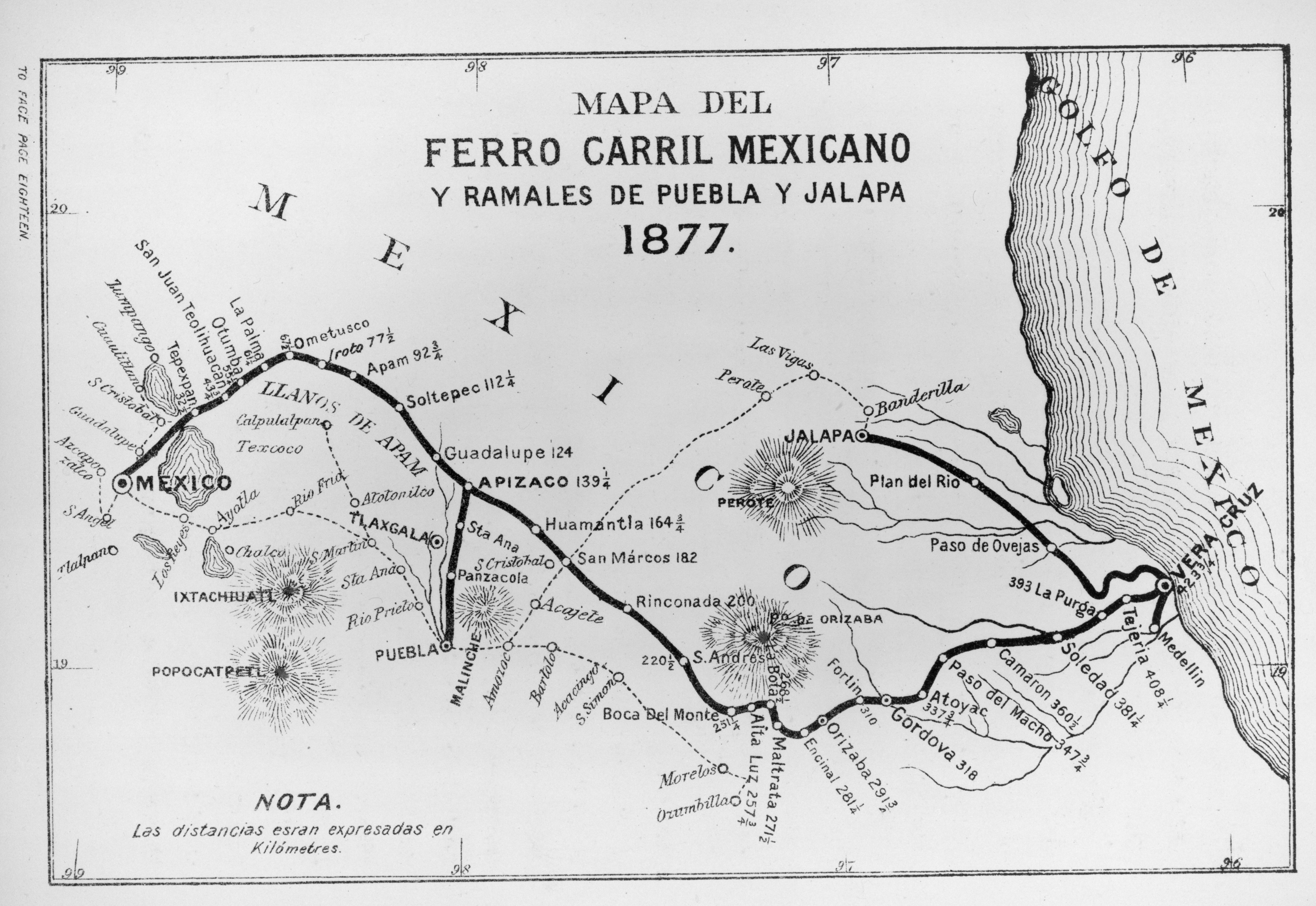
Map of first Mexican rail line between Veracruz and Mexico City

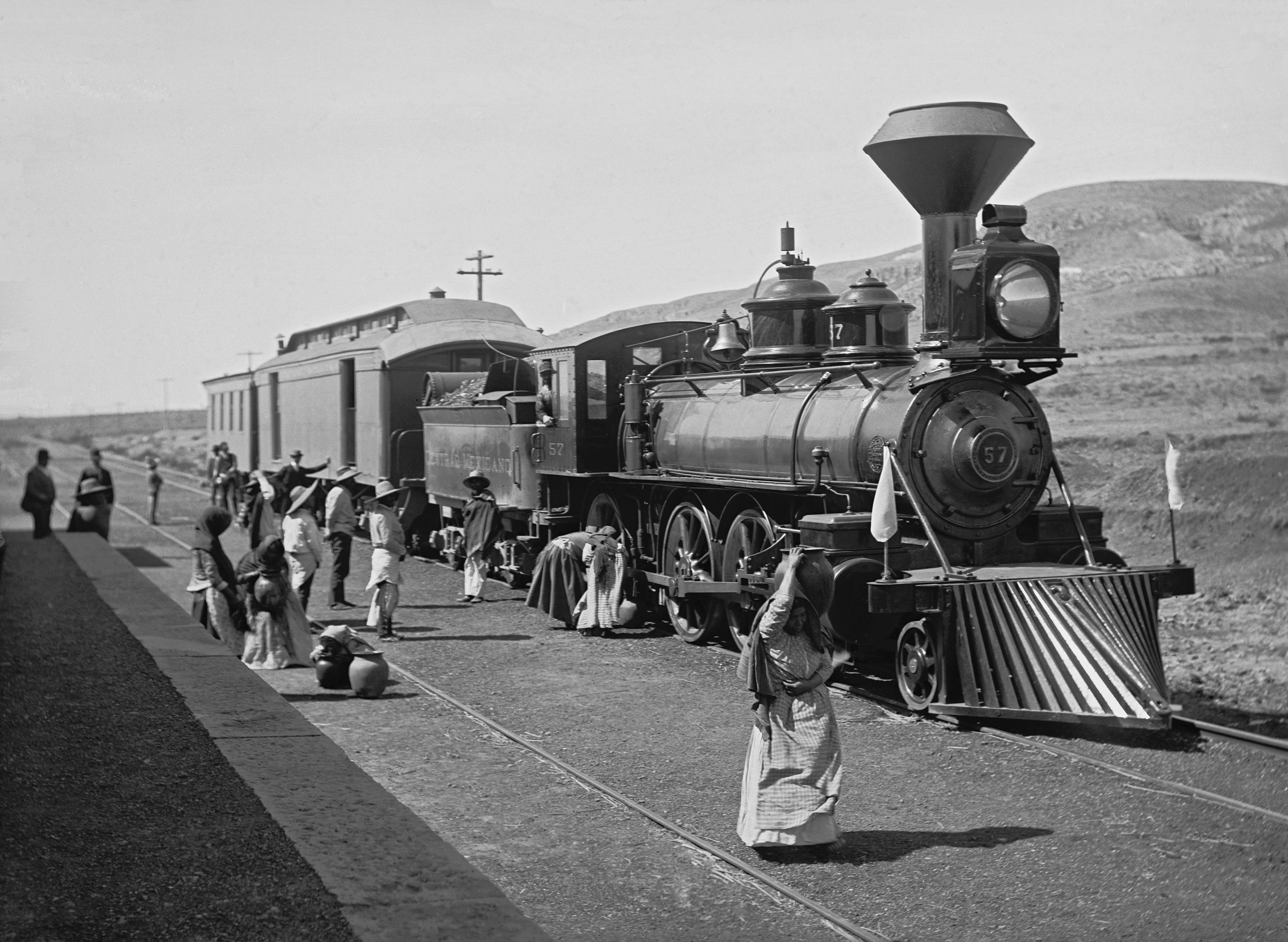
Mexican Central Railway train at station, Mexico

Mexico's rail history began in 1837, with the granting of a concession for a railroad to be built between Veracruz, on the Gulf of Mexico, and Mexico City. However, no railroad was built under that concession.

In 1857, Don Antonio Escandón secured the right to build a line from the Atlantic Ocean port of Veracruz to Mexico City and on to the Pacific Ocean. Revolution and political instability stifled progress on the financing or construction of the line until 1864, when, under the regime of Emperor Maximilian, the Imperial Mexican Railway Company began construction of the line. Political upheaval continued to stifle progress, and the initial segment from Veracruz to Mexico City was inaugurated nine years later on January 1, 1873, by President Sebastián Lerdo de Tejada.

President Lerdo and his successor Porfirio Díaz encouraged further rail development through generous concessions that included government subsidies for construction.

=== Impacts of the Diaz Administration ===
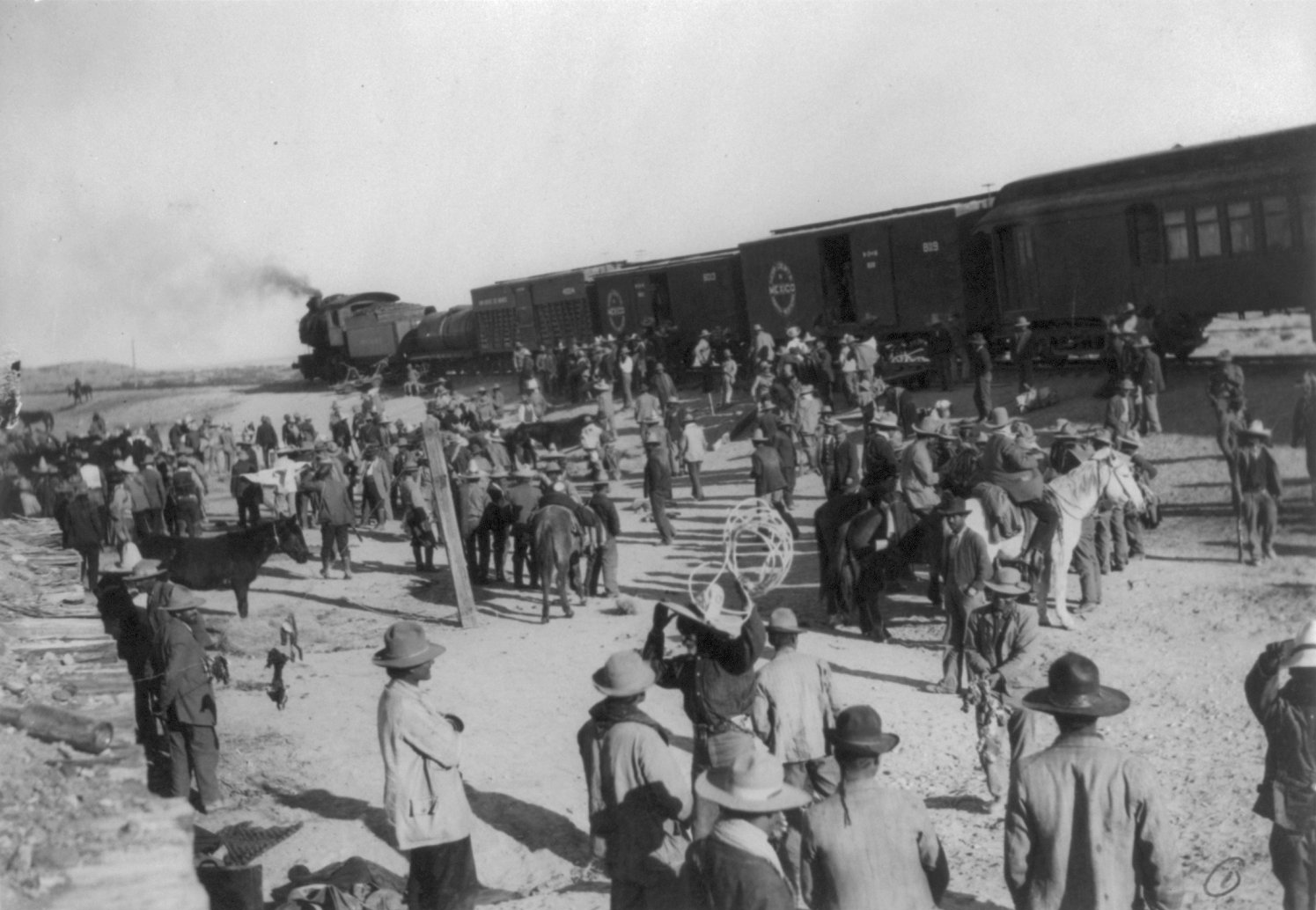
Rebel soldiers moving by rail during the Mexican Revolution

At the beginning of his first term Díaz inherited 398 miles (640.5 km) of railroads consisting almost exclusively of the British-owned Mexican Railway. By the end of his second term in 1910, Mexico boasted 15,360 miles (24,720 km) of in-service track, mostly built by American, British and French investors.

From a small start, the railway network expanded significantly, linking many parts of the country previously isolated. The Interoceanic Railway linked Mexico City to the port of Veracruz; the Monterrey and Mexican Railroad linked that northern city with the Gulf Coast port of Tampico; the Southern Pacific of Mexico linked west coast cities from Guaymas to Mazatlan; the Sonora Railway linked Nogales to the port of Guaymas; and the Mexican Central Railroad went north to the U.S. border at El Paso, Texas. The British invested £7.4 million in railways during the decade of the 1880s, jumping to £53.4 million in 1910s. The decade-total of new investment in mining went from £1.3 million in 1880s to £11.6 million in 1910s. Investments in land and other properties rose from near zero in 1880s to £19.7 million in 1910s. The totals reached £135 million, almost as much as the United States.

In the late nineteenth century, railroads were becoming symbols of centralized power, political and monetary, in Mexico. The institution of rail systems in the country required new regulations and legislation for residents and railroad development. There was great debate surrounding the early railroads in Mexico, regarding how much they were truly improving the country. Scholars view the rail systems as simultaneously encouraging rapid economic growth and commercial relationships while displacing the population and creating widespread poverty within the sectors that were run by the rail systems. Porfirio Díaz had developed his country but at the expense of his people. Much of the criticism levied toward Díaz regarded his rapid modernization in a country still rebuilding from its internal conflicts.

Growing nationalistic fervor in Mexico led the Díaz administration to bring the bulk of the nation's railroads under national control through a plan drafted by his Minister of Finance, José Yves Limantour. The plan, implemented in 1909, created a new government corporation, Ferrocarriles Nacionales de México (FNM), which would exercise control of the main trunk rail lines through a majority of share ownership.

=== Nationalization ===
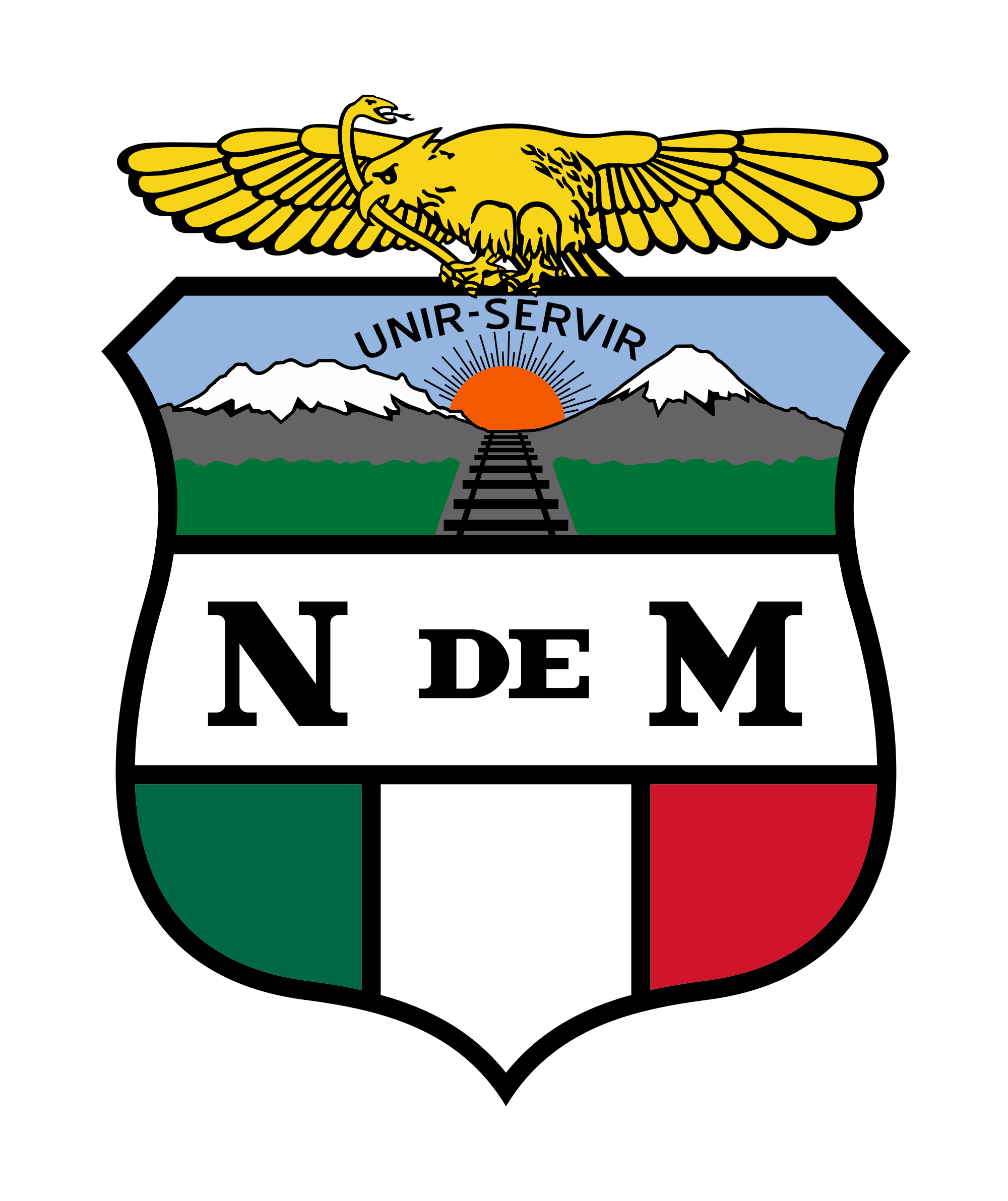
Ferrocarriles Nacionales de México

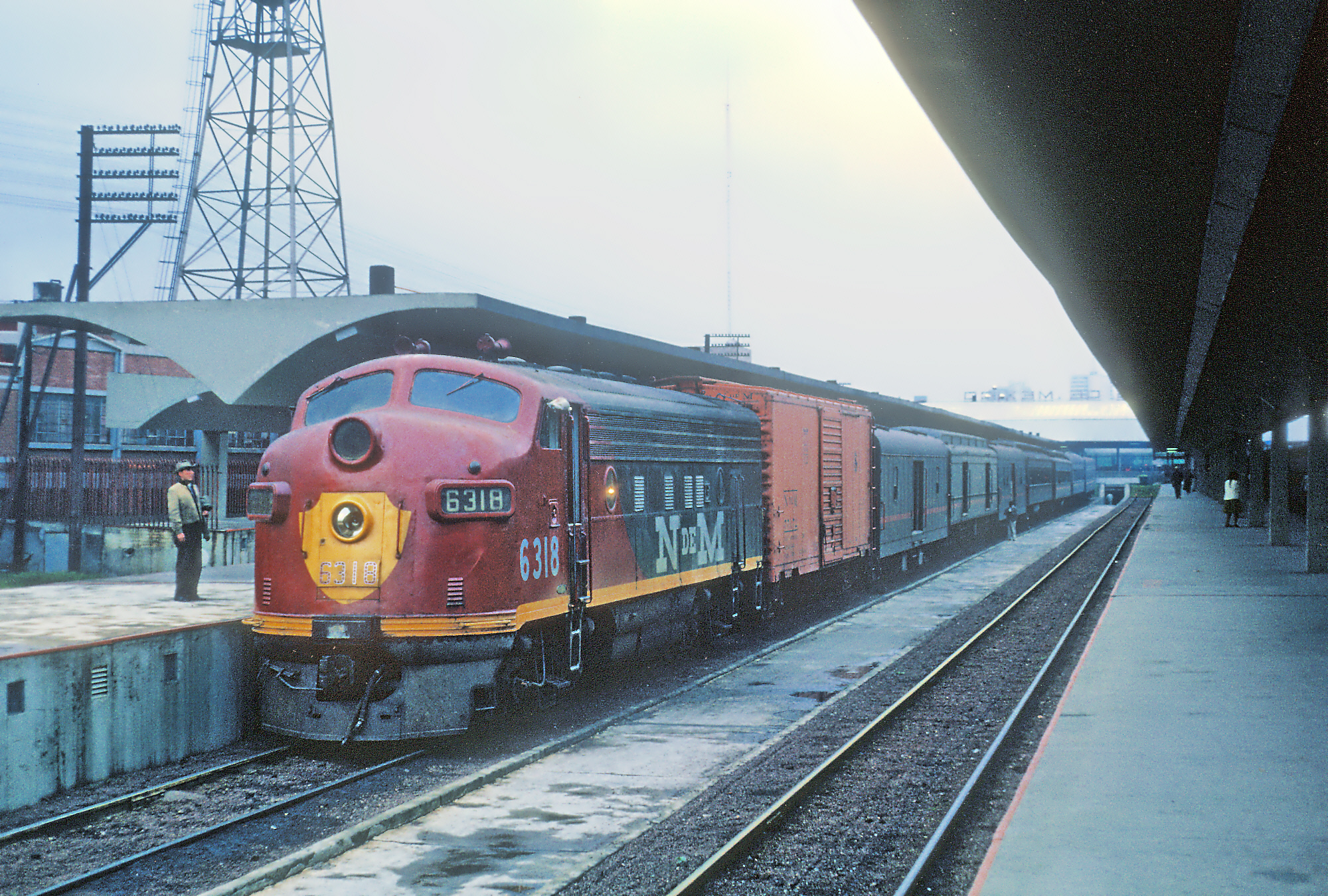
Buenavista railway station in the 1960s

Ferrocarril Nacional de México, incorporated in Colorado in 1880 as Mexican National Railway, was built on narrow-gauge railroad tracks under the instruction of General William Jackson Palmer of the Denver and Rio Grande Railway. The main line from Mexico City to Nuevo Laredo was constructed using the 3-ft narrow gauge tracks. From Saltillo, Coahuila to Concepción del Oro, Zacatecas, the FCNM built narrow-gauge tracks in 1903 to service mining operations. A likely reason for this, aside from General Palmer's preference for the narrow gauge in use of mining, is that narrow gauge is more cost efficient. In 1901, however, the tracks began conversion to standard gauge.

The rail system deteriorated greatly from neglect during the period of the Mexican Revolution. Following the Revolution, the entirety of the Mexican rail system was nationalized between 1929 and 1937.

During the 1950s, the Yucatán Peninsula experienced successful development as it integrated into the national network. In Oaxaca, on June 26, 1958, union workers from the Sindicato de Trabajadores Ferrocarrileros de la República Mexicana (STFRM), led by railroad worker and union activist Demetrio Vallejo, began a series of strikes seeking higher wages. When their demands remained unmet, a system-wide strike was called on January 18, 1959. The strike escalated on the afternoon of January 25 when Ferrocarriles Nacionales (the National Railway) officially began their strike action. By 10 a.m. the following day, an agreement had been reached that included medical care for workers' families, higher wages, and an allocation of 30 million pesos for the construction of affordable rental housing for the workers.

In 1987 the government merged its five regional railroads into FNM. During the later period of national ownership, FNM suffered significant financial difficulties, running an operating deficit of $552 million (37 percent of its operating budget) in 1991. Competition from trucking and shipping decreased railroad's share of the total freight market to about 9 percent, or about half of rail's share a decade earlier.

=== Privatization ===
In 1995, the Mexican government announced that the FNM would be privatized and divided into four main systems. As part of the restructuring for privatization, FNM suspended passenger rail service in 1997.

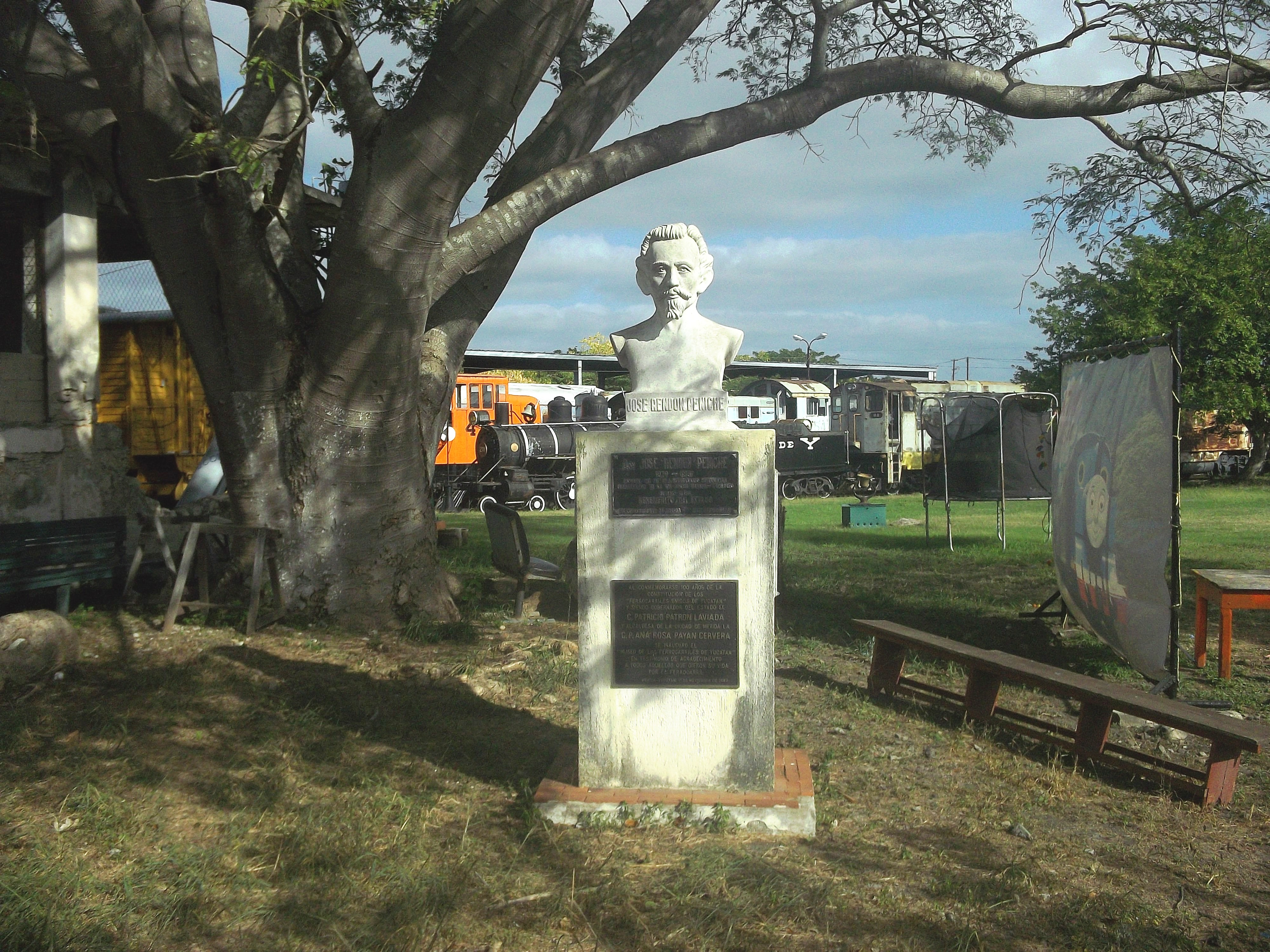
Bust of Jose Rendón Peniche who worked in the construction and then had charge the general direction of the first railway Yucatan, route Mérida-Progreso

In 1996, Kansas City Southern (KCS), in a joint venture with Transportacion Maritima Mexicana (TMM), bought the Northeast Railroad concession that linked Mexico City, Monterrey, the Pacific port at Lázaro Cárdenas and the border crossing at Laredo. The company was initially called Transportación Ferroviaria Mexicana (TFM), but was renamed Kansas City Southern de México (KCSM) in 2005 when KCS bought out TMM's interests. KCS's systems in the United States and Mexico jointly formed end-to-end rail system linking the heartlands of Mexico and the United States.

The Northwest Railroad concession, connecting Mexico City and Guadalajara with the Pacific port of Manzanillo and various crossings along the United States border was sold to a joint venture between Grupo México and Union Pacific Railroad in 1998 during the presidency of Dr. Ernesto Zedillo (which later occupied the position of Director of the Board of Union Pacific). The company operates as Ferrocarril Mexicano or Ferromex. Ferromex's freight volumes have increased; it hauled a record 22,365 million tonne-km in the first 6 months of 2010. Also, Ferrosur, the railroad serving Mexico City and cities/ports southeast of Mexico City, hauled their own record 3,565 million tonne-kilometers.

There were two southern concessions, merged in 2000 to form Ferrosur. Ferrosur operates the line between Mexico City and the Gulf of Mexico port of Veracruz. In 2005, Ferrosur was bought by Ferromex's parent company. KCSM challenged the acquisition and the merger failed to receive regulatory approval. However, in March 2011, a tribunal ruled in Grupo México's favor, and the merger was permitted.

The three major Mexican railroads jointly own Ferrocarril y Terminal del Valle de México (Ferrovalle) which operates railroads and terminals in and around Mexico City.

=== Revival of passenger service ===
In 2006, the Secretariat of Communications and Transport of Mexico proposed a high-speed rail link that would have transported passengers from Mexico City to Guadalajara, Jalisco, with stops in the cities of Querétaro, Guanajuato, Leon and Irapuato, along with a branch running from the port city of Manzanillo to Aguascalientes. The train would travel at 300 km/h, and would allow passengers to travel from Mexico City to Guadalajara in just 2 hours at an affordable price (the same trip by road takes 7 hours). The network was foreseen to eventually connect to Monterrey, Chilpancingo, Cuernavaca, Toluca, Puebla, Tijuana, Hermosillo, Cordoba, Veracruz, Oaxaca, Colima, Zacatecas, Torreon, Chihuahua, Puebla, San Luis Potosi, Mexicali, Saltillo, and Acapulco by 2015. The whole project was projected to cost 240 billion pesos, or about 25 billion dollars. Despite Mexican billionaire Carlos Slim's expressed interest in investing in high-speed rail, no progress was made on the proposal.

President Enrique Peña Nieto proposed a return to services of intercity trains. His administration's proposals included the Toluca–Mexico City commuter rail, which successfully launched construction in 2014 and went into service in 2023. They also included the Tren Maya, which would run throughout the Yucatan Peninsula, and whose construction eventually began in 2020 before opening in December 2023, and a Mexico City-Querétaro high speed rail line.

A consortium of China Railway Construction Corporation, Prodemex, Teya and GHP was awarded the contract to build the Mexico City-Querétaro high speed rail, at a cost of $3.75 billion dollars. However, the contract was cancelled the following year due to a series of corruption scandals. In 2015, Mexico opened a new tender, which was again revoked, leading to the Mexican government paying China Railway Construction Corporation a 1.31 million USD indemnification. The project was revived in July 2023 as an extension of the Cuatitlan commuter rail, when the Mexican government signed an agreement with Canadian Pacific Kansas City Railroad to study the viability of a passenger rail line from Mexico City to the city of Queretaro.

In September 2018, President-elect Andrés Manuel López Obrador announced a US$7.4 billion plan to build a tourist and freight railway on the Yucatán Peninsula. The project, named the Tren Maya, began construction in 2020 and will connect Palenque to Cancún, but remains controversial with environmentalists and indigenous rights activists. The new service debuted in 2023 and marked yet another chapter in the intercity revival, becoming the first train services in years to serve southern Mexico.

== Network ==
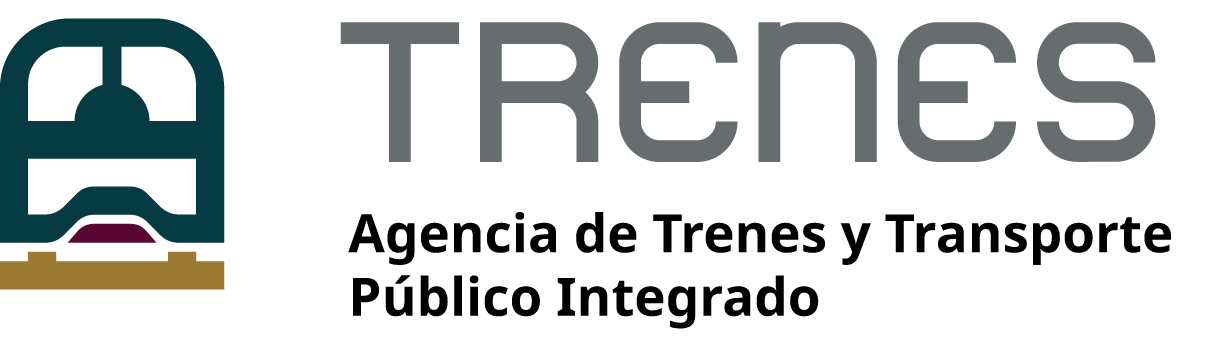
Agencia de Trenes y Transporte Público

Map of the railway system in Mexico

=== Freight ===
The major 'Class I' freight railroads in Mexico include:

- Canadian Pacific Kansas City (CPKC)
- Ferromex (FXE)

Short line railroads include:

- Baja California Railroad (BJRR)
- Ferrocarriles Chiapas-Mayab (FCCM)
- Ferrocarril y Terminal del Valle de México (Ferrovalle)
- Ferrosur (FSRR)
- Línea Coahuila Durango (LFCD)
- Tren Interoceánico

=== Passenger ===
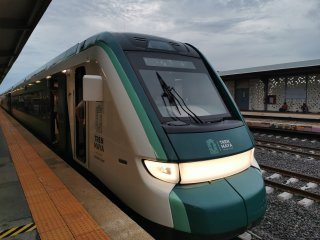
Tren Maya

==== Inter-city rail ====
- Tren Maya, a passenger service on the Yucatán Peninsula with top speeds of up to 99 miles per hour (159 km/h).
  - Section I: Palenque – Escárcega
  - Section II: Escárcega – Calkiní via S.F. Campeche
  - Section III: Calkiní – Izamal via Mérida-Teya
  - Section IV: Izamal – Cancún Airport via Chichén Itzá and Valladolid
  - Section V: Cancún Airport – Tulum via Playa del Carmen
  - Section VI: Tulum – Chetumal Airport
  - Section VII: Chetumal Airport – Escárcega
- Tren Interoceánico, a passenger service in the Isthmus of Tehuantepec, part of the Interoceanic Corridor.
  - Line FA: Coatzacoalcos – Pakal Ná
  - Line K: Ixtepec – Ciudad Hidalgo (near the Guatemala border)
  - Line Z: Coatzacoalcos – Salina Cruz

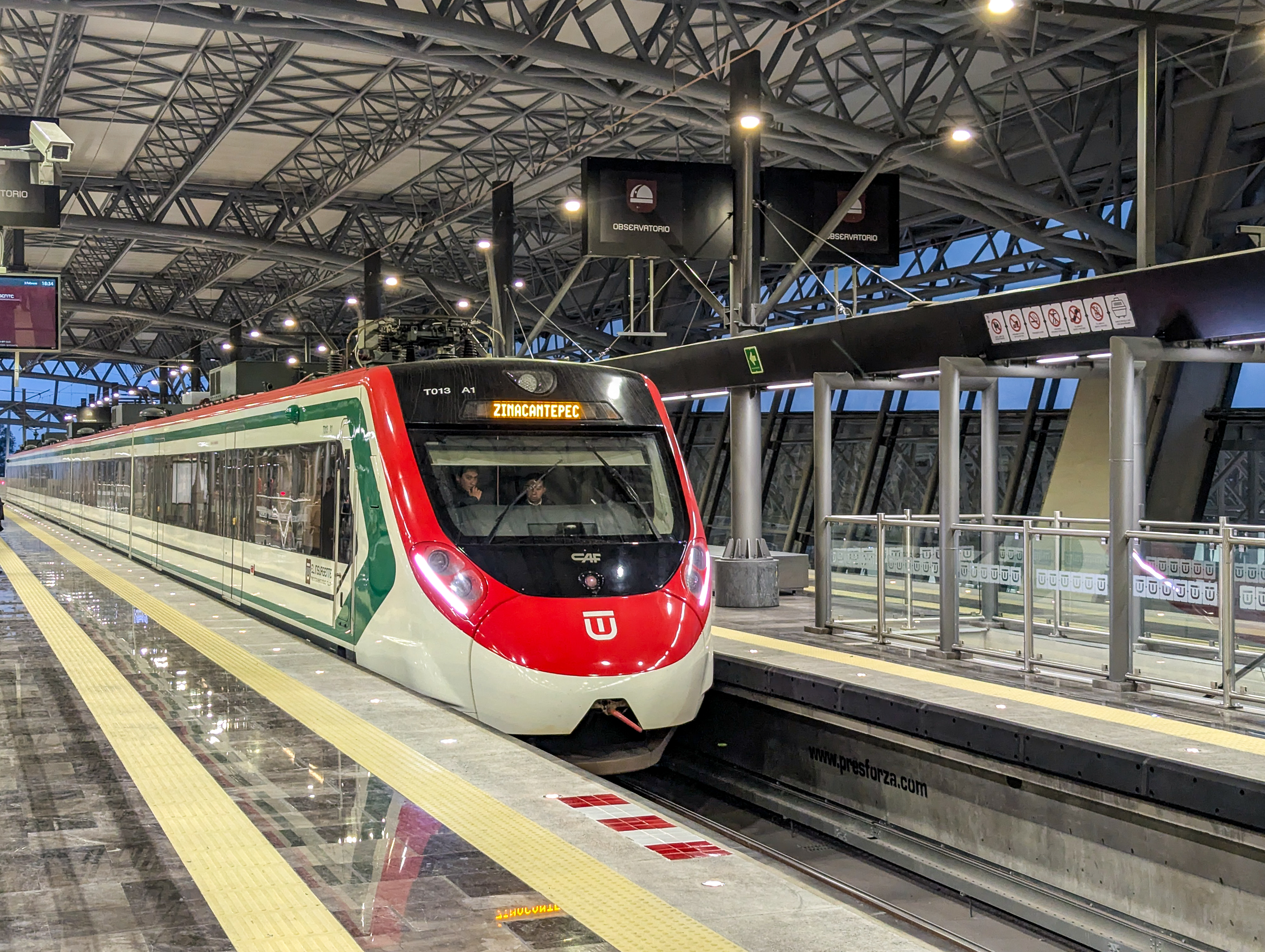
El Insurgente, part of the Tren Interurbano network.

==== Suburban and regional rail ====
- Tren Interoceánico
  - Tehuanito Norte: Salina Cruz – Unión Hidalgo
- Tren Interurbano
  - El Insurgente: Observatorio (Mexico City) – Zinacantepec
  - Felipe Ángeles: Buenavista (Mexico City) – AIFA-Clara Krause (Felipe Ángeles International Airport)
- Tren Suburbano: Buenavista (Mexico City) – Cuautitlán

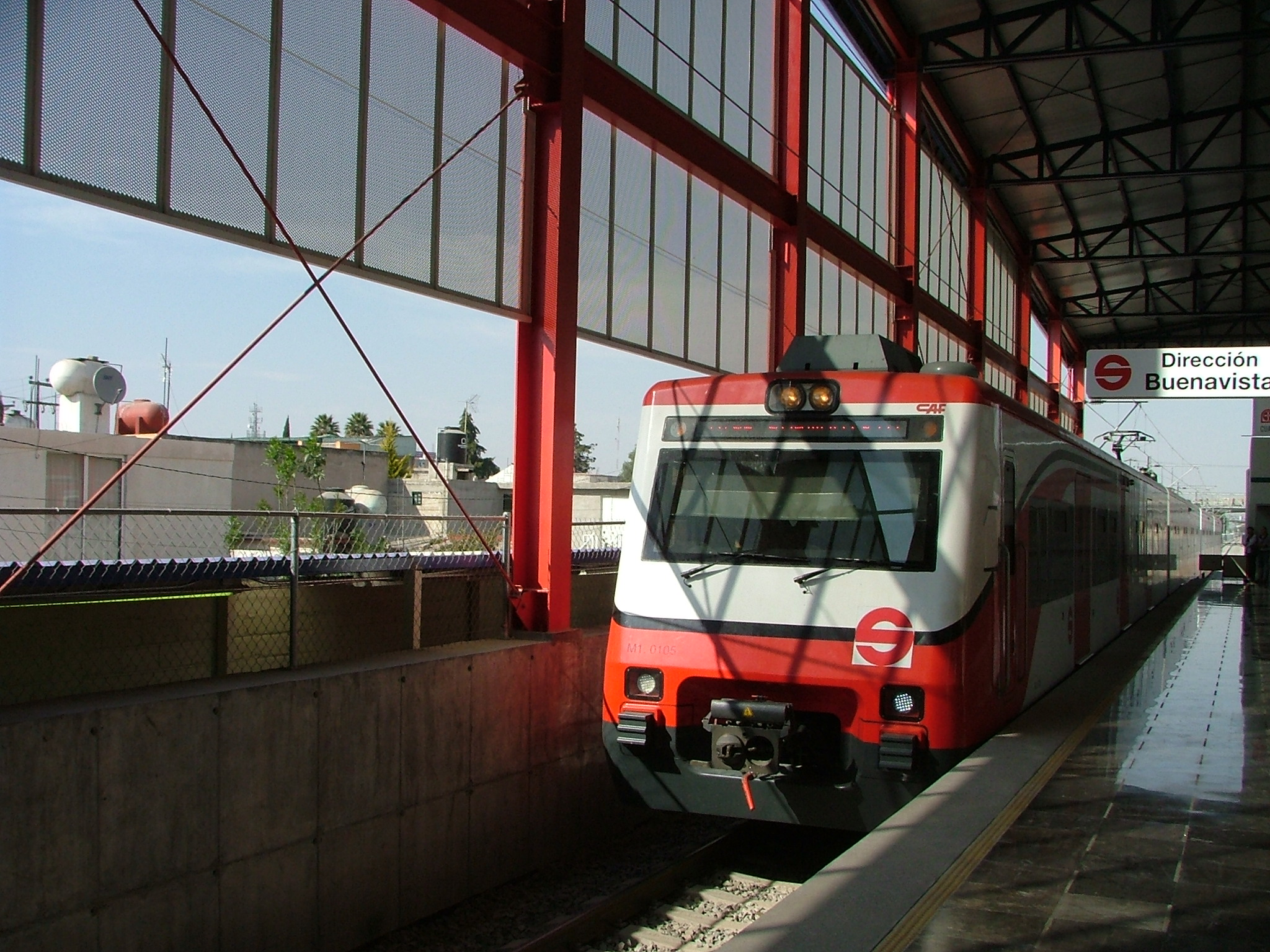
Tren Suburbano

==== Tourist lines ====
- Chihuahua al Pacífico, a tourist train running through the Copper Canyon.
- Tequila Express, a tourist train running from Guadalajara, Jalisco to a tequila distillery in Amatitán.

==== Railway equipment manufacturers include ====
- Ferrovías del Bajío, which made diesel powered rail cars for the airport shuttle in Pnomh Penh, Cambodia
- Construcciones y Auxiliar de Ferrocarriles in Huehuetoca, which made trains for the LRT Line 1 (Metro Manila).
- Bombardier Transportation México in Ciudad Sahagún

=== Mass transit ===
Urban rail transit systems in Mexico include four light rail or rapid transit systems: The Guadalajara light rail system, the Mexico City Metro, the Mexico City Light Rail line (in Mexico City) and the Monterrey Metro. In 2017, the Puebla–Cholula Tourist Train opened in Puebla City; service ended in December 2021.

== Expansion ==
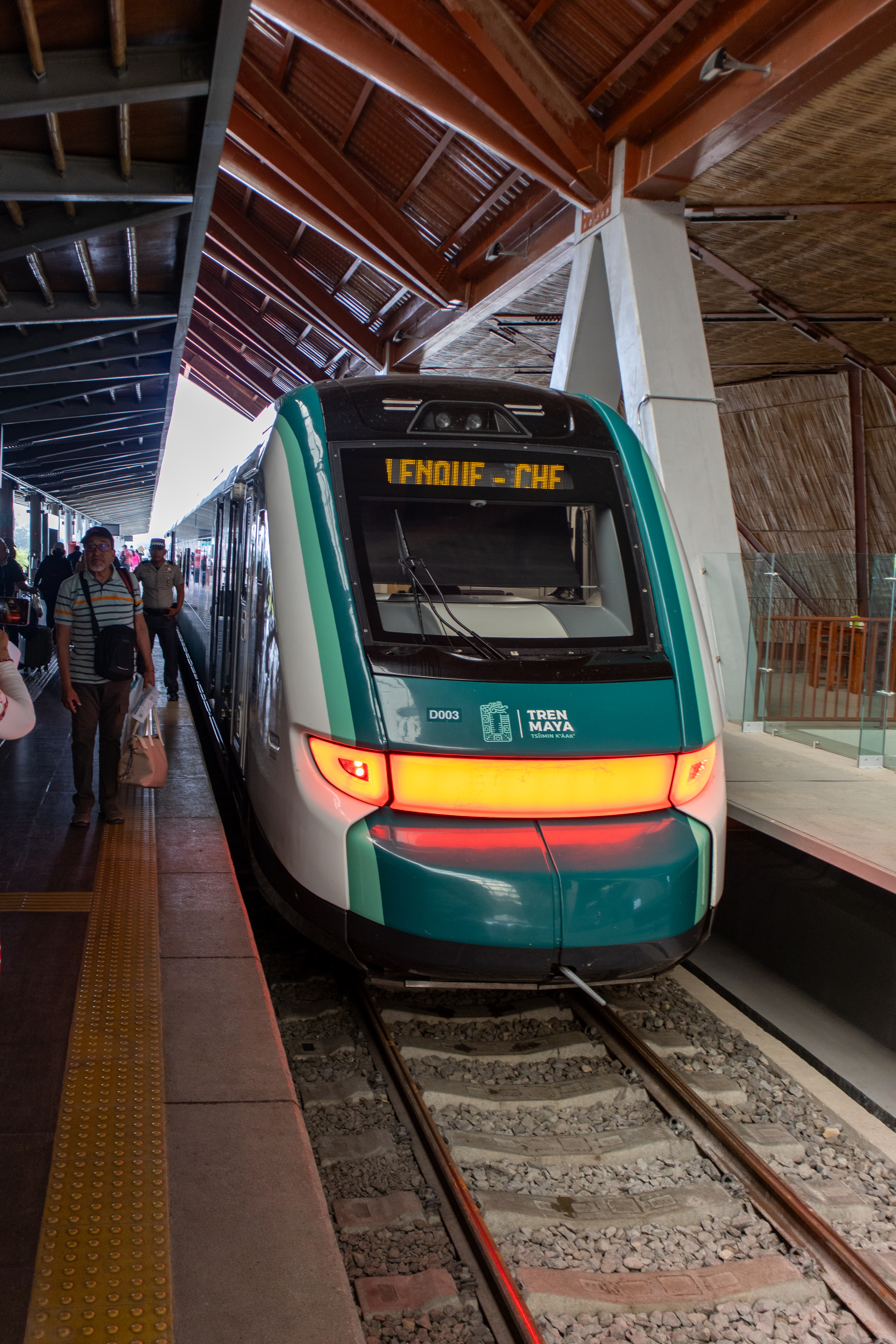
Tren Maya at Palenque

In January 2022, the Mexican Secretary of communications and transport approved a 180 Kilometer rail expansion in the Durango-Mazatlan corridor. It has an estimated cost of 1.2 billion dollars to revive and expand the abandoned corridor under a private-public partnership with the company Caxxor Group, as part of the USMCA agreement.

In 2024, President Claudia Sheinbaum announced plans for the construction of several new passenger rail corridors to be constructed in four phases:

- Phase I
  - Buenavista (Mexico City) – AIFA-Clara Krause (completed, opened in April 2026)
  - Buenavista (Mexico City) – Querétaro (under construction, scheduled to open in 2027)
  - Saltillo – Nuevo Laredo via Monterrey (under construction, scheduled to open in 2027)
  - Querétaro – Irapuato via Celaya (under construction, scheduled to open in 2027)
- Phase II
  - Querétaro – San Luis Potosí
  - Mazatlán – Los Mochis
  - Irapuato – Guadalajara via León
- Phase III
  - Guaymas – Hermosillo
  - Guadalajara – Tepic
  - San Luis Potosí – Saltillo
  - Los Mochis – Guaymas
- Phase IV
  - Tepic – Mazatlán
  - Hermosillo – Nogales

== Museums ==
There are several rail museums in Mexico including the Railway Museum in San Luis Potosi, the Old Railway Station Museum in Aguascalientes, Aguascalientes; a former station along the Interoceanic Railway of Mexico in Cuautla, Morelos which serves as a museum; the Museo de las Ferrocarilles en Yucatán is in Mérida, Yucatán; and the National Railway Museum in Puebla, Puebla. The former station in Monterrey, Nuevo Leon is now used as an art museum.

== Railway links with adjacent countries ==
- United States – freight only – same 1,435 mm (4 ft 8 1/2 in) standard gauge
- Guatemala – at Ciudad Tecún Umán, – break-of-gauge 1,435 mm (4 ft 8 1/2 in) standard gauge / 914 mm (3 ft) (a short section near the international border rebuilt as standard gauge in 2019)

== See also ==
- List of Mexican railroads
- List of street railways in Mexico (all-time, historical list)
- Transportation in Mexico
