= El Espinal, Oaxaca =

El Espinal
- Municipality and town
- Location in Mexico
- Coordinates: 16°29′26″N 95°02′40″W
- Country: Mexico
- State: Oaxaca

Area
  - Total: 82.93 km^{2} (32.02 sq mi)

Population (2005)
  - Total: 8,219
- Time zone: UTC-6 (Central Standard Time)

El Espinal, Spanish for "the spine" is a town and municipality in Oaxaca, southeastern Mexico. As of 2005, the municipality had a population of 8,219.

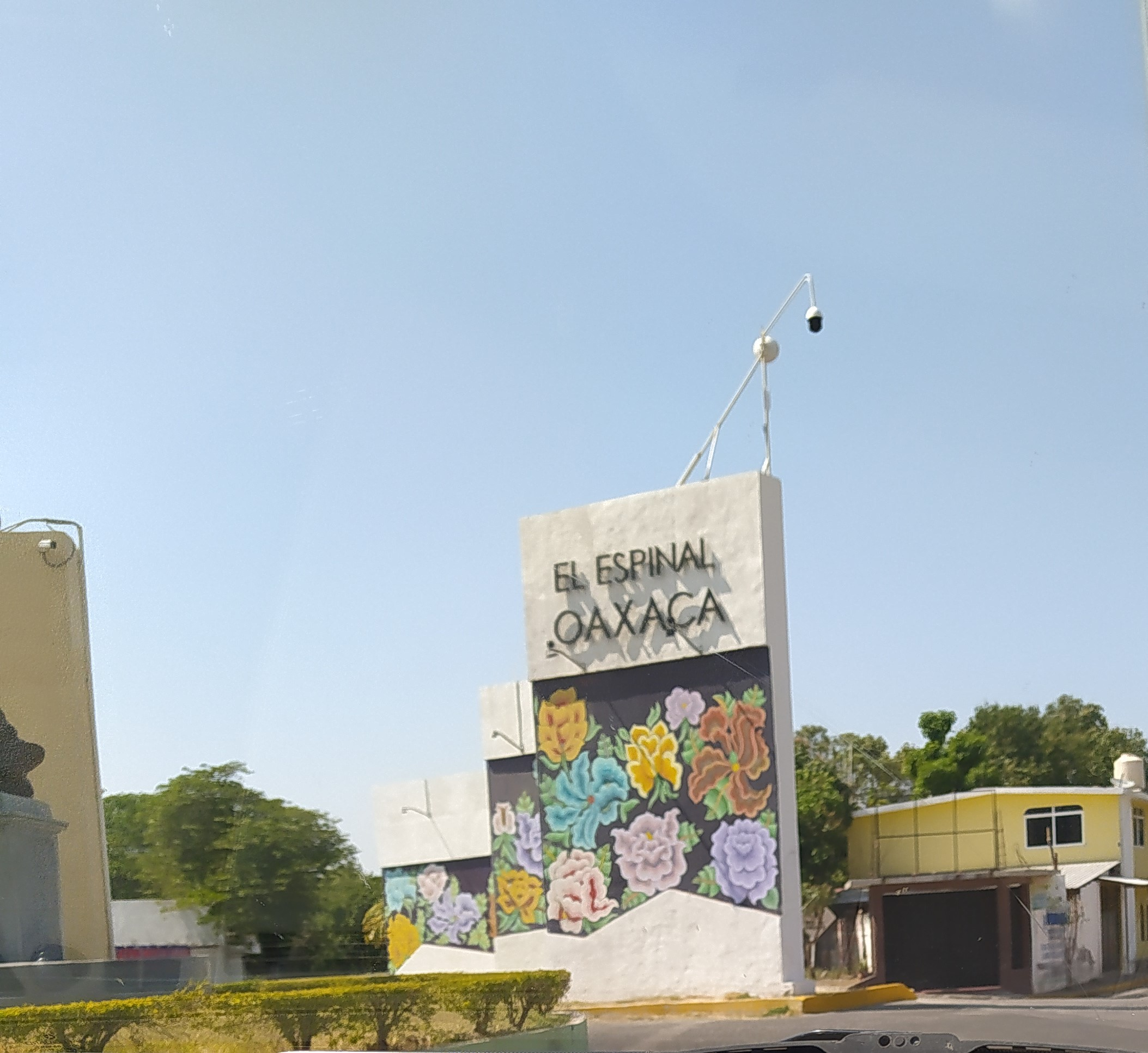
Entrada principal del Espinal, Oaxaca.

== Geography ==
Covering an area of 82.93 km^{2}, El Espinal is part of the Juchitán District in the west of the Istmo de Tehuantepec region. The area is a plain, ideal for agriculture, with a very warm and somewhat humid climate. It shares boundaries with Asunción Ixtaltepec to the north, Comitancillo and San Pedro Comitancillo to the west, and Juchitán de Zaragoza to the south.

== History ==
El Espinal was recognized as a town in 1808, just before Mexican Independence. This zone did not play an important role during the toughest years of the struggle for the independence of Mexico. Non of the important movements towards independence started here. Nor any of the important personalities that fought for independence was originally from this municipality. El Espinal remained isolated from national events that took place elsewhere.

== Infrastructure ==
In terms of education, the municipality has one kindergarten, four grammar schools, two middle schools, and one high school. Additionally, there is one computer lab and a small English school. Health care is limited, with only one center providing basic services and first aid.

Sports play an important role in El Espinal, with young people frequently using the local facilities. These include two small soccer fields, two basketball courts, and a running track. The most prominent facility is the baseball field, as many well-known Mexican baseball professionals come from this municipality.

In regard to population and according to a local source from 2005, there are about 2,172 houses from which 2,115 are owned by the population.

=== Transportation ===
On November 21, 2025, the railway station at El Espinal was reopened. It is currently served by Line K of Tren Interoceánico.

Preceding station	Tren Interoceánico	Following station
Ixtepec toward Salina Cruz	Line K	Juchitán toward Tonalá
Ixtepec toward Salina Cruz	Tehuanito South	Juchitán toward Unión Hidalgo

== Gastronomy ==
Traditional foods in El Espinal include the black mole, stewed beef, jerked beef, tamales, marquesote, garnachas, corn tamales, chiles stuffed with different types of meat and seafood.
