= Mapastepec railway station =

Proposed railway station in Mapastepec, Chiapas

Coordinates: 15°26′03″N 92°54′07″W

Mapastepec

General information
- Location: Mapastepec, Chiapas, Mexico
- Platforms: 1
- Tracks: 2

History
- Opened: 1908 (originally); Mid-2025 (planned reopening)

Future services
Preceding station	Tren Interoceánico	Following station
Pijijiapan toward Salina Cruz	Line K extension	Acapetahua toward Ciudad Hidalgo
Location

Mapastepec is a former and future railway station in Mapastepec, Chiapas, Mexico.

== History ==
The station was established on the Ferrocarril Panamericano, which, since 1908, connected the Ferrocarril Transístmico with towns on the coast of Chiapas (including the region of Soconusco), as well as the Guatemala–Mexico border.

In 1911, the Departments of Tonalá and Soconusco, located in southern Chiapas, were connected by train with the rest of the country, thereby benefiting the region.
