= Chahuites =

- Municipality and town
- Location in Mexico
- Coordinates: 16°17′N 94°12′W
- Country: Mexico
- State: Oaxaca

Area
  - Total: 160.75 km^{2} (62.07 sq mi)

Population (2005)
  - Total: 9,929
- Time zone: UTC-6 (Central Standard Time)

Chahuites is a town and municipality in Oaxaca in south-eastern Mexico. The municipality covers an area of 160.75 km^{2}. It is part of the Juchitán District in the west of the Istmo de Tehuantepec region

As of 2005, the municipality had a total population of 9,929.

Chahuites is nowadays among the most important mango producers in Mexico. Its production is mainly exported to United States of America, Canada and Europe.

== History ==
The history of Chahuites goes back to 1895, when the Román Ramírez and Gamboa families choose this region to establish their homes. They built with palm and wood on a high piece of land surrounded by vegetation. While living in this region, the first settlers were surprised by the discovery of dens of mouse-like animals known as tuza, because of this discovery the settlers decided to name the place "El Tuzal". Over time more settlers like the Zacarías brothers and Juvencio Fuentes arrived in the region.

That was how life in the region developed until 1905 when General Porfirio Díaz, president of Mexico, developed the infrastructure of the region and its official district Tapanatepec. This project drastically changed life in El Tuzal since many people working on the new infrastructure decided to settle there too. The region grew because the villagers obtained good crops in both the rainy season and in the dry season. That is why the name of the region was changed to Chahuites, which means wet ground. As the region continued its development, the settlers began the process required to become an independent municipality instead of being part of Tapanatepec. In 1948 the Chahuites finally became independent.

Leobardo Ramos Lázaro, municipal president, was shot to death on February 4, 2021, four days after being accused of embezzling town funds.

== Transportation ==
Tren Interoceánico operates a station for its Line K in Chahuites. On November 21, 2025, the station was reopened for passenger service.

Services
Preceding station	Tren Interoceánico	Following station
Unión Hidalgo toward Salina Cruz	Line K	Arriaga toward Tonalá
Reforma Future station toward Salina Cruz	Line K	Arriaga toward Tonalá
