= Reforma railway station =

Railway station in Oaxaca, Mexico

Coordinates: 16°24′08″N 94°27′14″W

Reforma

General information
- Location: Reforma de Pineda, Oaxaca, Mexico
- Platforms: 1
- Tracks: 1

History
- Opened: 1904 (originally); 2025 (planned reopening)

Future services
Preceding station	Tren Interoceánico	Following station
Unión Hidalgo toward Salina Cruz	Line K extension	Chahuites toward Ciudad Hidalgo
Location

Reforma is a former and future train station located in Reforma de Pineda, Oaxaca.

== History ==
The station was built on the Picacho-Suchiate line of the old Ferrocarril Panamericano. The construction of this station was authorized on 28 August 1901 through concession number 237, which was promulgated by the federal government of Mexico on 11 September of the same year. Starting in 1908, this line connected the state of Chiapas with the border of Guatemala.
