= Chivela railway station =

Railway station in Oaxaca, Mexico

Coordinates: 16.7132°N 95.0011°W

Chivela

General information
- Location: Chivela, Oaxaca, Mexico
- Platforms: 1
- Tracks: 5

History
- Opened: December 22, 2023

Services
Preceding station	Tren Interoceánico	Following station
Ixtepec toward Salina Cruz	Line Z	Matías Romero toward Coatzacoalcos
Future services
Nizandá toward Ixtepec	Tehuanito North	Lagunas toward Ubero
Location

Chivela is a train station in Chivela, Asunción Ixtaltepec, Oaxaca.

In 2019 a freight train derailed near the station. Later, the station was completely remodeled as part of the renovation of Line Z. Although the station is reportedly incomplete, it was announced that the station reopened on December 22, 2023.
