= Juchitán railway station =

Proposed railway station in Juchitán de Zaragoza, Oaxaca

Coordinates: 16.4366°N 95.0145°W

Juchitán

General information
- Location: Juchitán de Zaragoza, Oaxaca, Mexico
- Platforms: 1
- Tracks: 1

History
- Opened: 1904 (originally); November 21, 2025 (reopening)
- Closed: 1999 (originally)

Services
| Preceding station | Tren Interoceánico | Following station |
|---|---|---|
| El Espinal toward Salina Cruz | Line K | Unión Hidalgo toward Tonalá |
| El Espinal toward Salina Cruz | Tehuanito South | Unión Hidalgo Terminus |
Location

Juchitán railway station is a train station in Juchitán de Zaragoza, Oaxaca.

== History ==
The station was built on the Ferrocarril Panamericano, a line that, since 1908, connected the towns on the coast of Chiapas and Soconusco. The line also connects the Ferrocarril Transístmico with Guatemala. On 1 November 1904, the 192-kilometer stretch from San Jerónimo to Polka, passing through Juchitán, was inaugurated.

In 1999, passenger service at the station stopped. During the sexenio of Governor José Murat Casab, the station became the Guadalupe Hinojosa de Murat Public Library. However, the 8.2 magnitude earthquake on 7 September 2017 caused damage. The building was recovered with the participation of the Alfredo Harp Helú Foundation and a year later, the Juchitán city council decided to rename the station in honor of José F. Gómez, as it is currently known.

On November 21, 2025, the station was officially reopened.
