= Pijijiapan railway station =

Proposed railway station in Pijijiapan, Chiapas

Coordinates: 15.6857°N 93.2075°W

Pijijiapan

General information
- Location: Pijijiapan, Chiapas, Mexico
- Platforms: 1
- Tracks: 2

History
- Opened: 1906 (originally); Mid-2025 (planned reopening)

Future services
Preceding station	Tren Interoceánico	Following station
Tonalá toward Salina Cruz	Line K extension	Mapastepec toward Ciudad Hidalgo
Location

Pijijiapan is a former and future railway station in Pijijiapan, Chiapas.

== History ==
The railway arrived at Pijijiapan on 8 March 1906, when it became a station on the Ferrocarril Panamericano. Since 1908, this line connected the Ferrocarril Transístmico with towns on the coast of Chiapas (including the region of Soconusco), as well as the Guatemala-Mexico border.
