= Ixtepec railway station =

Railway station

Coordinates: 16.5547°N 95.0941°W

Ixtepec

General information
- Location: Ixtepec, Oaxaca, Mexico
- Platforms: 2
- Tracks: 5

History
- Opened: 1894 (originally); 22 December 2023 (reopening)
- Closed: 2000 (originally)

Services
Preceding station	Tren Interoceánico	Following station
Salina Cruz Terminus	Line Z	Chivela toward Coatzacoalcos
Comitancillo toward Salina Cruz	Line K (Note: Previous major station: Tehuantepec)	El Espinal toward Tonalá
Comitancillo toward Salina Cruz	Tehuanito South	El Espinal toward Unión Hidalgo
Former services
Preceding station	N de M	Following station
El Guichibé toward Salina Cruz	Ferrocarril Transístmico	Empalme Distrito Arriaga toward Coatzacoalcos
Terminus	Ixtepec-Ciudad Hidalgo Line	Ixtaltepec toward Ciudad Hidalgo
Future services
Preceding station	Tren Interoceánico	Following station
Terminus	Tehuanito North	Nizandá toward Ubero
Location

Ixtepec is a train station located in Ciudad Ixtepec, Oaxaca.

== History ==
The first station in Ixtepec was opened in 1894, alongside the rest of the Ferrocarril Transístmico.

At the beginning of the year 2000, passenger train service to Ixtepec stopped. However, migrants from Central America continued to board freight trains in the city.

On December 22, 2023, the station reopened for passenger service.
