= Arriaga Municipality =

Municipality in the Mexican state of Chiapas

- Municipality
- Coat of arms

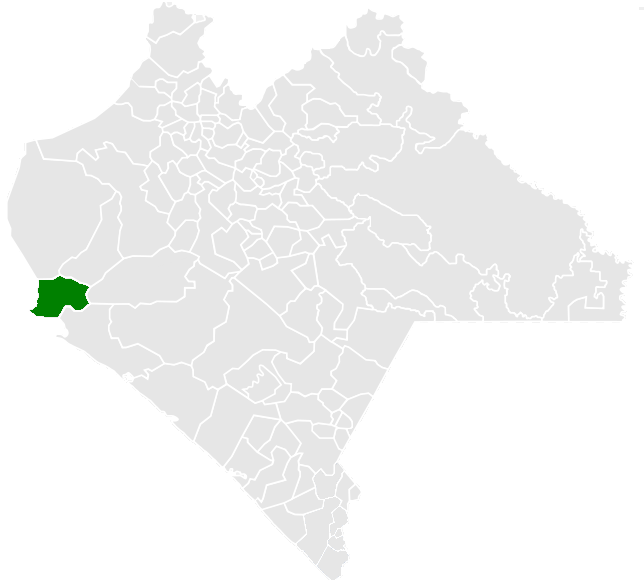
- Municipality of Arriaga in Chiapas

- Location in Mexico
- Coordinates: 16°14′6″N 93°53′44″W
- Country: Mexico
- State: Chiapas

Area
  - Total: 653.3 km^{2} (252.2 sq mi)
- Elevation: 60 m (200 ft)

Population (2010)
  - Total: 40,042
- Climate: Aw

Arriaga Municipality is a municipality in the Mexican state of Chiapas, in southern Mexico. It covers an area of 653.3 km^{2} (252.2 sq mi) and is bordered by the Pacific Ocean and the neighbouring state of Oaxaca, as well as by the Chiapas municipalities of Cintalapa, Jiquipilas, Villaflores and Tonalá.

As of 2010, the municipality had a total population of 40,042, up from 34,032 in 2005.

As of 2010, the city of Arriaga had a population of 24,447. Other than the city of Arriaga, the municipality had 464 localities, the largest of which (with 2010 populations in parentheses) were: Emiliano Zapata (3,353), classified as urban, and Azteca (La Punta) (1,829), La Gloria (1,801), La Línea (1,452), and Lázaro Cárdenas (1,172), classified as rural.

The name of the city honours Ponciano Arriaga, the name given to it upon creation of the municipality on 28 May 1910. It was given city status on 1 December 1943.

== Transportation ==
Tren Interoceánico has a station on its Line K in Arriaga. On November 21, 2025, the station was reopened for passenger service.

Current services
Preceding station	Tren Interoceánico	Following station
Chahuites toward Salina Cruz	Line K	Tonalá Terminus
