= Juchitán =

Juchitán may refer to:

- Juchitán, Guerrero, Mexico
- Juchitán District
  - Juchitán, Oaxaca, Mexico ("Juchitán de Zaragoza")
  - Juchitán railway station
