= El Tehuanito =

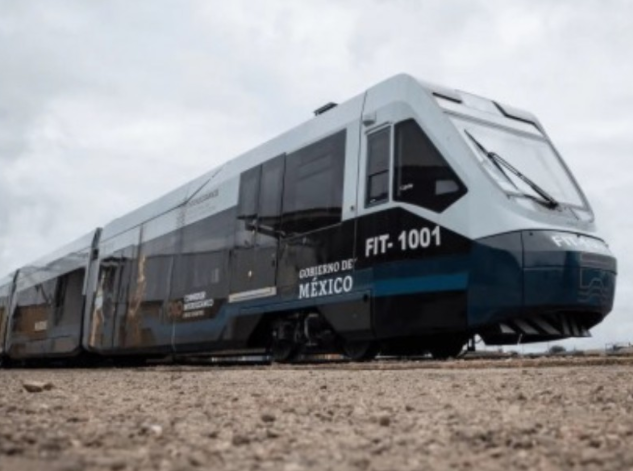
- A Stadler Citylink used as rolling stock for El Tehuanito

Overview
- Owner: Secretariat of the Navy
- Area served: Oaxaca
- Locale: Isthmus of Tehuantepec
- Transit type: Commuter rail
- Number of lines: 2
- Number of stations: 7
- Website: www.pasajerosinteroceanico.com.mx

Operation
- Began operation: 15 December 2025; 11 months ago (Sur)
- Operator: Ferrocarril del Istmo de Tehuantepec
- Rolling stock: Stadler Citylink

Technical
- Track gauge: 1,435 mm (4 ft 8 1/2 in) standard gauge

El Tehuanito is a commuter rail network that began operations on December 15, 2025 as part of Tren Interoceánico system.

Its goal is to provide an efficient and accessible transportation service for low-income communities in the Isthmus of Tehuantepec in Oaxaca, with routes running Monday through Friday that cover a total of 189 kilometres (117 mi).

== Lines ==
Tehuanito North (Spanish: Tehuanito Norte):

- Route: Ubero - Donají - Sarabia - Mogoñé - Matías Romero - Lagunas - Chívela - Nizandá - Ixtepec.
- Connections: Tehuanito Sur at Ixtepec; and Line Z.

Tehuanito South (Spanish: Tehuanito Sur):

- Route: Salina Cruz - Tehuantepec - Comitancillo - Ixtepec - El Espinal - Juchitán - Unión Hidalgo.
- Connections: Tehuanito Norte at Ixtepec; Line K and Line Z.

== Background ==
Within the framework of the rehabilitation of the CIIT tracks (which includes lines for cargo and passengers such as Line Z, FA and K), the "El Tehuanito" train project arises as a suburban train focused on improving daily mobility and the quality of life of the inhabitants of the Oaxacan Isthmus. Its objective is to offer an efficient and low-cost passenger service between the main urban areas of the region, complementing the long-distance and cargo service in the State of Oaxaca.

== See also ==
- Tren Interoceánico
- Line Z (Tren Interoceánico)
- Line K (Tren Interoceánico)
