= Martha Izquierdo =

Mexican social media personality and journalist

- Born: 1972 (age 52–53); Veracruz, Mexico

TikTok information
- Page: marthaizquierdooficial
- Followers: 810.7 thousand

Martha Izquierdo is a Mexican social media personality and journalist based in Ixtepec. As of 2021, she has 700,000 followers on the social media platform TikTok.

== Early life and education ==
Izquierdo was born in Veracruz to an accountant father and a homemaker mother. Her parents divorced, and Izquierdo went to live with extended family in Oaxaca, where she was sexually abused by her uncle.

From a young age, she wanted to become a journalist.

== Career in journalism ==
After high school, Izquierdo returned to Veracruz to study journalism. She went on to become a national correspondent for the Mexican daily Reforma.

In 2007, when Izquierdo went to cover the accidental murder of three newspaper sellers by the Los Zetas cartel, she received death threats via a phone call. She fled to Mexico City. Similarly, in 2013 she was detained by armed men while covering a local conflict, but was released without injury.

She continues to receive threats and violent actions due to her journalism.

As of 2021, Izquierdo works at a local radio station in Oaxaca.

== Online presence ==
Izquierdo started a TikTok account in 2020.

== Personal life ==
In 2015, she was diagnosed with ovarian cancer and given a prognosis of eight months. However, after undergoing chemotherapy and surgeries, she went into remission. She was diagnosed with stomach cancer in 2017. That year she also experienced two heart attacks.

Izquierdo is currently based in Ixtepec, Oaxaca.
