= Unión Hidalgo railway station =

Railway station in Oaxaca, Mexico

Coordinates: 16.4692°N 94.8292°W

Unión Hidalgo

General information
- Location: Unión Hidalgo, Oaxaca, Mexico
- Platforms: 2
- Tracks: 2

History
- Opened: 1904 (originally); November 21, 2025 (reopening)
- Rebuilt: 2023-2024

Services
| Preceding station | Tren Interoceánico | Following station |
|---|---|---|
| Juchitán toward Salina Cruz | Line K | Chahuites (Note: In the future, the next station on Line K will be Reforma) toward Tonalá |
| Juchitán toward Salina Cruz | Tehuanito South | Terminus |
Location

Unión Hidalgo is a train station in Unión Hidalgo, Oaxaca, Mexico.

== History ==
The station was built on the Ferrocarril Panamericano, a line that, since 1908, connected the towns on the coast of Chiapas and Soconusco. The line also connects the Ferrocarril Transístmico with Guatemala. On 1 November 1904, the 192-kilometer stretch from San Jerónimo to Polka, passing through Unión Hidalgo, was inaugurated.

In 2020, the original station was demolished because of the danger of it collapsing, due to the earthquakes that hit the community recently. However, in 2023, as part of the rehabilitation of the Ixtepec-Ciudad Hidalgo Line, the rebuilding of the station began.

On November 21, 2025, the station was reopened for passenger service.
