= Reforma de Pineda =

- Municipality and town
- Location in Mexico
- Coordinates: 16°24′N 94°27′W
- Country: Mexico
- State: Oaxaca

Area
  - Total: 193.92 km^{2} (74.87 sq mi)

Population (2005)
  - Total: 2,691
- Time zone: UTC-6 (Central Standard Time)

Reforma de Pineda is a town and municipality in Oaxaca in south-western Mexico. The municipality covers an area of 193.92 km^{2}. It is part of the Juchitán District in the west of the Istmo de Tehuantepec region.

As of 2005, the municipality had a total population of 2,691.
