= Ferrocarriles Chiapas-Mayab =

Former Mexican state-owned railroad

Compañía de Ferrocarriles Chiapas-Mayab S.A. de C.V.
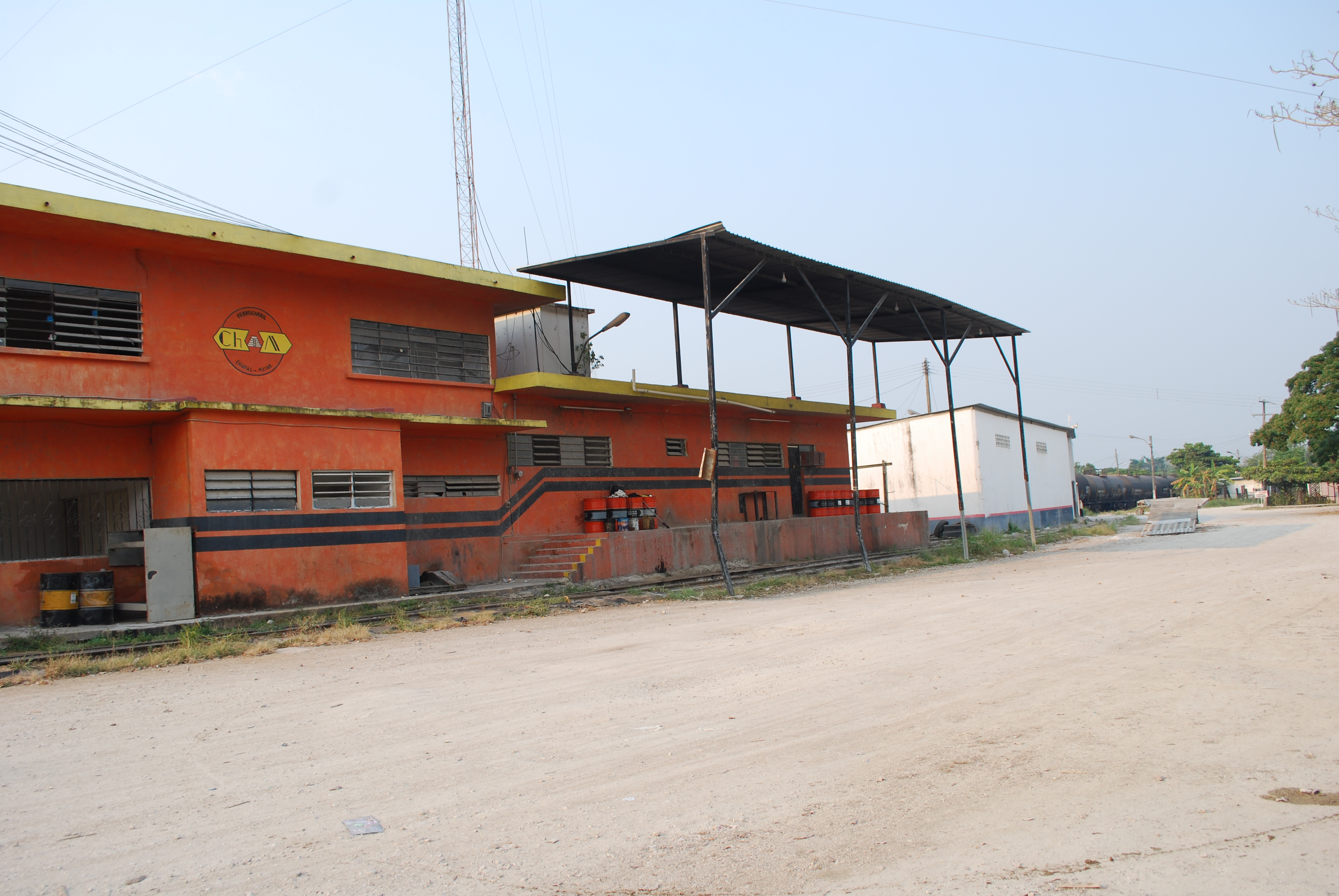
- The former FFCM station in Palenque, Chiapas as seen on 16 April 2011

Overview
- Concessions: Genesee & Wyoming (1999–2007); Viabilis Holding (2013–2016); Secretariat of Communications and Transportation (2016–2018)
- Main regions: Chiapas; Yucatán; Veracruz
- Headquarters: Mérida, Yucatán
- Reporting mark: FCCM
- Locale: Southeastern Mexico; Yucatán Peninsula
- Dates of operation: 1999–2018
- Successor: Ferrocarril del Istmo de Tehuantepec (Note: Operations were taken over by Ferrocarril del Istmo de Tehuantepec from 2008 to 2013, and again in 2018.)

Technical
- Track gauge: 1,435 mm (4 ft 8 1/2 in) standard gauge
- No. of tracks: 1

Ferrocarriles Chiapas-Mayab (reporting mark FCCM) was a state-owned railroad company in southeastern Mexico. It was operated by a consortium led by Genesee & Wyoming and was later taken over by the Secretariat of Communications and Transportation after the concession was relinquished in 2007. Parts of its railway network became associated with La Bestia ('The Beast'), a term used for freight trains that many Central American migrants rode from Tapachula northward through Mexico in attempts to reach and cross the Mexico–United States border.

== History ==
Ferrocarriles Chiapas-Mayab became a subsidiary of the Genesee & Wyoming on August 26, 1999 with a 30-year concession to operate the railroad. The railroad was damaged by Hurricane Stan in October 2005. The hurricane damaged over 175 miles (282 km) of track and Genesee & Wyoming was not financially capable to repair the railroad. On 25 June 2007, Genesee & Wyoming Inc announced it was giving up its 30-year concession and liquidating FCCM S.A. by the end of 2007. As a result, Ferrosur operates on the Yucatan Peninsula from Coatzacoalcos. Later, Ferrocarriles Chiapas-Mayab was officially taken over by Ferrocarril del Istmo de Tehuantepec in 2008. Through Ferrocarril del Istmo de Tehuantepec, the government invested approximately 1.2 billion pesos in track rehabilitation between 2007 and 2013. It is also implementing a plan from 2014 to 2018 with a budget of 6 billion pesos. In 2012, Secretary of Communications and Transportation amended the railway concession in order to keep the railways under government control while allowing any potential investor to operate the cargo operations. By 2013, The Secretary of Communications and Transportation announced it had given the new amended concession to Viabilis Holdings to continue operations of Ferrocarriles Chiapas-Mayab for a period of 30–50 years.

In September 2014, the Secretary of Telecommunications and Transportation announced that the federal government was going to invest 6 billion pesos to rehabilitate the railway in part to deter Central American Immigrants from hitch-hiking on the train, as well as to increase rail cargo speed in the region.

By 2016, The Secretary of Communications and Transportation (SCT) grew impatient about the deterioration of the railroad, as well at the migrant crises in which Central American migrants were riding on top of the trains. On August 23, The Secretary of Communications and Transportation revoked the concession to Viabilis Holdings. Citing that, "For reasons of interest, public utility and national security" as the reason it was revoking the concession. Viabilis Holdings was given 60 days to remove and dispose of property, equipment and facilities owned off the railway.

One of the shareholders in Ferrocarriles Chiapas Mayab, Pedro Topete Vargas, denounced the revocation of its concession as, "an act of revenge" from Secretary of Communications and Transportation Ruiz Esparza. Due to litigation of his other company, Infraiber, towards SCT favorite OHL, which Vargas has accused of corruption and favoritism.

In 2018, the operation of Ferrocarriles Chiapas-Mayab reintegrated with Ferrocarril del Istmo de Tehuantepec.

== Criticism ==
Employees who work for Ferrocarriles Chiapas-Mayab, as well as the SCT, have criticized management for the deterioration and lack of maintenance of railway infrastructure, citing the potential of petrochemical derailment and the loss of life. The Secretary General of the railway union of Yucatán, has criticized Ferrocarriles Chiapas-Mayab for the decline of speed from thirty-five kilometers per hour to ten kilometers per hour. The National Chamber of the transformation industry cited that the railway derails 200 times per year on average.

== Passenger services ==
Ferrocarriles Chiapas-Mayab previously operated passenger services on the Campeche–Tapachula route which began in September 1999, with a 10 million investment to modernize its tracks. The company also explored the establishment of tourist rail cruises in partnership with Ferrosur to increase business profitability focus on showcasing the region's tourist attractions, which include important archaeological sites and the henequen plantations of Yucatán. Parts of this route are now used by Tren Maya.

== See also ==
- Ferrocarriles Unidos del Sureste
- Line K (Tren Interoceánico)
- Tren Maya
- List of Mexican railroads
