= Ixtepec, Oaxaca =

Ciudad Ixtepec
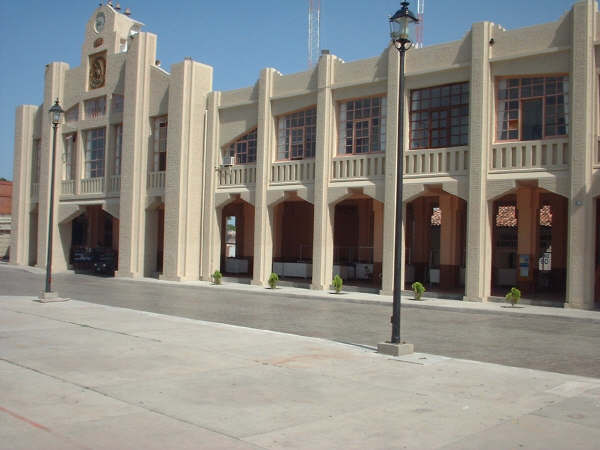
- City Hall

- Location within Oaxaca Location within Mexico
- Coordinates: 16°33′19″N 95°05′48″W
- Country: Mexico
- State: Oaxaca
- Municipality: Ixtepec
- Founded: 16th century

Area
  - Municipality: 294.1 km^{2} (113.6 sq mi)
  - City: 14.48 km^{2} (5.59 sq mi)
- Elevation: 40 m (130 ft)

Population (2020 census)
  - Municipality: 28,082
  - Density: 95.48/km^{2} (247.3/sq mi)
  - City: 26,015
  - City density: 1,797/km^{2} (4,653/sq mi)
- Time zone: UTC-6 (Central)
- Demonym: Ixtepecano

Ixtepec (formally: Ciudad Ixtepec; previously known as Villa de San Jerónimo Doctor) is a small city, and municipality of the same name, located in the state of Oaxaca, in southeastern Mexico. It is part of the Juchitán District in the west of the Istmo de Tehuantepec region.

== History ==
The name "Ixtepec" is derived from Nahuatl and roughly translates to either "view of the mountain" or "face of the mountain."Its name was Iztepeque until 1935, when it was officially changed to Ciudad Ixtepec. The founding of the city was most likely in the 16th century as a Zapotec settlement shortly before the Spanish Conquest. It remained an indigenous community until the 19th century, with its economy based on subsistence farming. In the early 20th century, the community grew in economic importance as its location made it attractive to foreign investment with the building of the Pan-American Highway, originally as a rail line.

== Geography ==
The municipality has an area of 294.1 km^{2} at an average elevation of 40 meters above sea level. The climate is warm, with rainfall of 950 mm annually mostly falling in the summer. Average temperature is 27.4 °C, ranging from 21.5 °C to 30.7 °C.

=== Climate ===
Climate data for Ixtepec (Averages: 1981-2010, Records: 1948-2008)
Month	Jan	Feb	Mar	Apr	May	Jun	Jul	Aug	Sep	Oct	Nov	Dec	Year
Record high °C (°F)	38.0 (100.4)	39.5 (103.1)	41.0 (105.8)	43.0 (109.4)	43.0 (109.4)	41.0 (105.8)	39.5 (103.1)	41.0 (105.8)	39.0 (102.2)	39.0 (102.2)	39.0 (102.2)	39.0 (102.2)	43.0 (109.4)
Mean daily maximum °C (°F)	29.6 (85.3)	30.9 (87.6)	32.7 (90.9)	34.6 (94.3)	35.7 (96.3)	33.7 (92.7)	33.1 (91.6)	33.6 (92.5)	32.4 (90.3)	31.8 (89.2)	31.2 (88.2)	30.0 (86.0)	32.4 (90.3)
Daily mean °C (°F)	25.0 (77.0)	25.9 (78.6)	27.4 (81.3)	29.2 (84.6)	30.3 (86.5)	29.0 (84.2)	28.6 (83.5)	28.9 (84.0)	28.0 (82.4)	27.6 (81.7)	26.9 (80.4)	25.5 (77.9)	27.7 (81.9)
Mean daily minimum °C (°F)	20.4 (68.7)	20.9 (69.6)	22.2 (72.0)	23.8 (74.8)	25.0 (77.0)	24.3 (75.7)	24.1 (75.4)	24.2 (75.6)	23.7 (74.7)	23.5 (74.3)	22.7 (72.9)	21.2 (70.2)	23.0 (73.4)
Record low °C (°F)	9.0 (48.2)	5.3 (41.5)	10.0 (50.0)	13.5 (56.3)	17.0 (62.6)	17.0 (62.6)	15.0 (59.0)	16.0 (60.8)	16.3 (61.3)	15.7 (60.3)	11.0 (51.8)	2.0 (35.6)	2.0 (35.6)
Average precipitation mm (inches)	1.0 (0.04)	2.4 (0.09)	3.5 (0.14)	5.0 (0.20)	44.3 (1.74)	206.6 (8.13)	163.7 (6.44)	178.2 (7.02)	179.3 (7.06)	72.7 (2.86)	16.1 (0.63)	3.1 (0.12)	875.9 (34.48)
Average precipitation days	0.3	0.4	0.6	0.6	3.7	11.5	10.3	10.3	11.6	5.1	1.3	0.2	55.9
Source 1: Servicio Meteorológico National
Source 2: Servicio Meteorológico National

=== Communities ===
As municipal seat, Ciudad Ixtepec has governing authority over the following communities:

- Cheguigo Juárez
- Quinta Sección
- Chivaguí
- Colonia Alejandro Cruz Martínez
- Colonia la Candelaria
- Colonia Niza Luba
- 5 de Febrero
- Llano Blanco
- Imperio Jeromeño
- Piedra Bola
- El Carrizal (Chivaniza)
- El Zapote
- Guichilana
- Guigobazaá
- La Guadalupe
- La Huana Milpería
- La Providencia
- La Rufa
- Laguna Bacuela
- Los Cascabeles
- Los Laureles
- Niza Shiga (Monte Grande)
- Nizandá
- Rancho Félix Enríquez Sangermán
- Río Seco
- Llano Grande
- San Jerónimo

== Economy ==
As of 2005, there were 6,481 households with a population of 24,181, of whom 4,667 spoke an indigenous language. Like Ixtaltepec, Juchitán and Tehuantepec, Ixtepec has a significant native Zapotec population. Many indigenous traditions are still followed.

Ixtepec used to be an important railway center point, but nowadays no passenger train traffic runs through. However, a university has recently been constructed there. Economic activities include very limited agriculture on 972 hectares of irrigated land growing corn, sorghum, sesame and vegetables, 408 small farms raising cattle, pigs or goats, fish hatcheries for crappie, tilapia and red snapper, manufacture of bricks, school uniforms and home furnishings, and mining of black clay for making pots and figurines and adobe bricks.
