= Asunción Ixtaltepec =

- Town and municipality
- Location within Oaxaca Location within Mexico
- Coordinates: 16°30′N 95°3′W
- Country: Mexico
- State: Oaxaca

Government
  - Federal electoral district: Oaxaca's 7th

Area
  - Total: 547.33 km^{2} (211.33 sq mi)
- Elevation: 30 m (98 ft)

Population (2005)
  - Total: 14,438
- Time zone: UTC-6 (Zona Centro)

Asunción Ixtaltepec is a town and municipality in Oaxaca in southern Mexico. It is part of the Juchitán District in the west of the Istmo de Tehuantepec region. The town was founded in 1546. The name means "White Mountain".

== Geography ==
The municipality covers an area of 547.33 km^{2} at an average elevation of 30 meters above sea level. The land is generally flat, with some hills, and is near the upper lagoon. It is bordered by the Los Perros river. The town is about 9 km from the city of Juchitan de Zaragoza, and is connected to the city through a branch of the Pan-American Highway. The Nizanda hot springs are located between the towns of Carrasquedo and Mena (Nizanda) in the municipality. The springs are accessible by a path beside a small river full of water lilies leading through an exuberant forest. The river originates in caves in which the hot springs arise, and has pools for bathing.

== Demography ==
As of 2005, the municipality had 3,936 households with a total population of 14,438 of whom 6,583 spoke an indigenous language.

== Economy ==
Economic activities include cultivation of maize, sorghum, peanuts, beans and sesame, cattle and poultry breeding, and manufacture of handmade textiles, red brick and pottery that are sold throughout the country. In January 2010 the Inter-American Development Bank approved US$102 million in partial financing for two wind facilities in the region, one of which would be in Asunción Ixtaltepec.

== Arts ==
A traditional form of pottery made in the Santa Rita Barrio of Ixtaltepec is the “tinaca de mujer”, a water cooler in the form of a woman made of red clay, about one meter tall or slightly larger. The figure has a bell-shaped skirt and tiny pointed breasts, and carries a shallow bowl of sand on her head in which there is a water jug decorated with lizards and perhaps turtles in low relief. The water is kept cool through evaporation. The local potters also make flower pots, plates and barrel-shaped pots with an open end for frying tortillas.

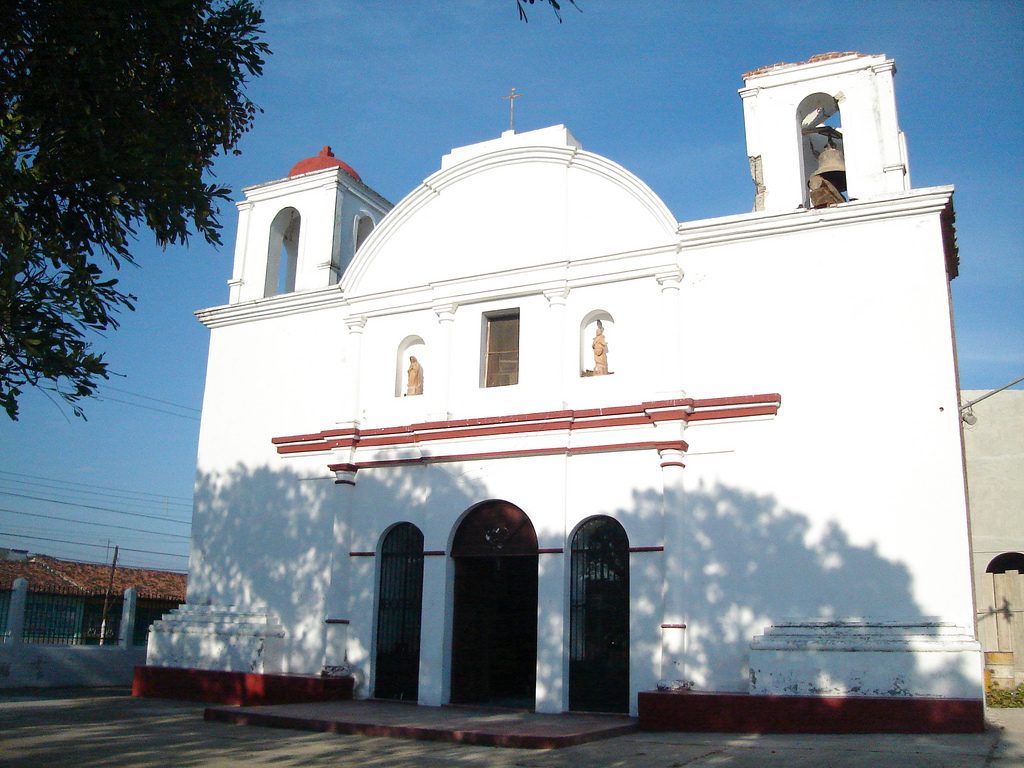
Church of the Virgin of Asunción

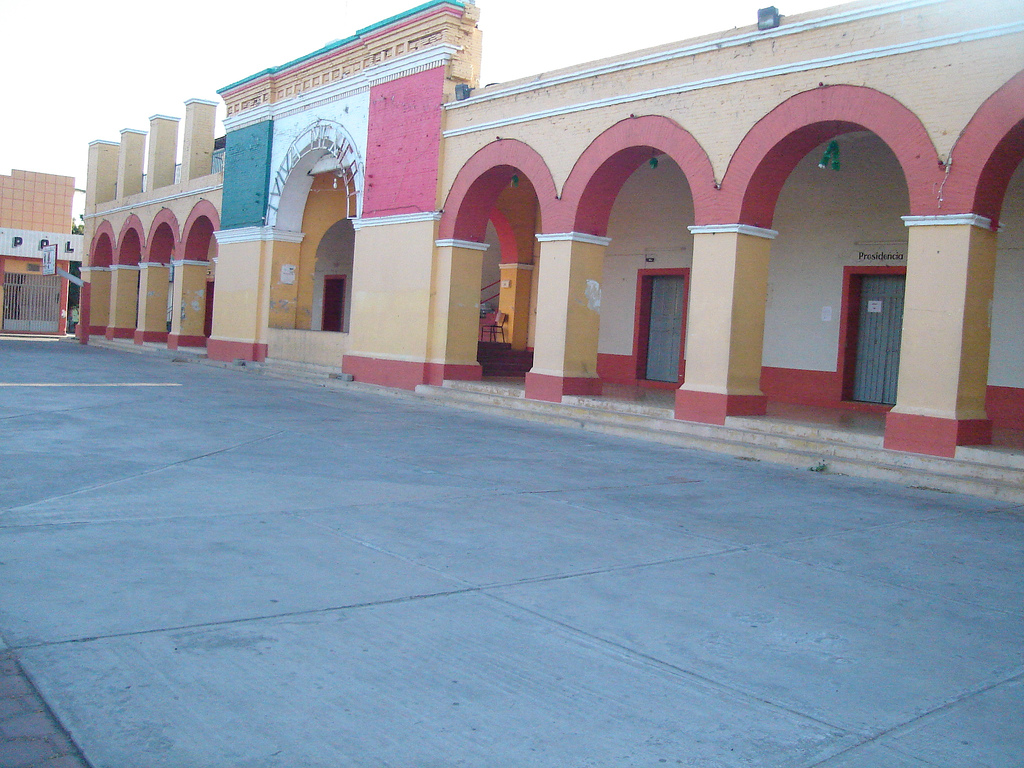
Municipal Palace of Asunción

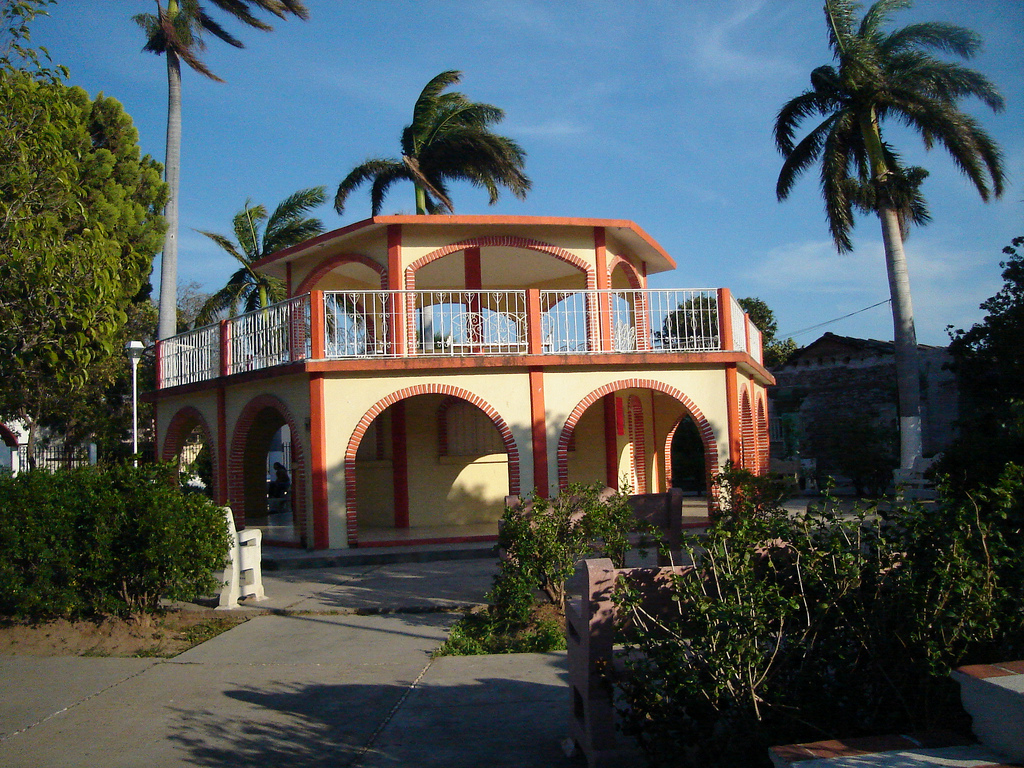
Kiosk in the Jesus Rasgado park, of Asunción

== Airport ==
- Ixtepec Airport
