= Tonalá, Chiapas =

Tonalá
- Municipality
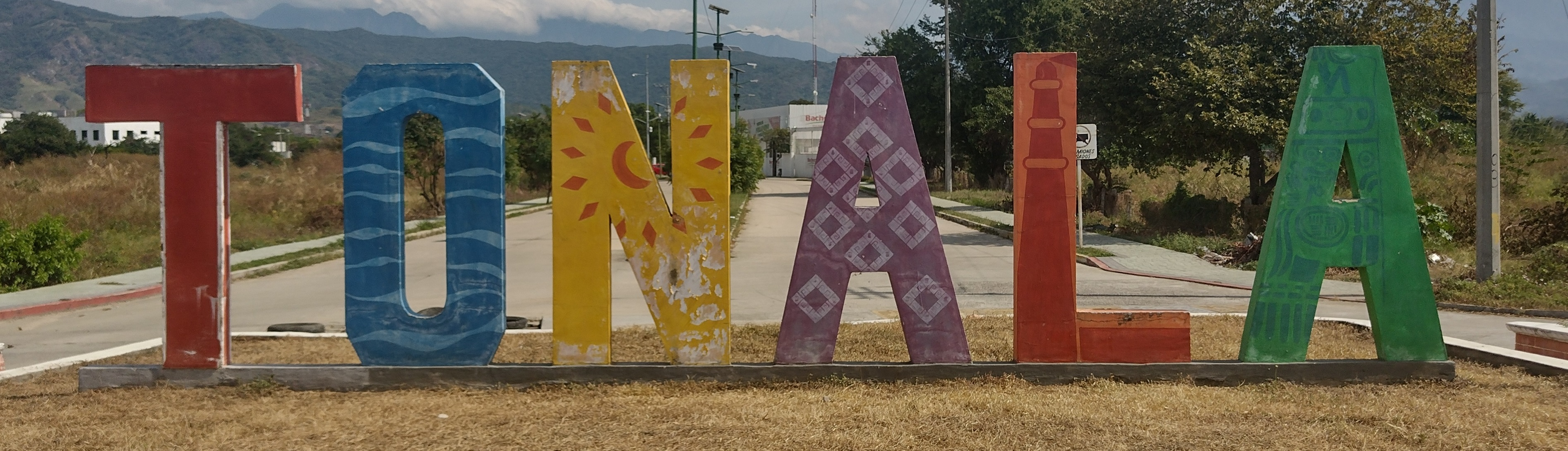

- Municipality of Tonalá in Chiapas

- Location in Mexico
- Coordinates: 16°6′N 93°45′W
- Country: Mexico
- State: Chiapas

Area
  - Total: 715 sq mi (1,853 km^{2})
  - City: 4.23 sq mi (10.95 km^{2})

Population (2020 census)
  - Total: 91,913
  - Density: 128.5/sq mi (49.60/km^{2})
  - City: 38,087
  - City density: 9,009/sq mi (3,478/km^{2})
  - Gender: 45,281 males and 46,632 females

Tonalá is a municipality in the state of Chiapas in southern Mexico.

As of 2010, the municipality had a total population of 84,594, up from 78,438 as of 2005. It covers an area of 1853 km^{2}.

As of 2010, the city of Tonalá had a population of 35,322. Other than the city of Tonalá, the municipality had 960 localities, the largest of which (with 2010 populations in parentheses) were: Paredón (6,126), Tres Picos (4,403), Cabeza de Toro (3,413), classified as urban, and Manuel Ávila Camacho (Ponte Duro) (1,778), Ignacio Ramírez (1,689), Huizachal (1,421), Doctor Belisario Domínguez (La Barra) (1,043), San Luqueño (1,016), and Morelos (Mojarras) (1,010), classified as rural.

== Transportation ==
Tren Interoceánico operates a station for its Line K in Tonalá, which was reopened on November 21, 2025.

Current services
Preceding station	Tren Interoceánico	Following station
Arriaga toward Salina Cruz	Line K	Terminus
Future services (2026)
Arriaga toward Salina Cruz	Line K extension	Pijijiapan toward Ciudad Hidalgo

== See also ==
- Feast of Saint Francis
