= Salina Cruz railway station =

Railway station in Salina Cruz, Oaxaca

Salina Cruz
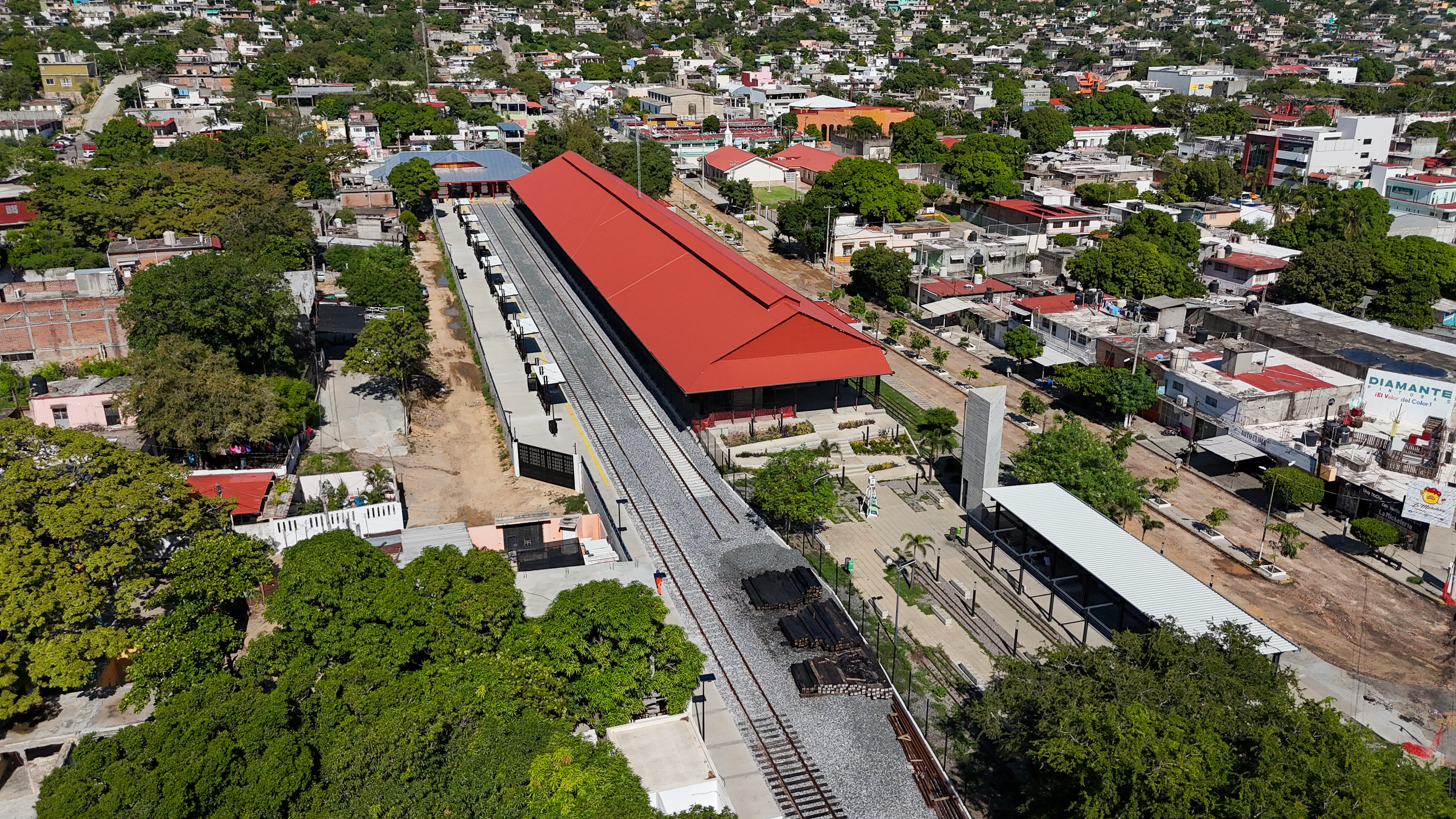
- Aerial view of the station

General information
- Location: Salina Cruz, Oaxaca, Mexico
- Coordinates: 16.18213°N 95.19627°W

History
- Opened: 1907 (originally); 22 December 2023 (reopening)

Services
Preceding station	Tren Interoceánico	Following station
Terminus	Line Z	Ixtepec toward Coatzacoalcos
Terminus	Line K	Tehuantepec toward Tonalá
Terminus	Tehuanito South	Tehuantepec toward Unión Hidalgo
Location

Salina Cruz is a railway station in Salina Cruz, Oaxaca state of Mexico.

== History ==
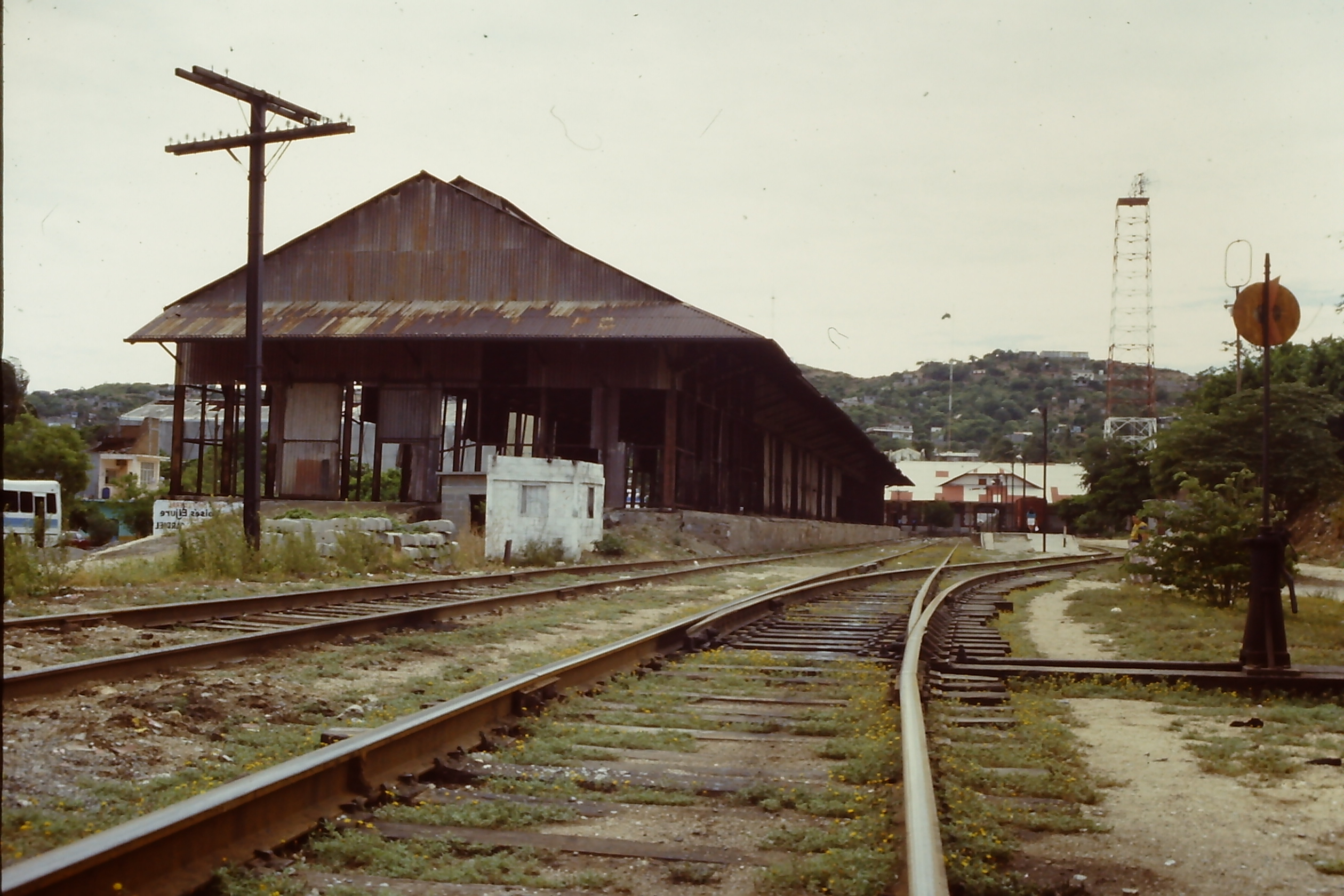
The station as it looked in 1997

The station was built on the Ferrocarril Transístmico. On 19 January 1878, the contract to build the line was made. This contract was approved in June 1879, and on 6 November 1880 the route of the line was fixed.

On 30 May 1882, a decree was issued, authorizing the federal government of Mexico to build a railway across the Isthmus. On 24 July the same year, the resolutions relating to the construction of the line were passed.

On 27 February 1888, the construction of the Ferrocarril Transístmico began. The construction of the railway was completed on 15 October 1894, thereby establishing a railway line that connected the Pacific Ocean with the Atlantic Ocean.

The Salina Cruz station was opened in 1907, when the federal government placed Salina Cruz at the center of progress in the south-southeast of Mexico. Gunpowder, salt and coal were transported through the railway.

=== Renovation ===
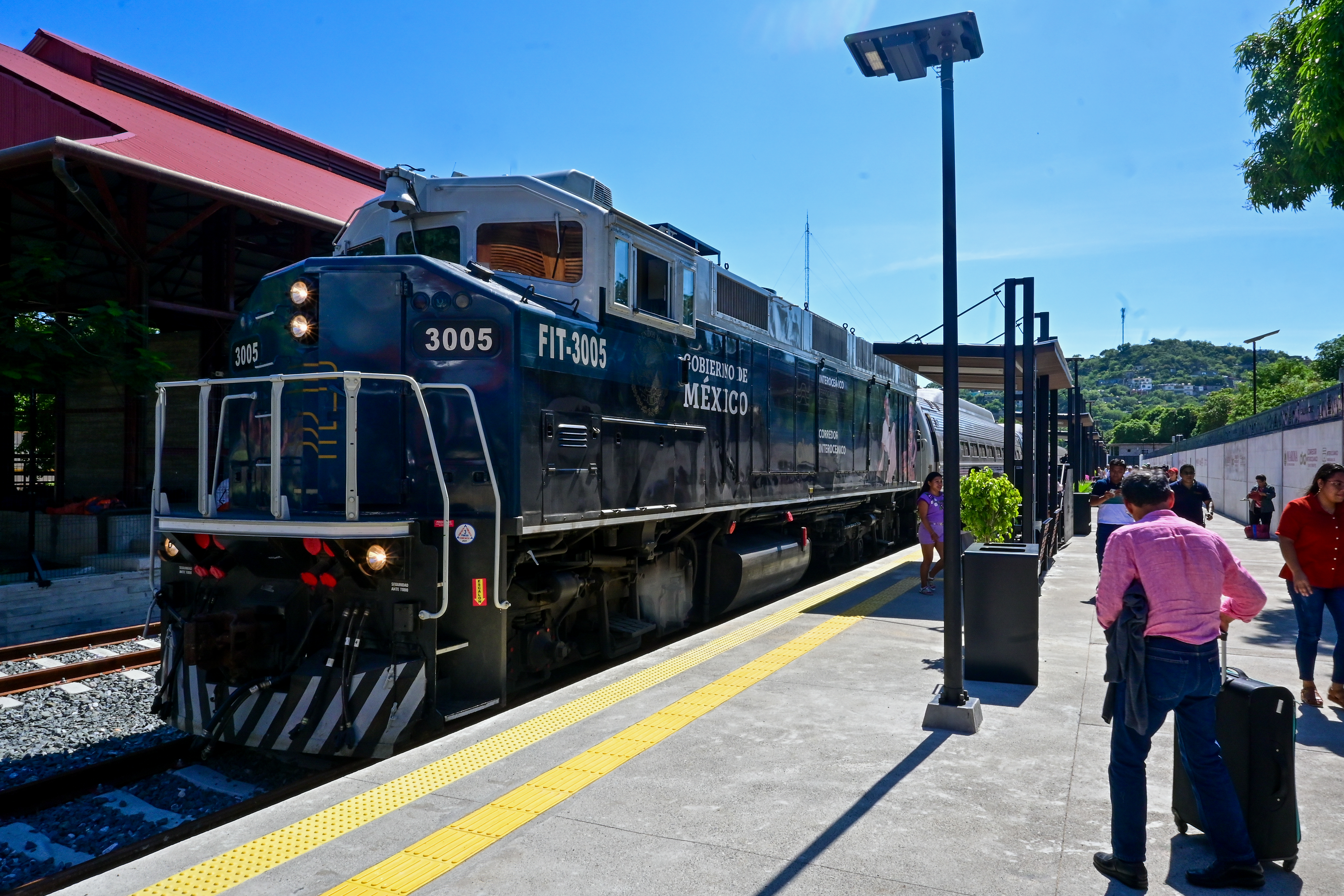
A GMD F59PH locomotive at the station

With an investment of approximately 54 million pesos, construction work is (as of 2023) currently being carried out at the station for what will be the construction of the House of Culture, as part of the "Mi México late" Urban Improvement Program, which carried out by the Secretariat of Agrarian, Land, and Urban Development (SEDATU).

On December 22, 2023, the station reopened, alongside the rest of the line from Salina Cruz to Coatzacoalcos.
