= Line K (Tren Interoceánico) =

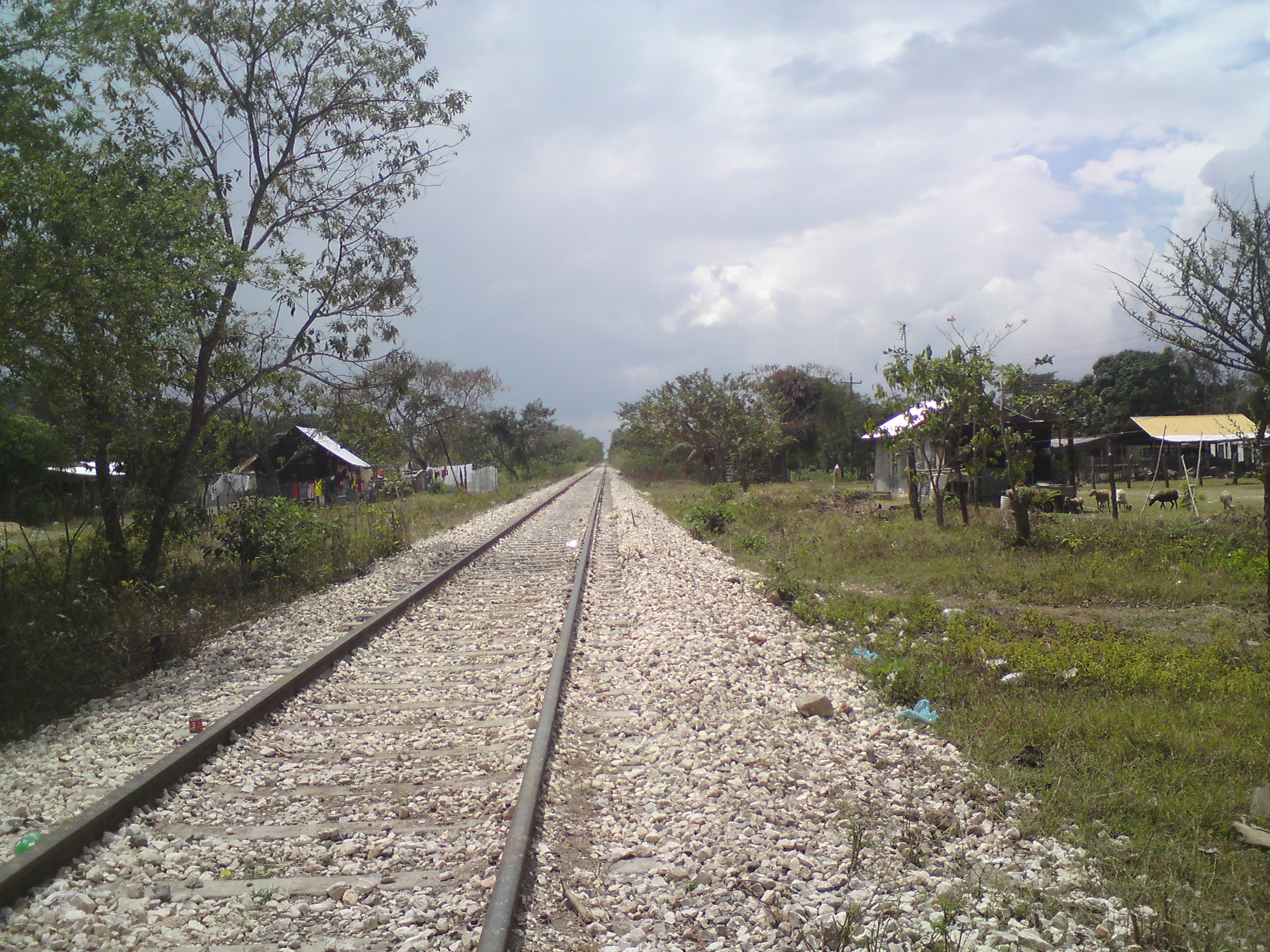
- Line K at El Triunfo, Tabasco (2009)

Overview
- Other name: Ixtepec–Ciudad Hidalgo Line
- Status: Operational (Ixtepec–Tonalá); Under construction (Tonalá–Ciudad Tecún Umán)
- Owner: Federal government of Mexico
- Locale: Southeastern Mexico
- Termini: Ixtepec, Oaxaca; Ciudad Hidalgo, Chiapas
- Stations: 15

Service
- Type: Regional rail; Freight rail
- Operator: Ferrocarril del Istmo de Tehuantepec
- Rolling stock: See rolling stock

History
- Planned opening: 2026/2027 (Tonalá–Ciudad Hidalgo)
- Opened: 21 November 2025 (passenger)

Technical
- Line length: 473 km (294 mi)
- Track gauge: 1,435 mm (4 ft 8 1/2 in) standard gauge

Line K (Spanish: Línea K), also known as the Ixtepec–Ciudad Hidalgo Line, is a railroad owned by the Mexican government that connects Ixtepec, Oaxaca with Ciudad Hidalgo, Chiapas. It was leased to the Ferrocarril Chiapas-Mayab. President Andrés Manuel López Obrador announced that the Mexican government will rehabilitate the line from Ixtepec, Oaxaca to Ciudad Hidalgo, Chiapas.

The line will connect Ixtepec with the Tren Interoceánico. For many years, Central American immigrants took various freight trains from Tapachula to various locations in the United States to cross the Mexico–United States border. However, in 2005, Hurricane Stan destroyed the tracks, and now, the trains started from the city of Arriaga.

== History ==
On its journey through the state of Chiapas, the Ferrocarril Panamericano touched almost all of the municipal capitals on the coast, with the exception of Tuzantán, Escuintla, Mazatán and some of the small capitals bordering Guatemala (Tuxtla Chico, Cacahoatán y Unión Juárez).

=== Rehabilitation ===
In 2023, Secretariat of the Navy (Semar) presented to the Government of Chiapas, Guatemala and other public officials the Rehabilitation Project of the line's tracks, this as part of the Program for the Development of the Isthmus of Tehuantepec in the Multimodal Interoceanic Corridor.

An investment of around 20 billion pesos is expected, as part of the rehabilitation of the railways, as well as a little more than 10 billion pesos in the construction of 300 new bridges, out of a total of 527 bridges over the length of the line. The remaining bridges will be rehabilitated.

The second part of Line K was originally expected to open in mid-2026.

As of April 2026, the second stage of the Line K rehabilitation was expected to be completed in June. The line would be extended to Huixtla, and then to Ciudad Hidalgo by the end of 2026.

In August 2026, the Line K extension into Ciudad Hidalgo was included in the Mexico-Guatemala Binational Plan 2027.

== Connections ==
The cross-border line from Ciudad Hidalgo, Chiapas in Mexico to Ciudad Tecún Umán in Guatemala was rebuilt in standard gauge in 2019.

Andrés Manuel López Obrador announced that the rehabilitation work of the Railway as well as the extension of Salina Cruz to Tapachula would be under the charge of the Secretariat of the Navy, as well as the state governments of Veracruz, Oaxaca, Chiapas, and Tabasco.

The connection project between the Guatemala railway and the Tren Interoceánico would also be announced, which will be carried out through the Rodolfo Robles border bridge that connects the cities of Tecún Umán, Guatemala.

The connection point in Mexico would be Ciudad Hidalgo, Chiapas, separated from north to south by the Suchiate River from the Guatemalan town and would connect with the Isthmus train with the railway from Ixtepec, Oaxaca to Tapachula, Chiapas.

== See also ==
- Rail transport in Mexico
- Rail transport in Guatemala
- Puente Rodolfo Robles, a current roadway and restored railway bridge connecting Ciudad Hidalgo with Ayutla
