= Tren Interoceánico =

Government-owned railway system in Mexico

Interoceanic Train of the Isthmus of Tehuantepec

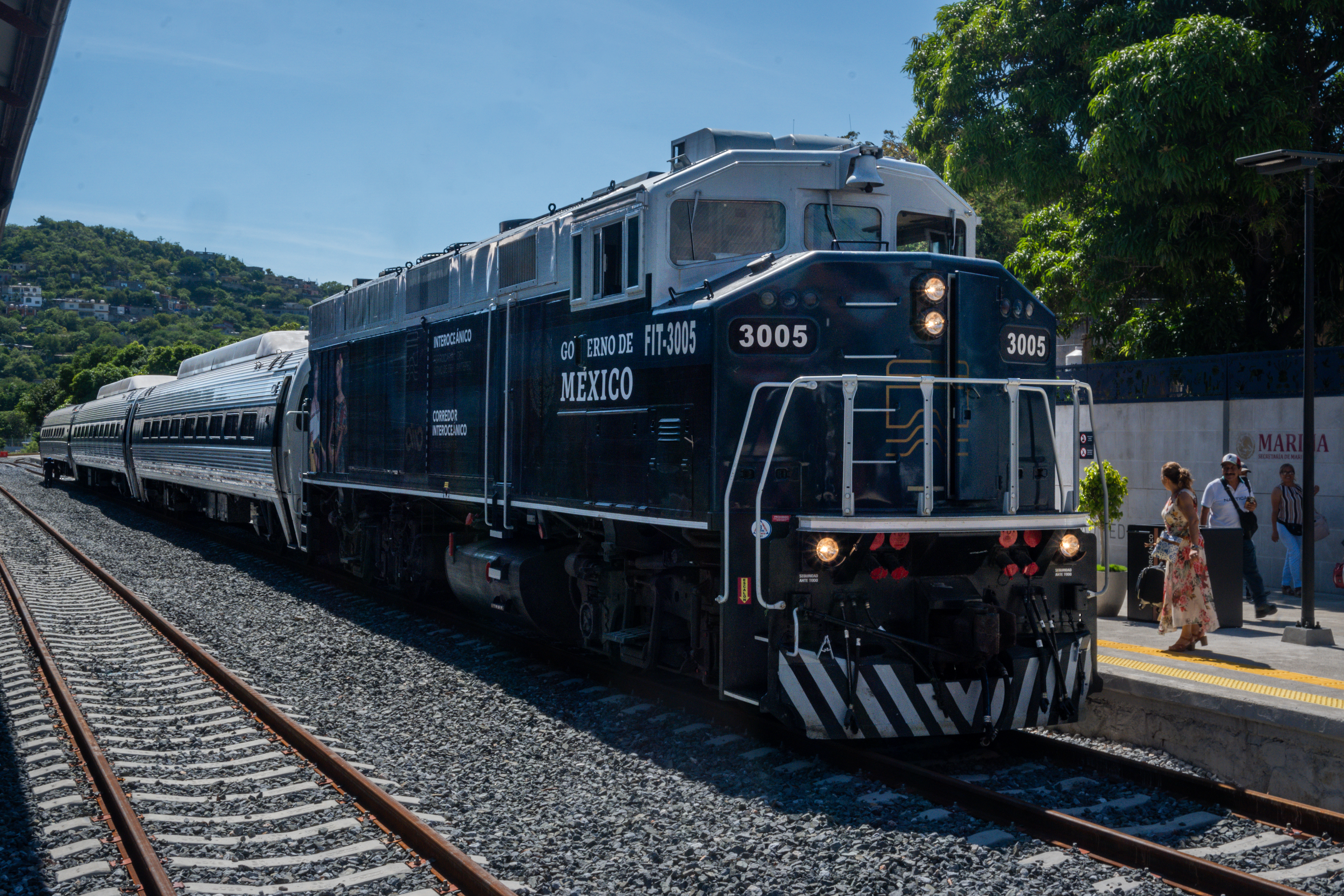
- An EMD F59PH of the Isthmus of Tehuantepec Railroad, pulling SPV-2000 cars at Salina Cruz station, Oaxaca, Mexico.

Overview
- Main regions: Oaxaca; Veracruz; Chiapas; Tabasco
- Fleet: See rolling stock
- Stations called at: 18
- Parent company: Secretariat of the Navy
- Headquarters: Corregidora Street, No. 700, Col. Centro, Coatzacoalcos, Veracruz, Mexico
- Reporting mark: FIT
- Locale: Southeastern Mexico
- Dates of operation: 1999–present

Technical
- Track gauge: 1,435 mm (4 ft 8 1/2 in) standard gauge
- Length: 1,200 km (750 mi)
- No. of tracks: 1
- Operating speed: Passenger: 100 km/h (62 mph); Freight: 70 km/h (43 mph)

Other
- Website: www.pasajerosinteroceanico.com.mx

The Ferrocarril del Istmo de Tehuantepec (Spanish: “Isthmus of Tehuantepec Railway”), also referred to as the Tren Interoceánico (Spanish: “Interoceanic Train”), (Note: (reporting mark FIT) (Ferrocarril del Istmo de Tehuantepec, S.A. de C.V.; English: Railway of the Isthmus of Tehuantepec), also known as Interoceanic Train of the Isthmus of Tehuantepec (Spanish: Tren Interoceánico del Istmo de Tehuantepec) or simply Tren Interoceánico (English: Interoceanic Train), Ferrocarril Interoceánico (English: Interoceanic Railway), Ferrocarril Transístmico (English: Trans-Isthmic Railroad) or simply Ferroistmo (English: Rail Isthmus)) is a railway system located in the Isthmus of Tehuantepec of Mexico. The system, which is operated by the Interoceanic Corridor of the Isthmus of Tehuantepec (CIIT) under the Secretariat of the Navy, and owned by the Mexican Government, carries both freight and passenger service between the coasts of the Pacific and Atlantic Oceans through the Isthmus.

The project consists of the renovation of existing railroads, which is expected to increase the speed of the freight train from 20 km/h (12 mph) to 70 km/h (43 mph), more than three times the current one. Meanwhile, the passenger train will be able to reach speeds of up to 100 km/h (62 mph).

== History ==
Rail lines in the Isthmus of Tehuantepec region began constructing in the late 19th century, with the first being the Puerto Mexico (Coatzacoalcos)-Salina Cruz line in 1907, for interoceanic freight service. Rail development continued into the late 20th century, driven by oil exploration and refinement projects in the region.

The Mexican Secretariat of Finance and Public Credit founded the Ferrocarril del Istmo de Tehuantepec (FIT) on March 3, 1999, in order to operate the rail line between Salina Cruz, Oaxaca and Medias Aguas, Veracruz, as well as the construction and operation of a rail line between Medias Aguas and Coatzacoalcos.

Ferrocarriles Chiapas-Mayab (FCCM), a subsidiary of Genesee & Wyoming (G&W), operated other rail lines in the region from 1999 to 2007 under a 30-year concession with the Mexican government; however, due to damages caused Hurricane Stan in 2005, G&W determined that it was economically infeasible to repair the rail lines and relinquished its concession to the Secretariat of Communications and Transportation in 2007, as well as liquidating FCCM. The rail lines and remaining assets were later transferred to FIT.

=== Redevelopment ===
On 7 June 2020, President Andrés Manuel López Obrador authorized the renovation of railway tracks and rehabilitation as passenger transport; the work was given an initial investment of more than 3 billion pesos, with about 20 billion pesos total planned to be allocated for this project.

On 17 September 2023, President Andrés Manuel López Obrador inaugurated Line Z for freight transport. On 22 December, passenger service began on Line Z. Later, on 13 September 2024, passenger service on Line FA opened.

A derailment of Line Z near Asunción Ixtaltepec, Oaxaca, on 28 December 2025 left 13 people dead and around 100 more injured.

== Features ==
As of December 2023, Line Z served seven stations in 303 kilometres (188 mi) of single track, traveling between Coatzacoalcos and Salina Cruz for seven hours. The old stations that were on the route and that were chosen to form the project, were completely remodeled, while retaining the original architectural style.

== Lines and routes ==
- Line FA - Passenger line that runs mainly parallel to the Gulf Coast, and connects the port city of Coatzacoalcos with Palenque, Chiapas. It has 9 stations and has an available transfer to the Tren Maya at Palenque/Pakal Na.
  - Branch DB - Branch freight line that runs from Roberto Ayala station to the Pemex Olmeca Refinery in the Port of Dos Bocas in Paraíso.
- Line K - Passenger line that runs mainly parallel to the Pacific Coast, and connects the port city of Salina Cruz with Tonala, Chiapa. The line briefly runs parallel to Line Z, with transfers at Salina Cruz and Ixtepec before turning southeast towards the coast. Line K is under construction as of 2026, with 10 active stations and 18 total planned. Complete service is expected to extend down to Ciudad Hidalgo, with a connection to the Guatemalan rail network at the Rodolfo Robles rail-road bridge.
  - Branch KA: Branch freight line that runs from Tapachula station to Port Chiapas.
- Line Z - Passenger line that runs mainly north-south, and connects Coatzacoalcos with Salina Cruz. The line follows the 1907 Puerto Mexico-Salina Cruz rail line, and is the only interoceanic line on the system. It has 10 stations and has available transfers to Line FA at Coatzacoalcos, as well as Line K at Salina Cruz and Ixtepec.
  - ZA Branch: Branch freight line that runs from Hibueras Junction (between Jáltipan and Coatzacoalcos) to the Pemex General Lázaro Cárdenas Refinery in Minatitlán.

== Rolling stock ==
=== Acquisition history ===
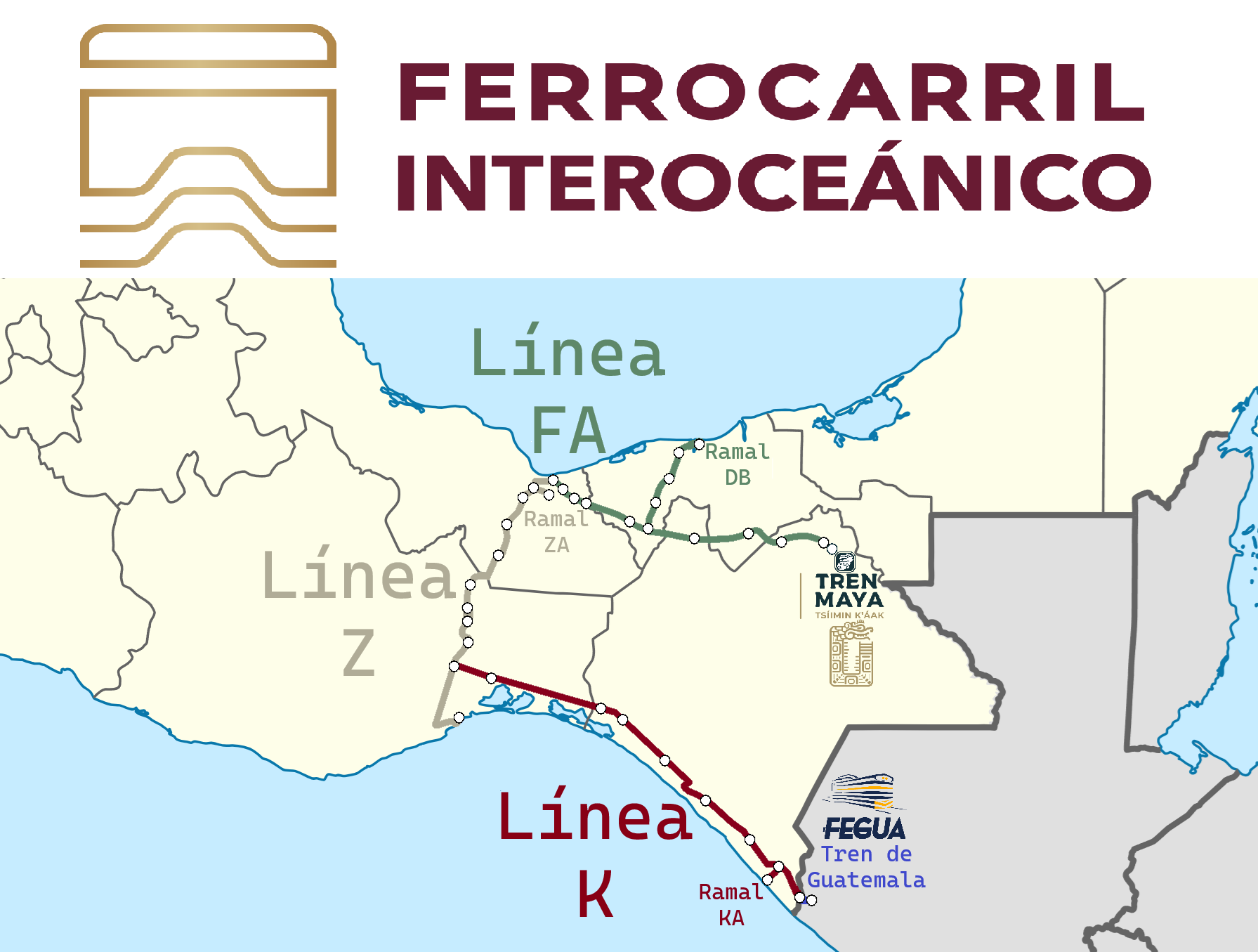
Map of the various lines of the Tren Interoceánico

In August 2023, the website Railtech.com reported a number of InterCity 125 high-speed train sets, originally built for British Rail, had been seen at the Port of Great Yarmouth being loaded on to a ship bound for Mexico. Unconfirmed reports suggested this second-hand rolling stock was bound for the Ferrocarril del Istmo de Tehuantepec.

On 4 September 2023, the news website Diario del Istmo posted a story containing a powerpoint slide from the Sistema Portuario Nacional, confirming that a group of three Class 43 locomotives and 11 Mark 3 coaches had been exported to Mexico for use on Ferrocarril del Istmo de Tehuantepec. In Great Britain, the Class 43 locomotives were numbered GWR 43022, 43158, and 43170; while the coaches were numbered LNER 41091, 41100, 42026, 42179, 42401, 42402, 42405, 44034, 44061, 44063, 44094.

In addition to these InterCity 125 trainsets, several other types of rolling stock will be used. The Ferrocarril Transístmico purchased three EMD SD70M locomotives from the Union Pacific Railroad, former UP 4378, 4671, and 4674. and 12 passenger cars (including 3 Amfleet cars and the Stampede Pass, a dome car built by the Budd Company in 1954) from the Railway Excursion Management Company (Railexco). The first of the SD70Ms, numbered 4378, were presented on 13 August 2023.

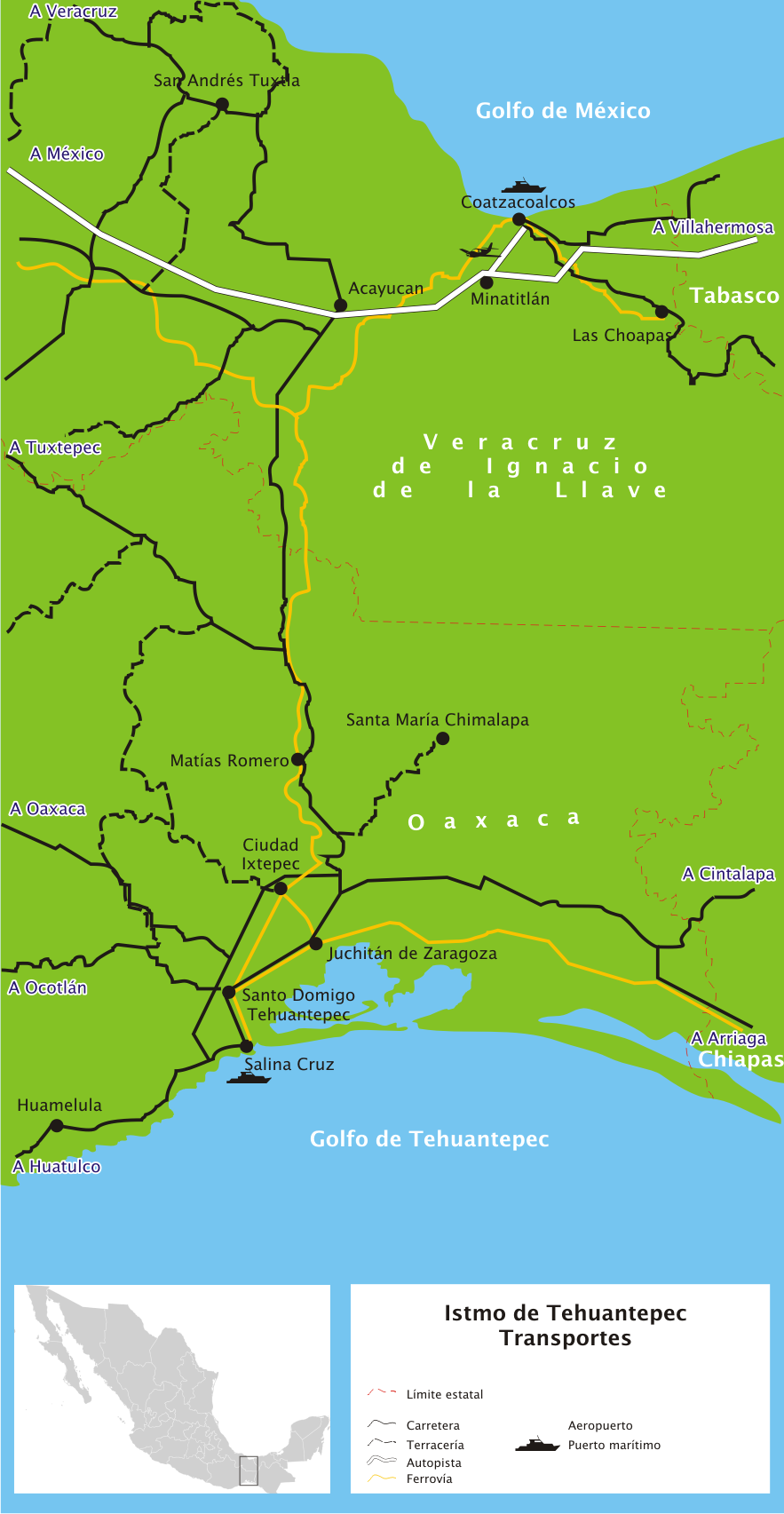
Transport routes in the Isthmus of Tehuantepec. This map shows roads and ports, as well as the railroad; the map legend is in Spanish.

Meanwhile, in September 2023, an EMD F59PH locomotive was seen in Mobile, Alabama, reportedly on its way to the Tren Interoceánico. Later, an F59PH, now numbered FIT 3005 would, alongside an SD70M numbered FIT 4671, be used on the inaugural run of Line Z on 22 December that year. FIT 3005 was originally GO Transit 520, and during the late-2010s, this unit (then numbered LTEX 18520) was one of three ex-GO Transit F59PHs leased to Metrolink in the late-2010s. After Metrolink retired the ex-GO units in 2022, 18520 became one of two FIT F59PHs, with the other being the former LTEX 18522 (ex-GOT 522).

Furthermore, five Budd SPV-2000 cars were purchased from Railexco for use on the Tren Interoceánico. According to Railexco's official Facebook account, these cars were once owned by Amtrak, and later, by the Connecticut Department of Transportation.

On 26 August 2023, two Stadler Citylink sets from the former Puebla–Cholula Tourist Train were brought to Coatzacoalcos railway station for use on the Ferrocarril Transístmico.

=== List of rolling stock ===
Model	Thumbnail	Road numbers	Active fleet	Year	History	Type
Road power
EMD F59PHI		SLPX 876, 878-881	9	1994	Ex-Metrolink, same numbers	Passenger
EMD F59PHI		SLPX 884-887	9	2001	Ex-Metrolink, same numbers	Passenger
EMD GP10		1801	1	????	Ex-SBZX 7579	Freight
EMD GP20		2002	1	????	????	Freight
EMD GP38-2		2004	1	????	Ex-NS 5002, originally Southern Railway	Freight
EMD GP40-2LW		3002	1	????		Freight
EMD GP40-2		3004				Freight
EMD F59PH		3005-3006	2 (Note: 3006 has been wrecked, while 3005 is currently active)	1988	Ex-LTEX 18520, 18522 (leased to Metrolink in the 2010s), nee-RBRX 18520, 18522, nee-GOT 520, 522.	Passenger
Class 43		3007-3014	8	1975-1982	Ex-GWR 43170, 43022, 43007, 43306, 43307, 43316, 43320, and 43378.	Passenger
EMD SD70MAC		SLPX 4002, 4005-4008, SBZX 8900 series			Ex-SLPX 8973, 8983, 8984, 8967, 4008; nee-BNSF 8973, 8983, 8984, 8967, and ????	Freight
EMD SD70M		4376, 4378, 4380, 4381		2001	Ex-UP same numbers	Freight
EMD SD70M		4606, 4607, 4611, 4666, 4671, 4674		2001	Ex-UP same numbers	Freight
GE C44-9W		4444, 4454			Ex-KCS same numbers, nee-BNSF	Freight
EMD GP38AC		SBZX 3018			Ex-CPR 3018	
EMD GP40-2L		SBZX 9529, 9582			Ex-ACWR, nee-CN same numbers	Freight

== See also ==
- Tren Maya
- El Insurgente
