= Pichucalco railway station =

Former railway station in Mexico

Pichucalco

General information
- Location: Pichucalco, Chiapas, Mexico

History
- Opened: 1930s

Former services
Preceding station	Tren Interoceánico	Following station
Juárez toward Coatzacoalcos	Coatzacoalcos-Mérida Line	Teapa toward Mérida
Location

Pichucalco is a former railway station in Pichucalco, Chiapas, Mexico.

== History ==
The Pichucalco station was built on the Coatzacoalcos–Mérida line. Planning on the original station began in July 1934 by the Ferrocarriles Nacionales de México. Construction work began at the end of 1935 using the line located from Sarabia, on the Ferrocarril de Tehuantepec. When the general study of the route was completed, the Sarabia junction was abandoned, and the port of Coatzacoalcos became the eastern terminal of the Southeastern Railway. By 29 December 1934, the company Líneas Férreas de México was created by presidential decree, which continued the work started by the Empresa de los Nacionales.
