= Roberto Ayala railway station =

Railway station in Huimanguillo, Tabasco

Coordinates: 17°40′05″N 93°28′40″W

Roberto Ayala

General information
- Location: Huimanguillo, Tabasco, Mexico
- Platforms: 2
- Tracks: 1

History
- Opened: 1935 (originally); September 2024 (reopening)

Future services
Preceding station	Tren Interoceánico	Following station
Las Choapas toward Coatzacoalcos	Line FA	Juárez toward Pakal Ná (Palenque)

Roberto Ayala railway station is a railway station in Huimanguillo, Tabasco.

== History ==
The station was built on the Coatzacoalcos-Mérida line. Planning on the original station began in June 1934 by the Ferrocarriles Nacionales de México. Construction work began at the end of 1935 using the line located from Sarabia, on the Ferrocarril de Tehuantepec. When the general study of the route was completed, the Sarabia junction was abandoned, and the port of Coatzacoalcos became the eastern terminal of the Southeastern Railway. By 29 December, 1934, the company Líneas Férreas de México was created by presidential decree, which continued the work started by the Empresa de los Nacionales.
