= Teapa Municipality =

Municipality in the Mexican state of Tabasco

Coordinates: 17°32′07″N 92°45′03″W

Teapa
- Municipality
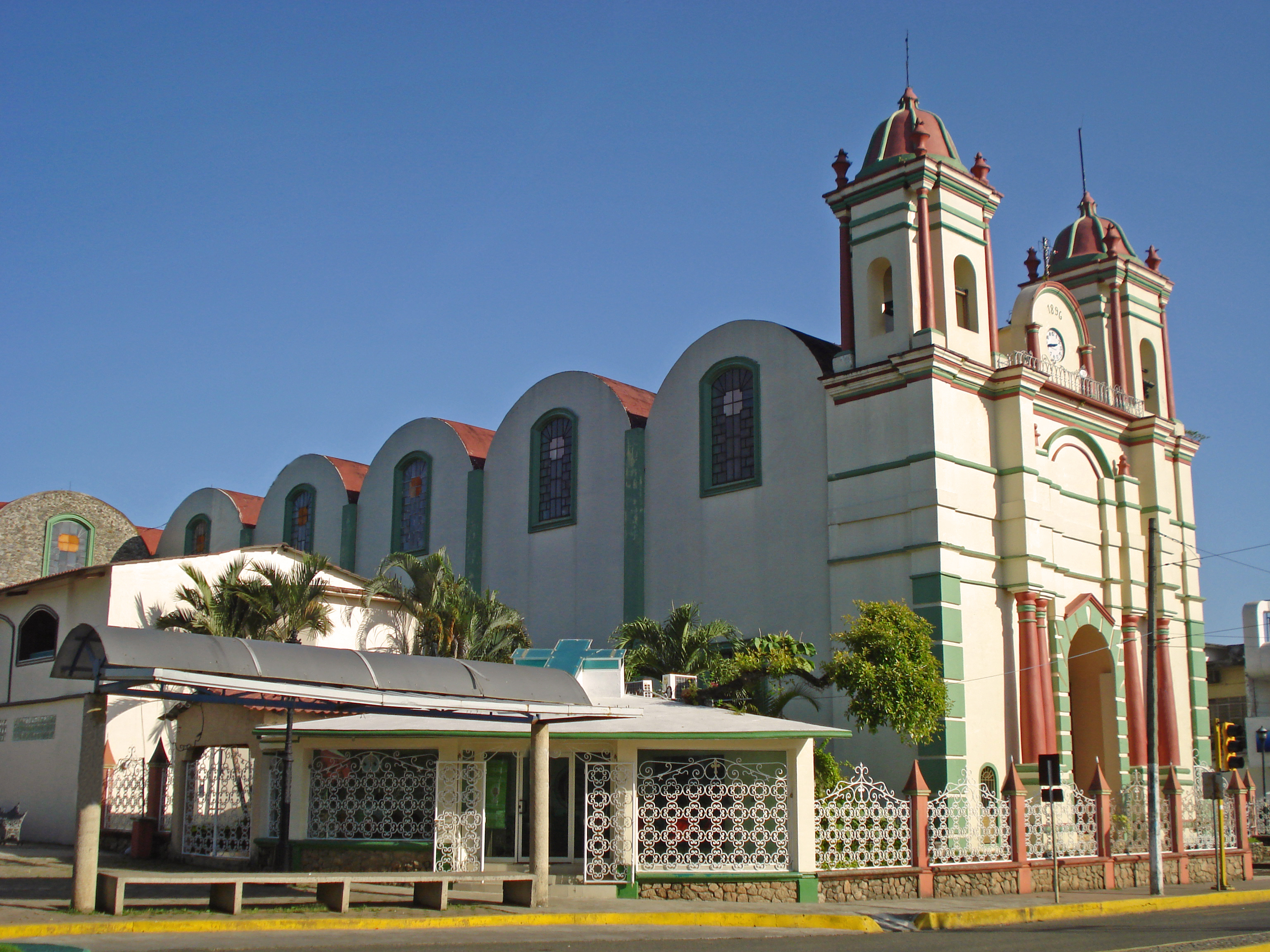
- Iglesia de Santiago Apóstol (1725)
- Interactive map of Teapa
- Country: Mexico
- State: Tabasco
- Seat: Teapa

Government
  - Federal electoral district: Tabasco's 6th

Population (2005)
  - Total: 49,262
- Time zone: UTC-6 (Zona Centro)

Teapa is a municipality in the Mexican state of Tabasco, located in the southeastern part of the country near the Gulf of Mexico and bordering the state of Chiapas. Declared a Pueblo Mágico (Magic Town) for its landscape and traditions, its main attractions include the Grutas de Coconá caves and the historic Estación del Ferrocarril. It is also a significant center for banana production.

== Etymology ==
The name Teapa comes from the Nahuatl words tetl and apan, which mean "river over stones" or "stone's river". It refers to one of the rivers that crosses the town.

== Geography ==
The municipal seat is the city of Teapa. The municipality is divided into 18 ejidos, 15 ranches, 1 populated, 6 neighborhoods and 1 villa. Its territorial extension is 679.78 square kilometres (262.46 sq mi), which corresponds to 2.76% of the state total; this places the municipality 16th in territorial extension. There is a border to the north with the municipalities of Centro and Jalapa; and in the south, east and west with the state of Chiapas. According to the results presented for the 2nd population and home count from 2005, the municipality has a population of 49,262 people.

=== Climate ===
The weather is warm and humid with rain all year round; it has an annual average temperature of 27.8 °C (82.0 °F). The monthly highest average is in June from and the lowest average is in December.

== Transportation ==
The Tren Interoceánico operates a station for its Line FA in Teapa, which opened on 13 September 2024.

Current services
| Preceding station | Tren Interoceánico | Following station |
|---|---|---|
| Juárez toward Coatzacoalcos | Line FA | Salto de Agua toward Pakal Ná (Palenque) |

== Notable people ==
- Luis Arenal Bastar, artist
- Fátima Bosch Fernández, Miss Universe 2025
- Dolores Correa Zapata (1853–1924), teacher, writer, poet, and advocate for women's rights
- Ruben Rodas, saxofonista
- Feliw Fulgencio Palavicini,
- Saul Wade Tellaheche,
