= Las Choapas =

Municipality in Veracruz, Mexico

Coordinates: 17°54′N 94°05′W

- Municipality
- Location in Mexico Las Choapas (Mexico)
- Country: Mexico
- State: Veracruz
- Demonym: (in Spanish)
- Time zone: UTC−6 (CST)

Las Choapas is a city and its surrounding municipality in the southeastern extremes of the Mexican state of Veracruz. It is bordered by the municipalities of Uxpanapa, Minatitlán, Moloacán, and Agua Dulce in Veracruz, Huimanguillo in Tabasco, Cintalapa and Tecpatán in Chiapas, and Santa María Chimalapa in Oaxaca. Its major products are cattle breeding, corn, oil, fruit, sugar, and rubber. In the past it had a rice miller. It is one of the largest municipalities in Veracruz, with an area of 2,851.2 km^{2} (1,100.85 sq mi). At the 2005 census the city had a population of 40,773 inhabitants, while the municipality had a population of 70,092. It is a very hot place, as temperature reaches up to 40 degrees Celsius. It has had some tornadoes in the past. It is connected to the communities of Raudales-Ocozocoautla in Chiapas through the Chiapas bridge.

Twelve bodies whose hands were tied are found along a road in Las Choapas on January 18, 2021. Witness say the men killed belonged to a family from the ejido of Aguas Frías. There are armed Grupos de Autodefensa Comunitaria (vigilantes) in Las Choapas and at least six drug cartels operate in the state.

== Transportation ==
Since 13 September 2024, Las Choapas has been the location of a stop on Line FA, a line of the Tren Interoceánico.

Current services
Preceding station	Tren Interoceánico	Following station
Cuichapa toward Coatzacoalcos	Line FA	Roberto Ayala toward Pakal Ná (Palenque)
