= Juárez, Chiapas =

Juárez
- Municipality
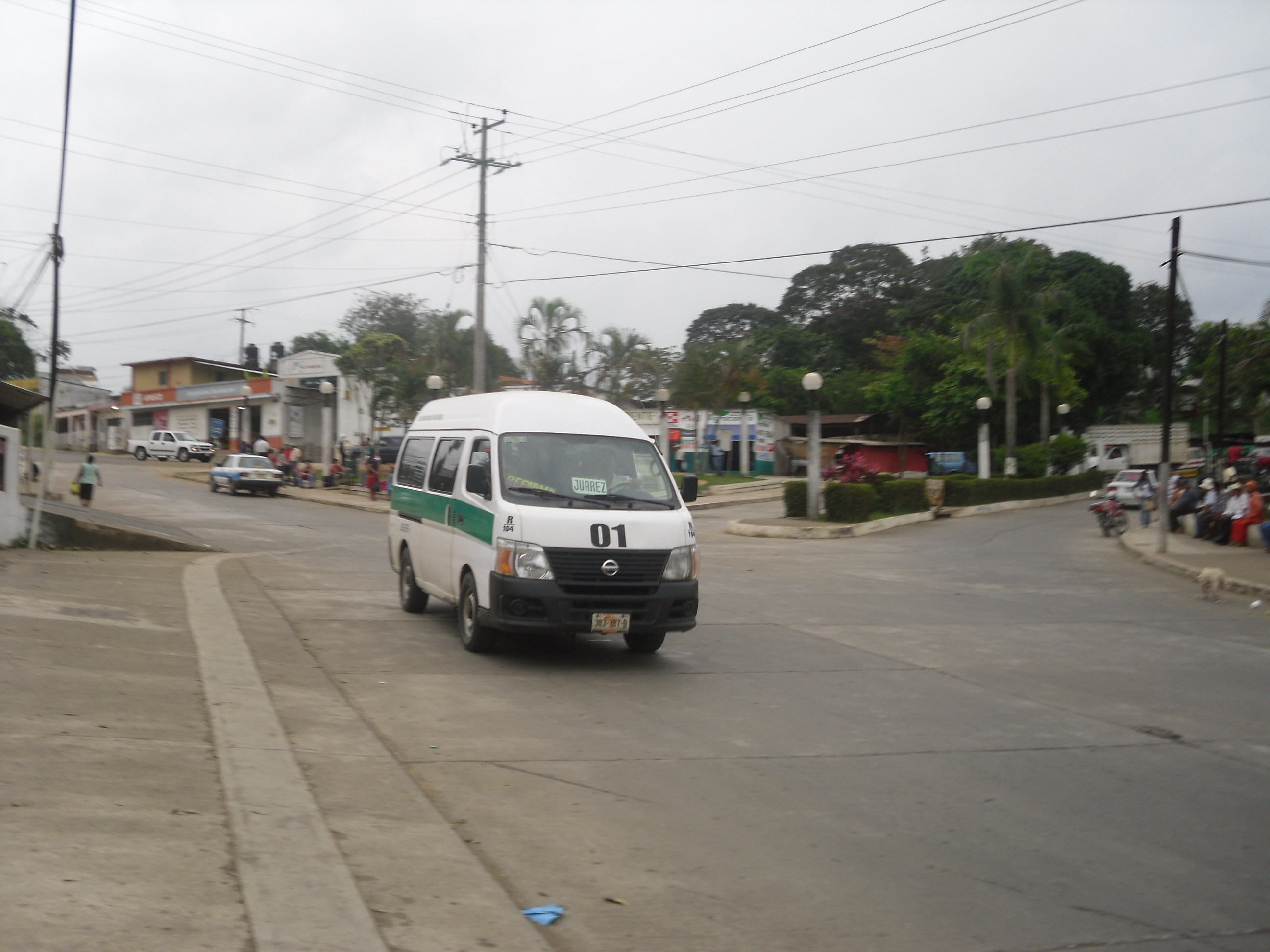

- Municipality of Juárez in Chiapas

- Location in Mexico
- Coordinates: 17°37′N 93°10′W
- Country: Mexico
- State: Chiapas

Area
  - Total: 161.5 km^{2} (62.4 sq mi)

Population (2010)
  - Total: 21,084

Juárez is a town and municipality in the Mexican state of Chiapas in southern Mexico.

As of 2010, the municipality had a total population of 21,084, up from 19,956 as of 2005. It covers an area of 161.5 km^{2}.

As of 2010, the town of Juárez had a population of 7,286. Other than the town of Juárez, the municipality had 49 localities, the largest of which (with 2010 populations in parentheses) were: Nuevo Volcán Chichonal (1,162) and El Triunfo 1ra. Sección (Cardona) (1,141), classified as rural.

== Railway ==
Tren Interoceánico operates a station for its Line FA in Juárez, which opened on 13 September 2024.

Current services
Preceding station	Tren Interoceánico	Following station
Roberto Ayala toward Coatzacoalcos	Line FA	Teapa toward Pakal Ná (Palenque)
