= Mogoñé railway station =

Railway station

Mogoñé

General information
- Location: Matías Romero, Oaxaca, Mexico
- Platforms: 1
- Tracks: 3

History
- Opened: June 29, 1894 (originally); December 22, 2023 (reopened)

Services
Preceding station	Tren Interoceánico	Following station
Matías Romero toward Salina Cruz	Line Z	Donají toward Coatzacoalcos
Future services
Matías Romero toward Ixtepec	Tehuanito North	Sarabia toward Ubero
Location

Mogoñé is a train station in San Juan Guichicovi, Oaxaca.

== History ==
The original station was built in on June 29, 1894 for the Ferrocarril Transístmico. Passenger trains would use this station from then until late into the 20th century.

On August 29, 2023, after 25 years without the railroad passing through the station, an EMD SD70M owned by the Mexican government passed through the station for the first tests of the locomotives on the rehabilitated track. The line would then be reopened on December 22 that same year, although the station itself is still incomplete. Despite being incomplete, on December 22, Raymundo Morales Ángeles, the director of the Interoceanic Corridor of the Isthmus of Tehuantepec, announced that the Mogoñé station is reopened.
