= 2025 Oaxaca train derailment =

Transport accident in Mexico

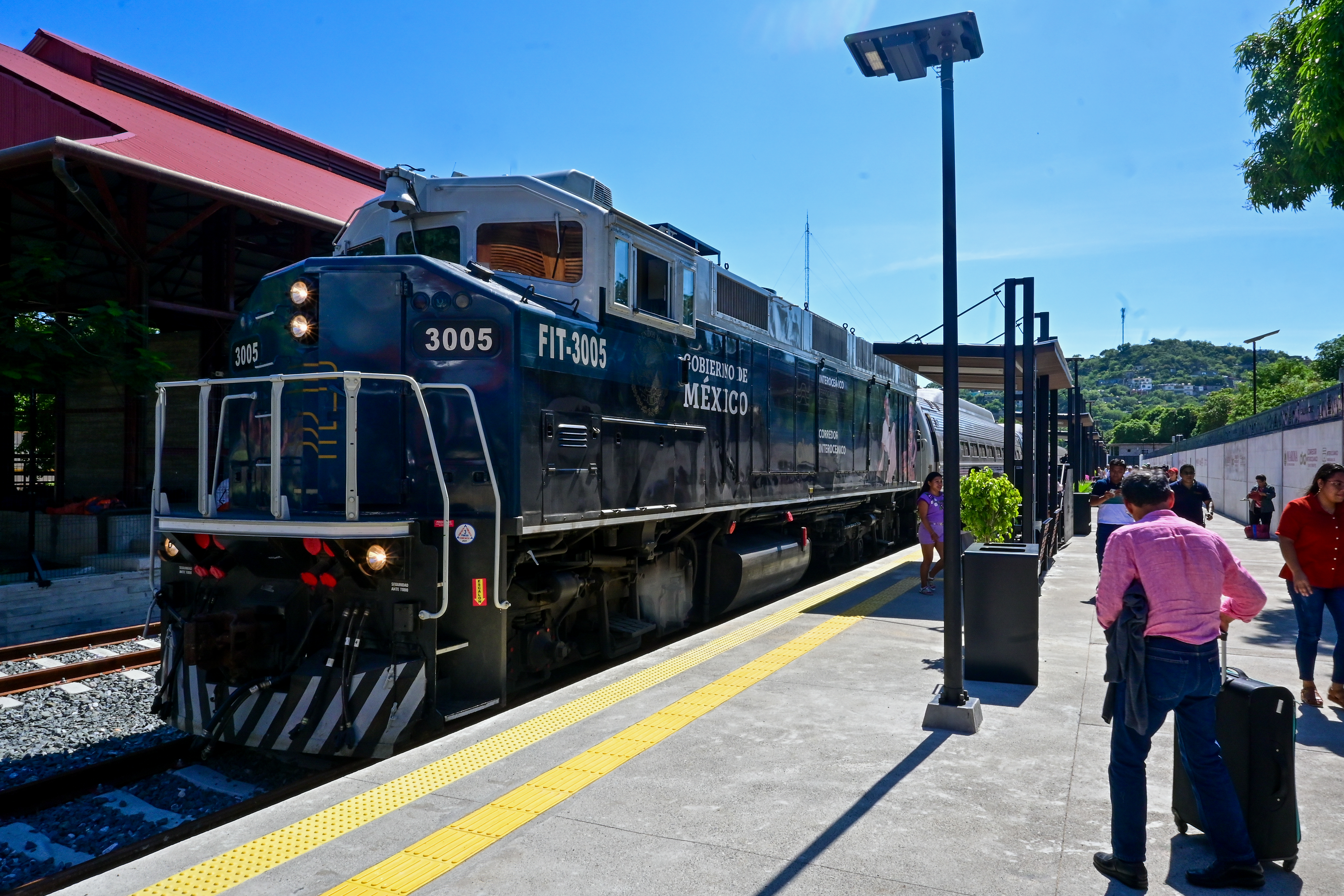
- EMD F59PH locomotive similar to the derailed train

- Location within Oaxaca

Details
- Date: 28 December 2025
- Location: Asunción Ixtaltepec, Oaxaca, Mexico
- Coordinates: 16°40′56″N 95°00′04″W
- Country: Mexico
- Line: Line Z
- Operator: Tren Interoceánico
- Incident type: Derailment
- Cause: Overspeed at the curve

Statistics
- Trains: 1
- Passengers: 241
- Crew: 9
- Deaths: 14
- Injured: 98

On 28 December 2025, a Tren Interoceánico train derailed in Asunción Ixtaltepec, a municipality of the Mexican state of Oaxaca. The derailment killed 14 people and injured another 98. According to the official investigation, the drivers oversped at the derailment curve.

== Background ==
Line Z of the Tren Interoceánico was inaugurated in 2023 as a major infrastructure project under President Andrés Manuel López Obrador to develop southeast Mexico. The initiative was designed to modernize the rail link across the Isthmus of Tehuantepec, a land bridge connecting the Pacific port of Salina Cruz, Oaxaca, with Coatzacoalcos, Veracruz, on the Gulf of Mexico. The Mexican government had stated that renewal works would be carried out using the existing route.

For the operation of the Tren Interoceánico, second-hand rolling stock built between 1976 and 1981 was acquired from the United Kingdom and the United States. The fleet includes F59PH and F59PHI diesel locomotives, SD70M locomotives, British Rail Class 43 (HST) locomotives, and passenger cars such as Amtrak Amfleet and Budd SPV-2000 railcars. The F59PH units were obtained from the Metrolink and GO Transit systems.

The Superior Auditor of the Federation reported that the derailment area had "very steep gradients and pronounced curves", and that the first rehabilitation project carried out by the company Daniferrotools in 2019 was deficient. However, the public investigation did not determine whether any corrective works were undertaken afterward. The audit concluded that the repairs were carried out "without fully completed studies, designs, and an execution program". Daniferrotools, however, denied having carried out work on the accident site, stating that its contract was terminated before any construction was performed. The company cited several factors for the cancellation, including the occupation of the railway by the Chivela community and the identification of technical discrepancies between the project as delivered and the actual conditions of the terrain.

López Obrador stated that his son, Gonzalo López Beltrán, was acting as an honorary supervisor during the construction of the line, saying that he "helped me monitor the progress of the works, the laying of the tracks, matters related to the trains, and the construction of the breakwater in Salina Cruz, together with the Navy". In 2024, the NGO Mexicans Against Corruption and Impunity documented that friends and relatives of Gonzalo were involved in the supply of ballast for the Interoceanic Corridor and the Tren Maya. In a leaked conversation allegedly between businessman Amílcar Olán and Pedro Salazar Beltrán, cousin of Gonzalo, it was said that the laboratory responsible for analyzing the ballast had been bribed to approve it. Salazar reportedly added that "once [the Tren Maya] derails, it's going to be another mess". In another leaked conversation, Olán reportedly told his brother that Gonzalo would seek to have him operate a quarry in Oaxaca to obtain ballast.

=== Prior incidents ===
The December derailment was the fourth incident to impact the Tren Interoceánico's operations in 2025: on 25 June, a van invaded an ungated level crossing in Salto de Agua, Chiapas, and was struck by a train; on 10 July, a truck was hit by another train at a level crossing in Macuspana, Tabasco, leaving the locomotive severely damaged; and on 20 December, a passenger train collided with a tanker truck carrying asphalt in Pichucalco, Chiapas. Additional accidents were reported in 2023 and 2024.

== Crash ==
The train derailed and partly tilted off the side of a cliff around 09:30 CST (UTC–6) on 28 December while it was rounding a bend between the towns of Nizandá and Chivela in the municipality of Asunción Ixtaltepec. The accident site was described as an unpopulated area covered with scrub and bushes on a section of track known as la Curva de la Herradura (lit. 'Horseshoe Curve').

The train was bound for Coatzacoalcos station and had left the Salina Cruz terminus about 90 minutes earlier. The derailment occurred some kilometers short of Chivela railway station.

On 29 December, Secretary of the Navy Raymundo Morales Ángeles said that the train had left Salina Cruz at 08:00 and that the derailment occurred at 09:29 at km Z-230+290 of the track. The train's two locomotives and four carriages were derailed, with the first carriage falling down a 6.5-meter (21 ft) embankment and the second hanging at a near-vertical angle.

In the aftermath, several survivors said they had been concerned about the speed at which the train had been taking the curves.

== Victims ==
The train was carrying 241 passengers and 9 crew members. Initially, 13 people were killed and 98 others were injured. Among the victims was Israel Gallegos Soto, a journalist and director of Oaxaca Mundo News and a collaborator with El Heraldo Radio Oaxaca. Of the injured, 38 were hospitalized, including five in serious condition. Another person died on 1 January 2026. The train's driver was unhurt.

== Investigation ==
The train's event recorder was recovered from the wreckage. President Claudia Sheinbaum and other top level officials, including Navy Secretary Morales and IMSS director Zoé Robledo, traveled to the site of the crash. The president announced immediate payments of 30,000 pesos (some US$1,700) to assist bereaved families with their funeral expenses, with additional compensation and insurance payouts to follow. An investigation into the accident was opened, led by the office of the Attorney General (FGR) under Ernestina Godoy Ramos.

On 27 January 2026, the FGR reported that the cause of the derailment was overspeed when passing through the derailment curve (65 kilometers per hour [40 mph], when the maximum for that stretch of track is 50 km/h [31 mph]). The event recorder also reported speeds of 111 km/h (69 mph) on sections of track with a maximum of 70 km/h (43 mph). No defects were found in the train's brakes or in the track along the curve where the derailment took place. The train's driver was arrested on 26 January and the dispatcher the day after. The driver did not activate the emergency brake.

The train's driver and the engineer were operating with federal railway licenses that had expired in 2020. About it, Morales Ángeles stated that it was an administrative matter and not a cause of the derailment. A technical inspection report conducted eleven days before the incident indicated significant wear on the train's wheel flanges. Following the report published by the FGR, Latinus published a preliminary report from the FGR, which outlined additional lines of investigation not officially disclosed by the general attorney. According to the document, the train's wheels showed excessive wear, the train lacked a speedometer, the second locomotive was not equipped with a dead man's switch, the onboard security cameras were nonfunctional, and the train did not have a fire suppression system. Regarding the alleged lack of a speedometer, Morales Ángeles said the claim was false and that the investigations were ongoing, adding that the FGR's report was preliminary.

The operator classified information related to the railcars for five years on grounds of national security, stating that its disclosure could pose a risk of "sabotage, theft of parts, and the planning of illicit acts".

== Political reactions ==
Reactions to the accident were shaped by the political symbolism of the Interoceanic Train as one of former president López Obrador's flagship infrastructure projects. Opposition politicians had previously voiced concerns about the speed with which those projects were built, about the rush to inaugurate them before the end of the president's term, and about the decision to place them under the authority of the Secretariat of the Navy. Following the derailment, Senator Alejandro Moreno of the Institutional Revolutionary Party (PRI) called for the projects' construction and operation to be put on hold pending a full audit, while Senator Mario Vázquez Robles of the National Action Party (PAN) said the tragedy in Oaxaca was the result of "criminal negligence" caused by a network of corruption and influence-peddling and demanded that the investigation be taken out of the government's hands and assigned to independent foreign experts. Jorge Máynez, the national coordinator of the Citizens' Movement (MC) and its 2024 presidential candidate, said the militarization of the country, under successive presidents since Felipe Calderón, had proved to be a "resounding failure".

President Claudia Sheinbaum responded that the opposition was seeking to discredit the government, stating that "whatever we do, whatever happens, they will always be there in their dynamic of denigrating us". Senator Gerardo Fernández Noroña of the ruling National Regeneration Movement (Morena) called TV personality Pedro Sola "a pig" in response to his tweet that "this administration can't get anything right".

Writing in Nexos following the publication of the FGR's preliminary report, the academic and journalist Raúl Trejo Delarbre drew a parallel between the Oaxaca derailment and the 1975 Mexico City Metro crash, in which some 30 people were killed, defects in the rolling stock were ignored, and blame was placed solely on the driver: "The Attorney General's Office's hasty effort to blame the train workers without considering the flaws identified in its own investigation suggests it has been decided to close the case, blame those who were not responsible, and protect those who made a defective train."

== Aftermath ==
In June 2026, Sheinbaum announced that several curves, including the one where the accident occurred, would be corrected to ensure safety. The next month, a train derailed in the same section with no casualties reported.

== See also ==
- Transportation in Mexico
