= Tomás Ruiz González =

Mexican politician

- Born: March 23, 1963 (age 62); Mexico City

Tomás José Ruiz González (born March 23, 1963) is a Mexican politician from the Institutional Revolutionary Party (PRI), who most recently served as a state government official in Veracruz under Governor Javier Duarte. He previously served as director of the National Lottery and as president of the New Alliance Party (Nueva Alianza), a position he held from November 28, 2006, to August 28, 2007.

== Biography ==
Tomás Ruiz holds a law degree from the Escuela Libre de Derecho, has a diploma from the Autonomous Technological Institute of Mexico and a master's from Columbia University. In the late 1980s and 1990s, he held important positions in the Bank of Mexico and the Secretariat of Finance and Public Credit, for which he was twice the Undersecretary of Finance, as well as the first president of the Tax Administration Service (SAT).

In 2000, President Vicente Fox, elected for the National Action Party (PAN) appointed him director general of Banobras. This non-PRI position conflicted with the leadership of his party, and he resigned in 2003 to be nominated by the PRI as federal deputy candidate for the 59th Congress. He was a proportional representation deputy elected from the third electoral region and served on a trio of business-related commissions: Finances and Public Credit, Budget and Public Accounts, and Oversight of the Superior Auditor of the Federation.

He worked alongside PRI parliamentary coordinator Elba Esther Gordillo in the Chamber of Deputies when a conflict arose between Gordillo and the president of the PRI, Roberto Madrazo Pintado. He supported a failed fiscal reform measure that would have extended the application of value-added tax to food and medicine products and wound up dividing the PRI parliamentary faction in the Chamber of Deputies. After the dismissal of Gordillo from the PRI, Ruiz González resigned from the Chamber of Deputies and was replaced by José Luis García Mercado. In 2004, he took the position as head of the National Lottery; in October 2005, he broke ties with the PRI, of which he had been a member for 20 years.

On November 29, 2006, he was elected president of Nueva Alianza, replacing Miguel Ángel Jiménez Godínez. He resigned just nine months later and was replaced by Jorge Kahwagi.

In 2010, Ruiz González's political career was resuscitated when new Governor of Veracruz Javier Duarte appointed him as the state's Secretary of Finance, a position in which he remained until March 2013, when he resigned for "personal reasons" and left the department in a severe cash crisis. He rejoined the PRI in July 2012. Two years after leaving the state government, Duarte put Ruiz back in his cabinet, this time as state secretary of infrastructure and public works.

In July 2016, one local PAN politician said that Ruiz had "disappeared" from the state of Veracruz, a year after awarding a concession for an underwater tunnel in Coatzacoalcos that was still not complete.
