= Matías Romero (disambiguation) =

Matías Romero (1837–1898) was a Mexican politician.

Matías Romero may also refer to:

- Matías Romero, Oaxaca, Mexico
  - Matías Romero railway station
- Matías Romero (footballer) (b. 1996), an Argentine footballer
- Instituto Matías Romero, the diplomatic academy of the Mexican foreign service
