= Pino Suárez (disambiguation) =

José María Pino Suárez (1869–1913) was the seventh and last vice-president of Mexico. Things named after him include:

- Pino Suárez metro station, a Mexico City Metro station in downtown Mexico City
- Pino Suárez monorail station, a Metrorrey station in downtown Monterrey along Line 4
- Pino Suárez railway station (Chiapas), a Tren Interoceánico station in Chiapas, Mexico
- Pino Suárez (Mexico City Metrobús), a BRT station in Mexico City
- Pino Suárez Sur (Mexico City Metrobús), a BRT station in Mexico City
- Toluca Centro railway station, otherwise known as Pino Suárez, a train station in Toluca, Mexico
