= Jesús Carranza (disambiguation) =

Jesús Carranza was a Mexican colonel.

Jesús Carranza may also refer to:

- Jesús Carranza, Veracruz, a municipality in Mexico
  - Jesús Carranza railway station
- Jesús Carranza Cortés, a Mexican potter
