= Medias Aguas railway station =

Railway station

Coordinates: 17°40′10″N 95°01′47″W

Medias Aguas

General information
- Location: Medias Aguas, Veracruz, Mexico
- Platforms: 1
- Tracks: 3

History
- Opened: December 15, 1894 (originally); December 22, 2023 (reopening)
- Closed: 1992 (originally)

Services
Preceding station	Tren Interoceánico	Following station
Jesús Carranza toward Salina Cruz	Line Z	Jáltipan toward Coatzacoalcos
Location

Medias Aguas is a railway station in Medias Aguas, Sayula de Alemán, Veracruz, Mexico.

== History ==
The station was built on the trunk line of the Ferrocarril Transístmico, which was completed on 15 December 1894. This 309-kilometer line connected the Pacific Ocean with the Atlantic Ocean.

In 1992, the station was closed to passenger service. However, in 2023, operations on the Ferrocarril Transístmico was transferred from Ferrosur to the Secretariat of the Navy, as part of the plan to rehabilitate the line. Passenger service returned to the station on December 22 that year.
