= Donají railway station =

Railway station in Oaxaca, Mexico

Coordinates: 17.2221°N 95.0496°W

Donají

General information
- Location: Donají, Oaxaca, Mexico
- Platforms: 1
- Tracks: 2

History
- Opened: June 29, 1894 (originally); December 22, 2023 (reopened)

Services
Preceding station	Tren Interoceánico	Following station
Mogoñé toward Salina Cruz	Line Z	Jesús Carranza toward Coatzacoalcos
Future services
Sarabia toward Ixtepec	Tehuanito North	Ubero Terminus
Location

Donají is a railway station in Donají, Oaxaca.

== History ==
The original station was built on June 29, 1894, as part of the Ferrocarril Transístmico that connected the Pacific Ocean with the Atlantic Ocean.

The line was reopened on December 22, 2023, although the station itself is still incomplete. Despite this, on December 22, Raymundo Morales Ángeles, the director of the Interoceanic Corridor of the Isthmus of Tehuantepec, announced that the Donají station is opened.
