= Jáltipan =

Municipality in Veracruz, Mexico

- Municipality
- Coat of arms

- Location in Mexico Jáltipan (Mexico)
- Country: Mexico
- State: Veracruz
- Demonym: (in Spanish)
- Time zone: UTC−6 (CST)

Jáltipan is a municipality in the Mexican state of Veracruz.

== Geography ==
The municipality is located in the southern part of the state, about 380 km from Xalapa, the state capital. It has a surface of 331.48 km^{2}. It is located at 17°58′N 94°43′W.

The municipality of Jáltipan is delimited to the north by Chinameca, to the east by Oteapan, Zaragoza, Cosoleacaque and Hidalgotitlán, and to the west by Texistepec and Soconusco.

The weather in Jáltipan is warm all year with rains in summer and autumn.

== Products ==
It produces principally maize, beans, rice, and oranges.

== Culture ==
In February the town holds a celebration in honor of Virgen de la Candelaria, patron saint of the town.

== History ==
The town was severely damaged during an earthquake in 1959.

== Transportation ==
Since 22 February 2024, Jaltipan has been the site of a Tren Interoceánico station.

Preceding station	Tren Interoceánico	Following station
Medias Aguas toward Salina Cruz	Line Z	Coatzacoalcos Terminus
