= Matías Romero railway station =

Railway station in Matías Romero, Mexico

Coordinates: 16°52′43″N 95°02′35″W

Matías Romero
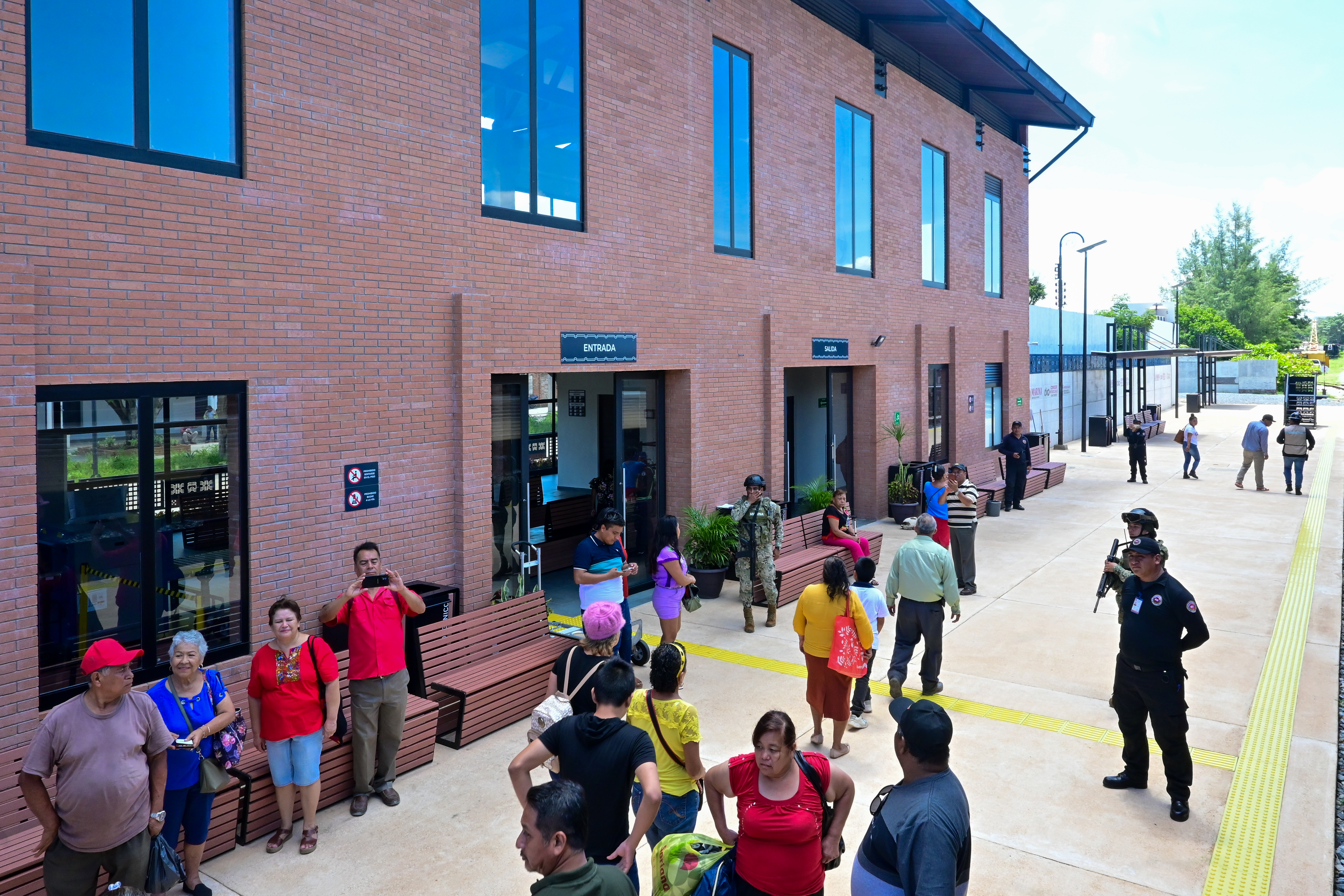
- Platform and new building of the station.

General information
- Location: Matías Romero, Oaxaca, Mexico
- Platforms: 1
- Tracks: 5

History
- Opened: October 15, 1894 (originally); June 2024 (reopening)

Services
Preceding station	Tren Interoceánico	Following station
Chivela toward Salina Cruz	Line Z	Mogoñé toward Coatzacoalcos
Future services
Lagunas toward Ixtepec	Tehuanito North	Mogoñé toward Ubero
Location

Matías Romero is a train station in Matías Romero, Oaxaca, Mexico.

== History ==
The station was originally opened on October 15, 1894, with the name Rincón Antonio. The station was constructed to serve the Ferrocarril Transístmico.

The line would later be reopened on December 22, 2023, although it is reported that the station itself was only 30% complete, because a week prior, the workers there suspended their work, due to the construction company not paying their wages for the month.

As of December 22, 2023, the station is expected to reopen in June 2024. In March 2024, the renovation of the station by SEDATU was completed.

== Characteristics ==
The station has a metal structure, under fire-proof brick masonry brought from the Carnegie foundries. The station was on the ground floor of the general office building, which also housed the traffic superintendent's office, dispatchers' offices, and a restaurant. In the attic, between the pillars of the framework, there were rooms for guests.
