= Jesús Carranza railway station =

Railway station in Veracruz, Mexico

Coordinates: 17.4356°N 95.0237°W

Jesús Carranza
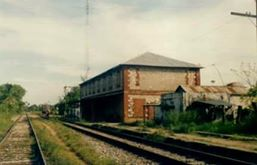
- Exterior of the old station

General information
- Location: Jesús Carranza, Veracruz, Mexico.
- Platforms: 1
- Tracks: 2

History
- Opened: June 29, 1894 (originally); December 22, 2023 (reopening)
- Rebuilt: August 1-December 22, 2023

Services
Preceding station	Tren Interoceánico	Following station
Donají toward Salina Cruz	Line Z	Medias Aguas toward Coatzacoalcos

Jesús Carranza station is a train station in Jesús Carranza, Veracruz.

== History ==
The original station was built on June 29, 1894, as part of the Ferrocarril Transístmico that connected the Pacific Ocean with the Atlantic Ocean.

In 2017, due to the Chiapas earthquake, the old station building suffered damage to most of the structure, leaving it almost completely destroyed.

However, the rehabilitation work of the station began on August 1, 2023, and is expected to last 120 days. The new station will serve passenger trains on the rehabilitated Ferrocarril Transístmico, as part of the Interoceanic Corridor of the Isthmus of Tehuantepec. On December 22, 2023, that year, the station was reopened.
