= Universidad Istmo Americana F.C. =

Mexican football club

Universidad Istmo Americana F.C
- Full name: Universidad Istmo Americana Fútbol Club
- Nickname(s): Universidad
- Founded: 2005
- Ground: Universitario, Coatzacoalcos, Veracruz
- Capacity: 1,000
- Chairman: José Enrique Gamboa
- Manager: Humberto Andrade Martínez
- League: Tercera División de México
Home colours	Away colours

Universidad Istmo Americana F.C. is a Mexican football club that plays in the Tercera División de México. The club is based in Coatzacoalcos, Veracruz. The club represents the Universidad Istmo Americana F.C.

== See also ==
- Football in Mexico
- Veracruz
- Tercera División de México
