= Pino Suárez railway station (Chiapas) =

Railway station in Chiapas, Mexico

Coordinates: 17.5572°N 92.3460°W

Pino Suárez

General information
- Other names: Salto de Agua
- Location: Salto de Agua, Chiapas, Mexico
- Platforms: 2
- Tracks: 2

History
- Opened: September 2024 (current station)

Services
Preceding station	Tren Interoceánico	Following station
Teapa toward Coatzacoalcos	Line FA	Pakal Ná (Palenque) toward Pakal Ná (Palenque)
Location

Salto de Agua railway station (Spanish: Estación de Salto de Agua), also known since 2024 as the Pino Suárez railway station, is a train station in Salto de Agua, Chiapas.

== History ==
The station is located on the Coatzacoalcos-Mérida Line. The construction of the station was approved by a presidential agreement in July 1934. The station was constructed in late 1935 by the Ferrocarriles Unidos del Sureste.
