= Pakal Ná railway station =

Railway station in Chiapas, Mexico

Pakal Ná
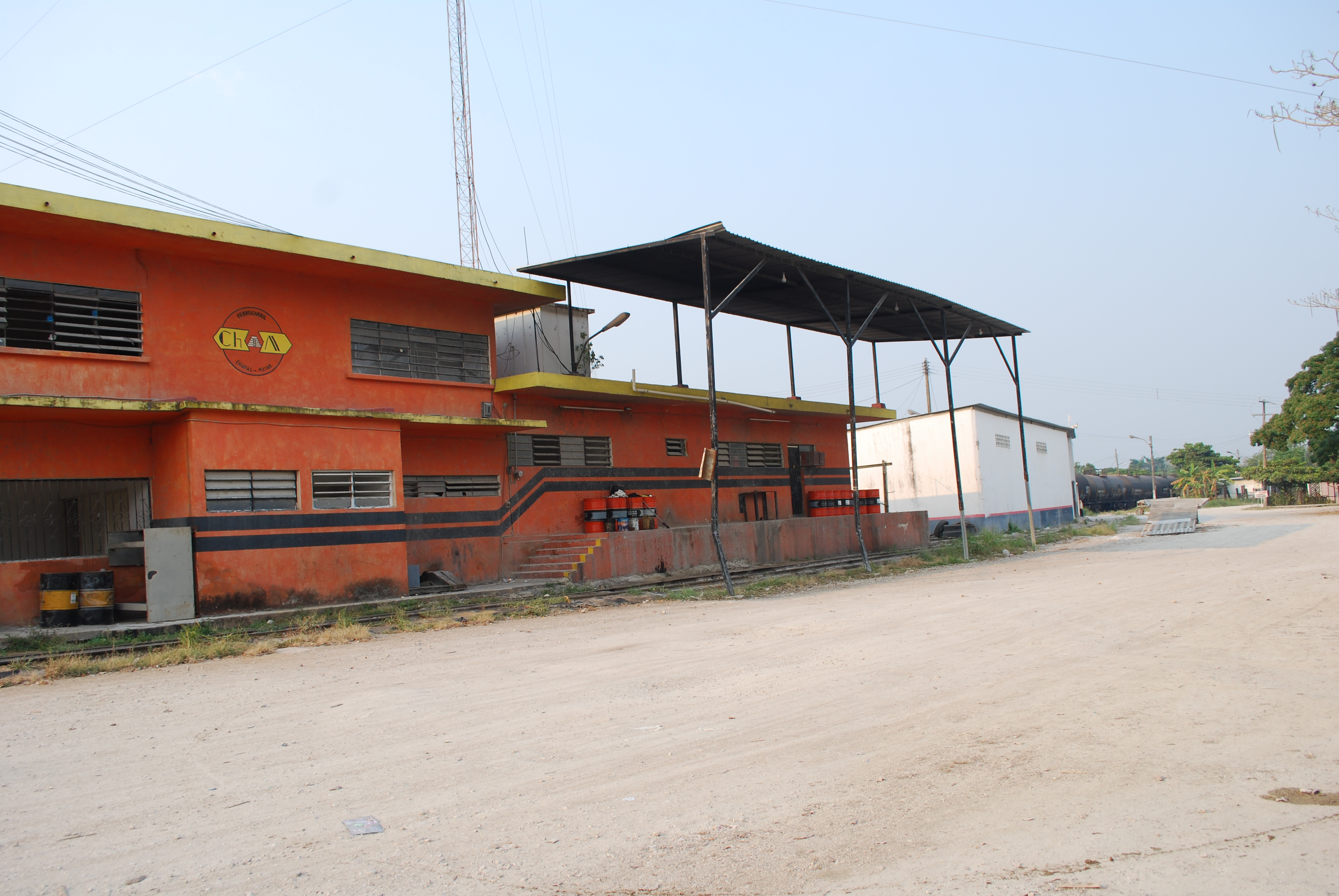
- Station building in 2011 prior to renovation.

General information
- Location: Pakal Ná, Palenque; Chiapas; Mexico
- Coordinates: 17.543025°N 91.989411°W
- Line: Coatzacoalcos–Mérida railway line
- Platforms: 1
- Tracks: 2

Construction
- Structure type: At-grade

History
- Rebuilt: September 13, 2024

Services
Preceding station	Tren Interoceánico	Following station
Salto de Agua toward Coatzacoalcos	Line FA	Terminus
Location

Pakal Ná (Spanish: Estación de Pakal Ná) is a railway station in Palenque Municipality, Chiapas, Mexico. It is located on the Coatzacoalcos–Mérida railway line. Since the completion of modernization works in 2024, it is the terminus for Tren Interoceánico services from Coatzacoalcos.

The station is one of two in the Palenque area, the other being Palenque railway station served by Tren Maya.
