= Line Z (Tren Interoceánico) =

Railway line in Mexico

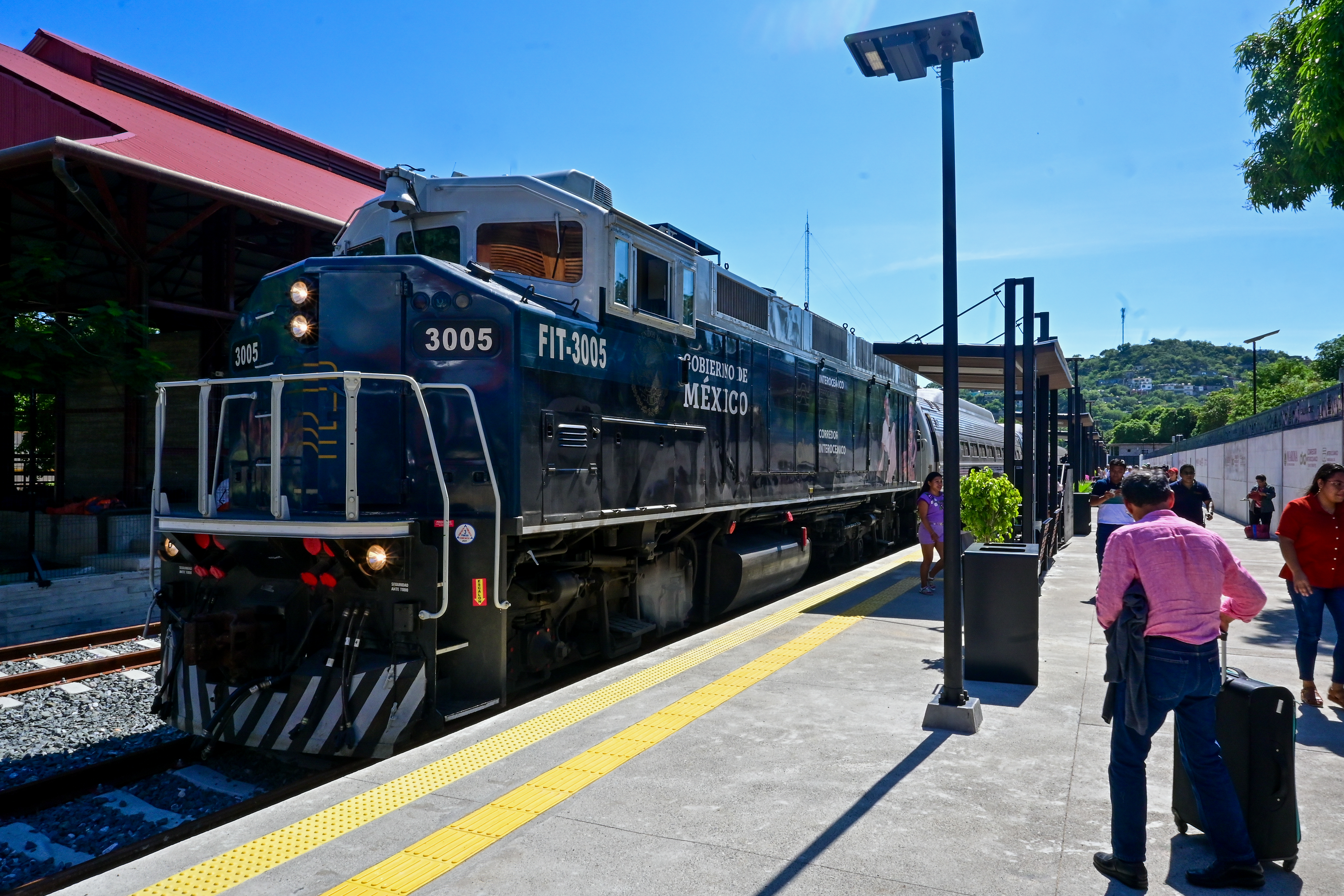
- EMD F59PH locomotive at Salina Cruz station, Oaxaca, Mexico.

Overview
- Other names: Trans-Isthmus Railway; Tehuantepec Railway
- Native name: Línea Z
- Owner: Federal government of Mexico
- Locale: Isthmus of Tehuantepec
- Termini: Coatzacoalcos; Salina Cruz
- Stations: 10
- Website: www.pasajerosinteroceanico.com.mx

Service
- Type: Regional rail; Freight rail
- Operators: Ferrocarril del Istmo de Tehuantepec; Ferrosur (Medias Aguas–Coatzacoalcos)
- Rolling stock: EMD SD70M; EMD F59PH; Amfleet; Stadler Citylink; British Rail Class 43; British Rail Mark 3

History
- Opened: September 2023 (freight); 22 December 2023 (passenger)

Technical
- Line length: 308 km (191 mi)
- Number of tracks: 1
- Track gauge: 1,435 mm (4 ft 8 1/2 in) standard gauge

Line Z (Spanish: Línea Z) is a main line operated by Ferrocarril del Istmo de Tehuantepec connecting Coatzacoalcos and Salina Cruz on the Interoceanic Corridor of the Isthmus of Tehuantepec. It is leased to Ferrosur.

== History ==
The potential of the route from the Atlantic to the Pacific across the Isthmus of Tehuantepec has long been appreciated. As early as 1814 the Spanish government authorized a canal across the Isthmus. Soon after Mexico became independent in 1821, surveys were carried out which recommended constructing a plank trail for wagons through the Chivela Pass, with the northernmost part of the route using the Coatzacoalcos River which flows northward to the Gulf of Mexico on the Atlantic side of the isthmus. The river would be dredged to allow navigation. Nothing came of either of these plans.

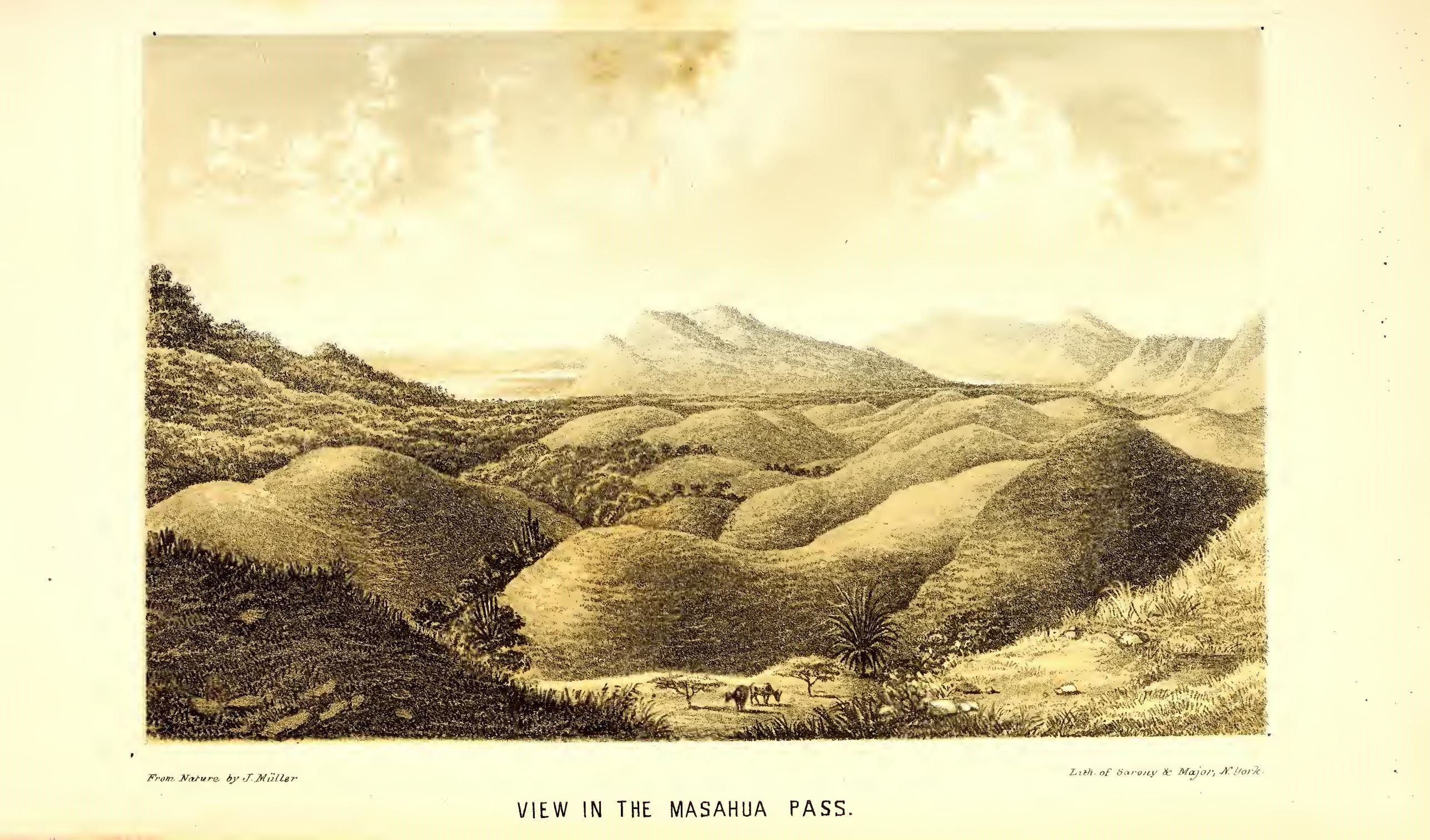
An illustration from Barnard's Survey of the Tehuantepec route.

More serious planning began in the early 1840s, when José de Garay, the First Officer of the Ministry of War obtained a concession on the route and carried out a more thorough survey. After many failed attempts to obtain funding, the concession was taken over by a New Orleans company, The Tehuantepec Railroad Company of New Orleans (TRCNO). Despite diplomatic problems over the status of the concession, a further survey of the route was carried out by Major John G. Barnard. This was published in 1852.

The years between 1852 and 1861 were turbulent both diplomatically and financially. The opening of the Panama Railroad in 1854 provided competition for the Tehuantepec route, but also gave warning that the TRNCO's cost estimates were wildly optimistic. The Panic of 1857 made raising capital for transportation projects more difficult. There were disputes over the concession with the Mexican Government. In spite of this, the company managed to construct a wagon trail (not a railroad) along the route, and offer a service for passengers and mail from New Orleans to San Francisco, starting in 1858. It was too little too late, however, and the company became insolvent in 1860. The outbreak of the American Civil War and the French intervention in Mexico the following year ended any immediate hope of reviving the project.

After the Civil War ended, there was once again interest in trans-isthmus routes, in particular for a canal. A commission was appointed by the US Government in 1872. A new survey of the Tehuantepec route had been carried out by Admiral R. W. Shufeldt in 1870, but in spite of his positive report the commission recommended a route through Nicaragua in 1876. No government action resulted, however, and actual canal construction was started in Panama in 1881 by a French company headed by Ferdinand de Lesseps.

A radically different solution was proposed by James B. Eads - a ship-railway. Rather than a canal, he proposed a 6-track railway across the isthmus, with ships of up to 6,000 tons carried in a specially designed cradle. Eads' ideas received considerable support in the USA, but he died in 1887, and this was effectively the end of the proposal.

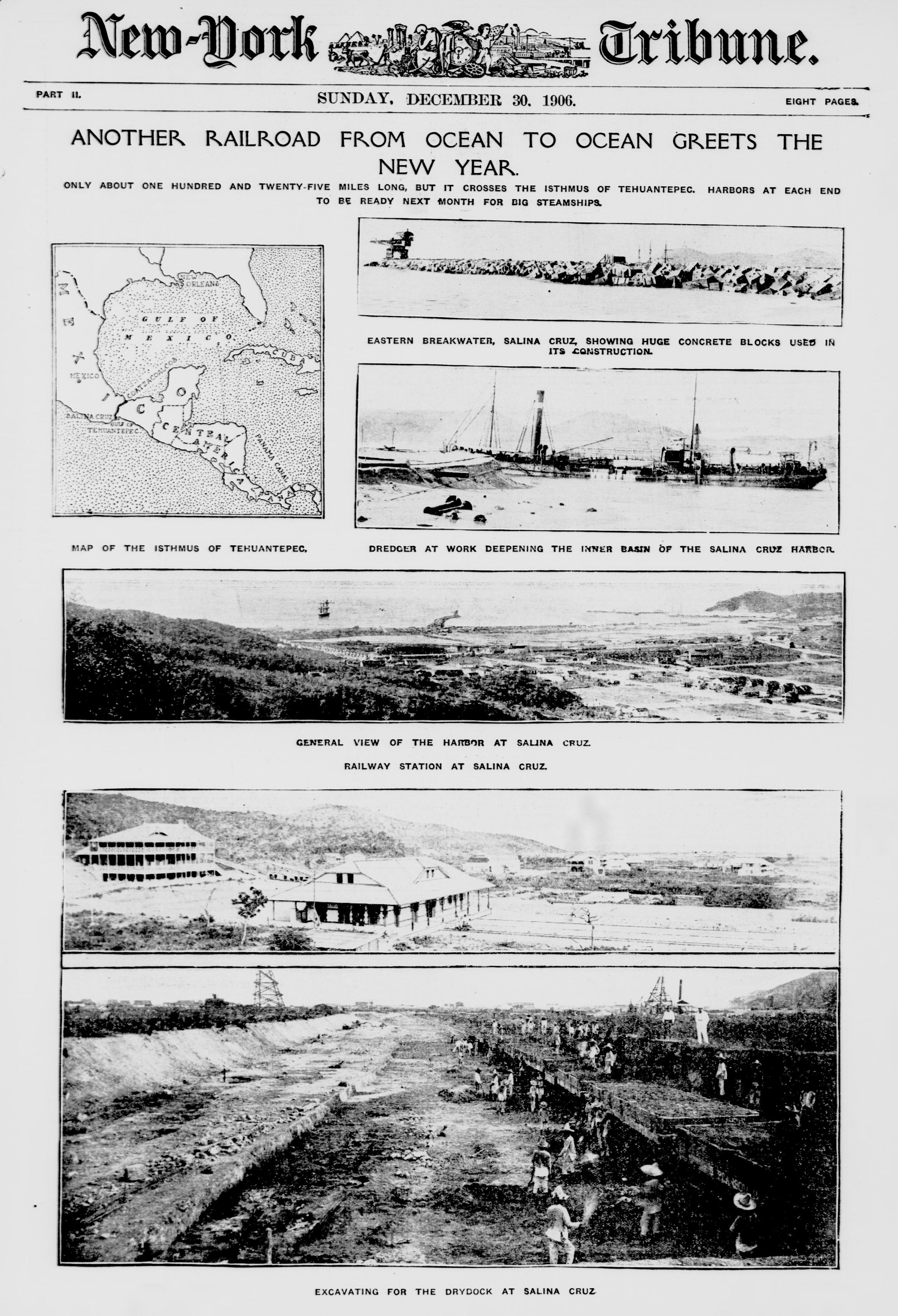
Newspaper report of the completion of the Tehuantepac Railroad.

Railroad construction actually continued during this period, and the line was completed in 1894. It had many problems, including inadequate port facilities at each end, and varying standards of construction along the route. It soon became clear that a complete overhaul was necessary, and Weetman D. Pearson was contracted by the Mexican Government to undertake the work. The line was stabilized, and where necessary structures were rebuilt. Port facilities were established at Coatzacoalcos and Salina Cruz. The newly refurbished line opened in 1907. The locomotives on the line were oil-burning steam locomotives. The Tehuantepec Railroad was one of the first to use this source of power.

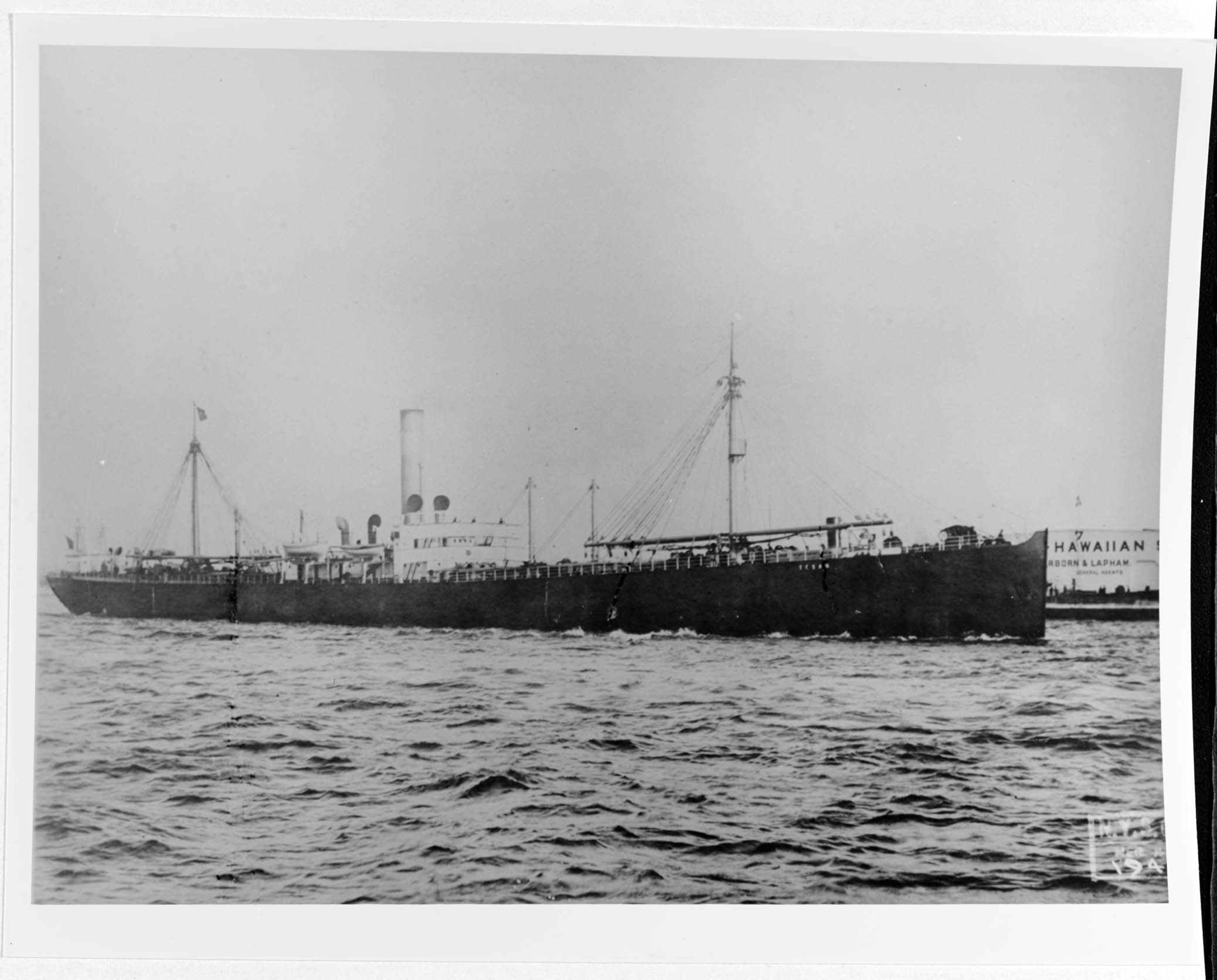
SS Texan, one of the freighters used on the Tehuantepec route

The American-Hawaiian Steamship Company, which had been operating from San Francisco and Hawaii to New York through the Straits of Magellan contracted to provide connecting steamship lines to both ends of the railroad, allowing a 25 day service between San Francisco and New York. Sugar became a major part of the freight, amounting to 250,000 tons annually, and most of the sugar from Hawaii to Philadelphia and New York was carried on this route.

The railroad prospered for seven years, until the Panama Canal opened in 1914. Despite optimistic forecasts that there was plenty of business for both the railroad and the canal, business declined drastically after 1914, not helped by the Mexican Revolution and the onset of the First World War. The railroad continued to handle substantial passenger traffic well into the fifties, but ceased to be a significant carrier of freight.

=== Redevelopment ===
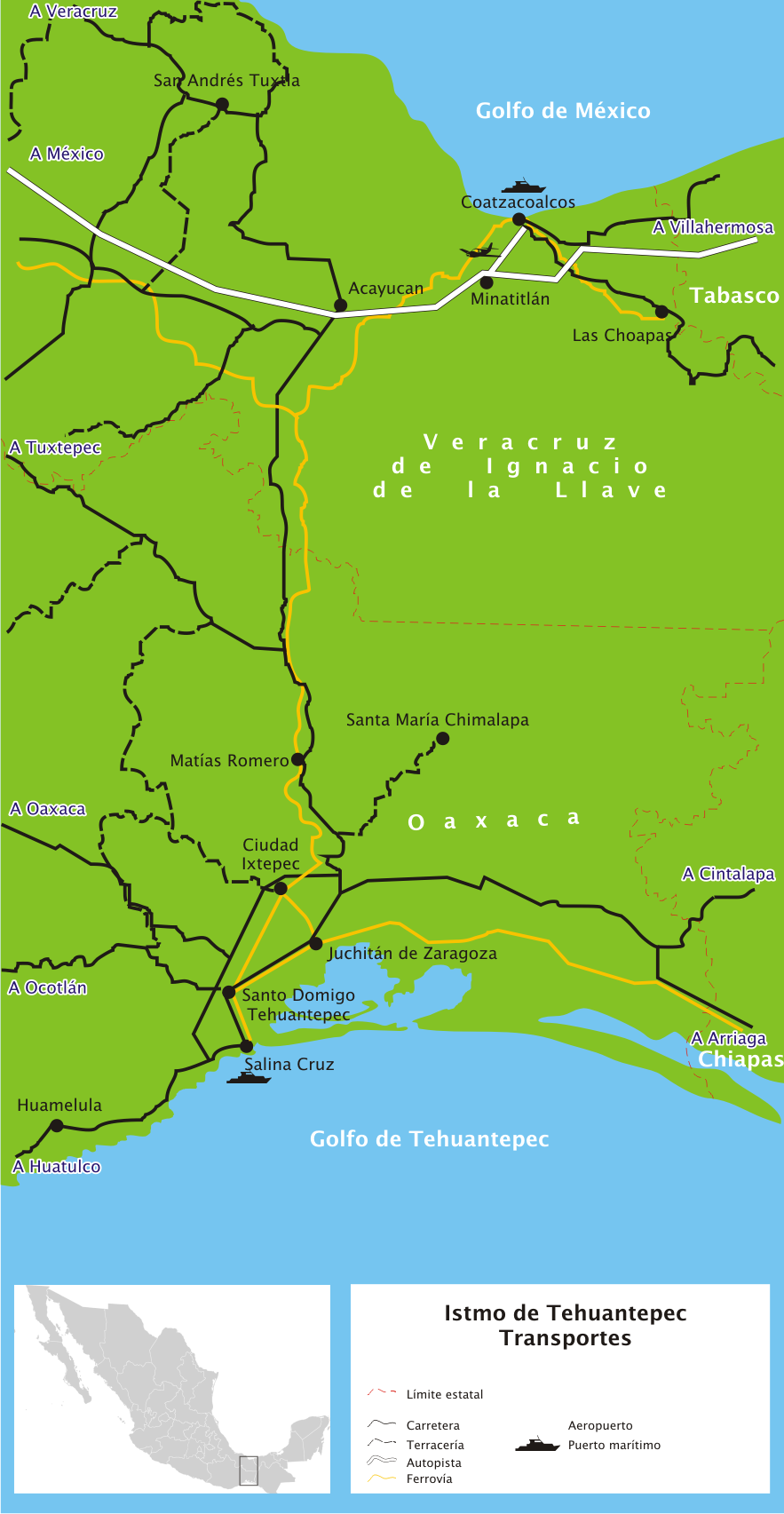
Transport routes in the Isthmus of Tehuantepec. This map shows roads and ports, as well as the railroad; the map legend is in Spanish.

On 7 June 2020, Mexican president Andrés Manuel López Obrador announced the beginning of the rehabilitation of the line. It will cost 3 billion pesos to begin the project, but in total, the project will cost 20 billion pesos.

The project for the rehabilitation of the line will result in the speed of freight trains increasing from 20 kilometres per hour (12 mph) to 70 kilometres per hour (43 mph), more than three times the current speed. Furthermore, this project will also lead to the introduction of a passenger train, which will be able to reach speeds of up to 80 kilometres per hour (50 mph).

It will also enable links to existing freight lines, including the Coatzacoalcos–Palenque and Chiapas–Veracruz lines, as well as another railway line, the Ixtepec–Ciudad Hidalgo Line, that extends from the Interoceanic Corridor of the Isthmus of Tehuantepec (CIIT, by its initials in Spanish) to the city of Tapachula, in Chiapas.

The work includes the application of aluminum-thermal welding on rails, application of paint on bridges and structures, dismantling, weeding, and cleaning of ditches. This will be done through the work of crews of personnel for the railroad, and through the hiring of private companies.

The Medias Aguas–Salina Cruz section of the passenger railway performed its first tests in September 2023, including an official trip by the President and his staff, and the director of the CIIT, vice admiral Raymundo Morales Ángeles, stated that it will begin passenger operation in December, though cargo operations did officially begin in September. This opening includes 227 rehabilitated kilometers of roads (out of 308 total kilometers between Coatzacoalcos and Salina Cruz), 82 bridges and 290 drainage works. The modernization of this section, known as Line Z (Spanish: Línea Z), includes complementary works such as nine passenger stations, seven slopes, two supply stations, seven workshops, four yards, a single control and dispatch center, and two depots.

On 22 December 2023, the passenger train service on Line Z from Coatzacoalcos to Salina Cruz was inaugurated. Raymundo Morales Ángeles reported that the historic stations in Salina Cruz, Ixtepec, Mogoñé, and Medias Aguas, as well as the new stations in Chivela and Donají, were opened. However, in June 2024, the second stage of Line Z will open. Matías Romero railway station will reopen then, while the new stations will also open: Coatzacoalcos, Jáltipan, Jesús Carranza, Ubero, Sarabia, Lagunas, Nizanda, Comitancillo and Tehuantepec.

== Accident ==
On December 28, 2025, a train derailed at Asunción Ixtaltepec in Oaxaca. 13 people dead and around 100 more injured. The Attorney General's Office reported that the cause of the derailment was excessive speed when passing through the curve.

== Rolling stock ==
On 13 August 2023, ex-Union Pacific SD70M locomotives were presented that would be used for the train. These locomotives would later be joined by ex-GO Transit GMD F59PH locomotives from RAILEXCO. The Tren Interoceánico also purchased eight passenger coaches from the Railway Excursion Management Company (Railexco), including a dome car named the Stampede Pass, two ex-Amtrak Amfleet coaches, and five Budd SPV-2000 coaches.

On 26 August 2023, the Stadler Citylink trains from the former Puebla–Cholula Tourist Train arrived at Coatzacoalcos railway station for use on the train.

In addition, the Mexican government bought 8 special wagons (including two Amfleet coaches) from the Railway Excursion Management Company (Railexco). They also bought three British Rail Class 43 locomotives and 11 British Rail Mark 3 coaches, which reached the port of Coatzacoalcos on the ship ARKHANGELSK. The purchased HSTs weigh 70.25 tons and 17.79 meters (58 feet) of length each,as well as wagons of 38.18 tons and 23 m (75' 5 _{^{1/2}} ") in length.

== See also ==
- Line FA (Tren Interoceánico), another line to be operated by Tren Interoceánico
- Line K (Tren Interoceánico), another line to be operated by Tren Interoceánico
- American-Hawaiian Steamship Company
- Ferrocarril de Veracruz al Istmo
- List of Mexican railroads
