= Coatzacoalcos Underwater Tunnel =

Tunnel under the Coatzacoalcos River in Veracruz, Mexico

Túnel Sumergido Coatzacoalcos
Overview
- Location: Coatzacoalcos-Villa de Allende, Veracruz
- Coordinates: 18.145299°N 94.408150°W

Operation
- Opened: April 27, 2017
- Owner: Government of the State of Veracruz
- Operator: IDEAL
- Traffic: Automotive
- Character: Highway

Technical
- Length: 0.68 miles (1.1 km)
- No. of lanes: 4
- Water Depth: 21 meters

The Coatzacoalcos Underwater Tunnel is a tunnel under the Coatzacoalcos River, connecting the cities of Coatzacoalcos and Villa de Allende in the Mexican state of Veracruz. The tunnel was formally opened on April 27, 2017, making it the first undersea tunnel in Mexico, after a 13-year construction process characterized by delays and increased costs, for which it has been described as a "monument to corruption". It is operated by a subsidiary of IDEAL, a company controlled by Carlos Slim.

== History ==
=== Existing river crossings ===
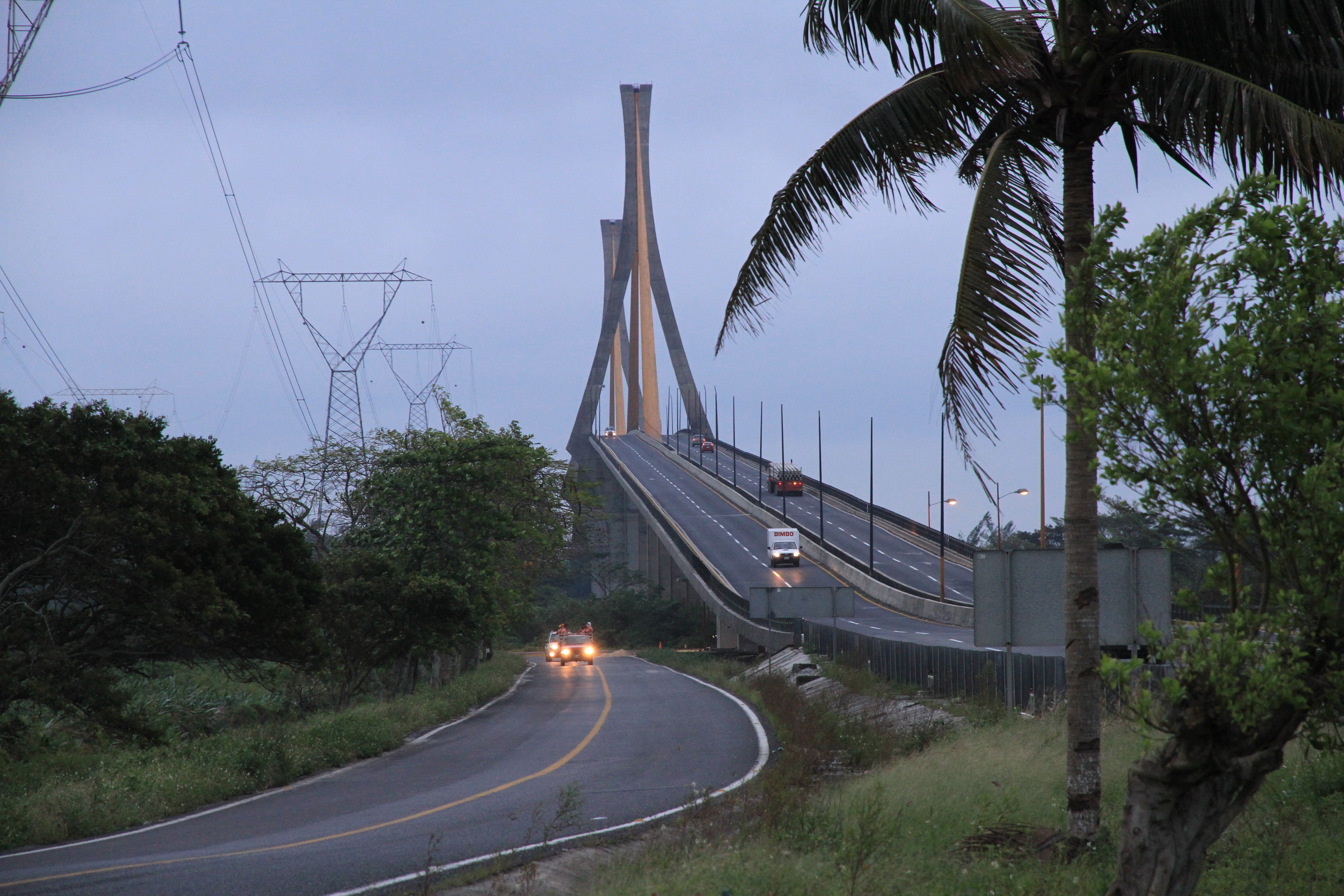
The western approach to the Coatzacoalcos II bridge, the second crossing of the Coatzacoalcos River

With the development of petrochemical complexes on the east bank of the river, the two existing crossings were insufficient for traffic. The first crossing to open was the Coatzacoalcos I bridge, which carries two-lane Mexican Federal Highway 180 and a rail line across the river and opened on March 18, 1962. In 1984, the four-lane Coatzacoalcos II bridge, formally named the Puente Ing. Antonio Dovalí Jaime (Coatzacoalcos II), opened to traffic on the mainline of Mexican Federal Highway 180D; this bridge, built 12 kilometres (7.5 mi) to the south, primarily serves to carry traffic bypassing the city. With just one two-lane local bridge connecting the cities of Coatzacoalcos and Villa de Allende, a third and higher-capacity river crossing was needed.

=== Awarding and construction ===
In 2004, the state government of Veracruz selected a consortium led by Spanish company Fomento de Construcciones y Contratas (FCC Construcción), known as Concesionaria Túnel de Coatzacoalcos, S.A. de C.V., to receive the concession to build the tunnel and operate it for 30 years, with a special 15-year extension added after. The project was originally budgeted for 2.065 billion pesos and scheduled to open in 2010.

Construction was heavily delayed for several reasons. At the start, the state government failed to apply for the proper permits; as construction got going, delays started to become evident, while the state government was being billed for higher quality raw materials than those being used. At times, the contractors were not being paid for materials, causing further delays. By the time Fidel Herrera, who governed Veracruz from 2004 to 2010, left office, the project was already a "white elephant".

During the six-year term of Javier Duarte as Governor of Veracruz, the Superior Auditor of the Federation (Auditoría Superior de la Federación or ASF), the federal agency responsible for conducting audits, as well as its state counterpart (ORFIS), signaled the project each year for diversion of resources, and it warned that the project failed to comply with state planning policies and was being built below standards. Pecuniary losses soared into the hundreds of millions of pesos. Despite this, the state government continued to plow public resources into the project. In 2013, halfway through Duarte's term, the state Secretary of Infrastructure and Public Works, Gerardo Buganza, asked the state legislature to authorize Carlos Slim to inject additional resources into the project, asking them to "have faith" that the tunnel would be completed by the end of the state administration in 2016; while the deputies approved the project, the tunnel yet again missed a deadline. Indeed, that same year, construction ground to a halt for what would become two years, and cracked concrete and rusting metal were visible on the worksite. Nationally, the tunnel was generating comparisons to another project marked by delays and cost increases, Line 12 of the Mexico City Metro.

During construction, workers uncovered artifacts from Olmec settlements in Villa de Allende dating from 1200 to 400 BCE and in smaller amounts on the Coatzacoalcos side of the project. Twenty archeologists from the Instituto Nacional de Antropología e Historia spent two months on site. Among the items later exhibited were counterweights used for fishing nets, pots, and human figures.

=== Opening and operation ===
The Coatzacoalcos Underwater Tunnel opened with a formal dedication on April 27, 2017, at a cost of 5.398 billion pesos — a 256% increase over the original budget. Speaking at the dedication, Governor Miguel Ángel Yunes Linares suggested that the tunnel be known as the Túnel Puerto México, in honor of one of the former names of Coatzacoalcos. A piece of concrete fell from the ceiling of the eastbound (Coatzacoalcos-Allende) tunnel during the 2017 Chiapas earthquake.

Local residents have presented several complaints about the tunnel. In Villa Allende, residents blocked the access road to the tunnel and threatened to sabotage the event if insurers did not visit homes in the area that they claimed were damaged during construction.

== Tunnel ==
The Coatzacoalcos Tunnel carries four lanes of traffic under the Coatzacoalcos River, providing a third crossing of the river. The 1.1 km (0.68 mi) tunnel is 25 metres (82 ft) wide and dips to 21 metres (69 ft) below the river at its lowest point. The tunnel was built with the immersed tube method in order to reduce impact on urban areas; nearly 700 metres (2,300 ft) of the tunnel was prefabricated and installed on site. Cemex provided 48,000 cubic metres (63,000 cu yd) of concrete for the project, including structural elements and pavement. Combined with the access ramps, the road is 2.8 kilometres (1.7 mi) in length.

The tunnel also features 18 ventilators to control the temperature and humidity, as well as lighting, carbon monoxide and smoke detection and closed-circuit cameras.

Currently, users are tolled on the Villa Allende side of the tunnel.
