= Estación Sarabia =

Mexican town

Coordinates: 17.068°N 95.026°W

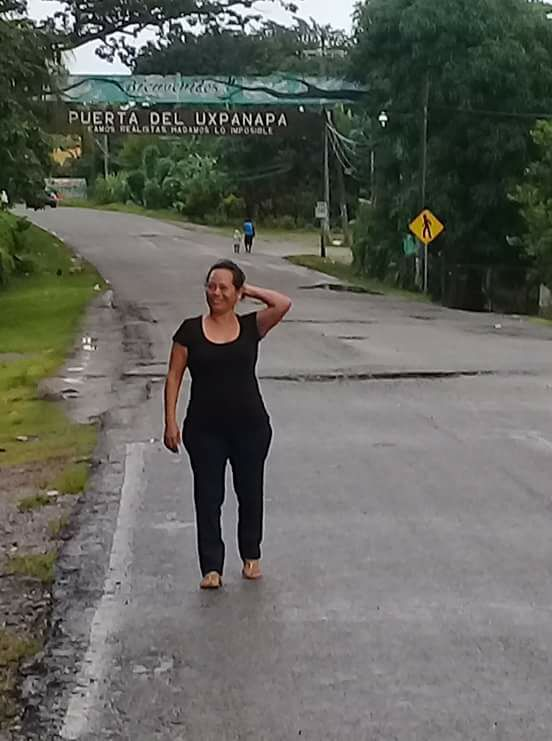
La puerta del Uxpanapa en Estacion Zarabia

Estacion Sarabia (Boca del Monte) is a town in Oaxaca, Mexico, located between Palomares and Matías Romero in the municipality of San Juan Guichicovi. It has 1,021 inhabitants, 492 men and 529 women (Census 2010), and 42.41% of the local population speaks an indigenous language. The town is located 120 above sea level and is nicknamed "The Door to the Uxpanapa" because it is the main entrance to the municipality of Uxpanapa.
