= Palenque Municipality =

- Municipality
- Location of the municipality in Chiapas.
- Coordinates: 17°26′N 91°48′W
- Country: Mexico
- State: Chiapas
- Municipal Seat: Palenque
- Created: 1915

Government
  - Municipal President: Jorge Cabrera Aguilar (2021—2024)

Area (2020)
  - Total: 2,888 km^{2} (1,115 sq mi)
- Elevation (Median): 92 m (302 ft)

Population (2020)
  - Total: 132,265
  - Density: 45.8/km^{2} (119/sq mi)
- Time zone: UTC-6 (Central (US Central))
- Postal code: 29960—29969
- Area code: 916
- Website: http://www.palenque.gob.mx/

Palenque Municipality is a municipality in Chiapas in south Mexico.

== Neighboring municipalities ==
Neighboring municipalities are Catazajá to the north, La Libertad to the east, Ocosingo and Chilón to the south, Salto de Agua to the west, and the other Mexican stat – Tabasco to the north and east, and country Guatemala to the southeast.

== Localities ==
There are 683 localities, the largest of which are:

Code INEGI	Locality	Population
065	Total Municipality	132,265
0001	Palenque	51,797
0105	Río Chancalá	2,236
0182	Agua Blanca Serranía	1,726
0047	El Edén	1,467
0191	Arimatea	1,385
