= Matías Romero, Oaxaca =

Matías Romero
- Municipality and town
- Location in Mexico
- Coordinates: 16°52′37″N 95°02′28″W
- Country: Mexico
- State: Oaxaca

Area
  - Total: 1,459.54 km^{2} (563.53 sq mi)

Population (2005)
  - Total: 38,421
- Time zone: UTC-6 (Central Standard Time)
- Postal code: 70300 (Centro)
- Area code: 972

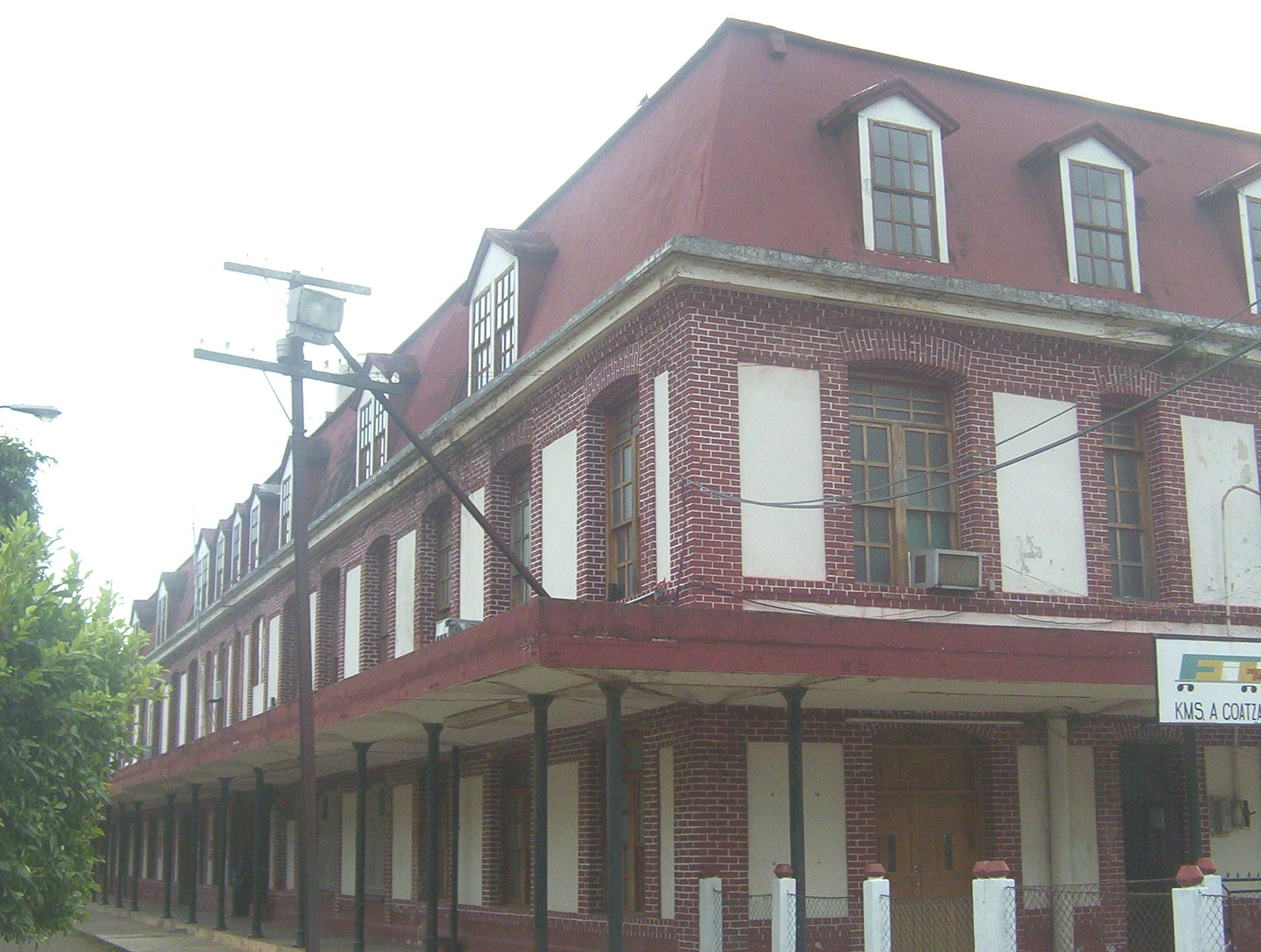
Matías Romero station, the landmark of Matias Romero

Matías Romero is a town and municipality in Oaxaca in south-western Mexico. It is named after Mexican politician and diplomat Matías Romero Avendaño. The municipality covers an area of 1,459.54 km^{2}. It is part of the Juchitán District in the west of the Istmo de Tehuantepec region. El Rio Corte in Colonia Cuauhtemoc is a popular tourist spot, wide and with excellent beaches.

As of 2005, the municipality had a total population of 38,421.

== History ==
=== 2017 Earthquake ===
According to the US Geological Survey, early on September 23, 2017, a magnitude 6.1 earthquake struck 12 miles southeast of Matías Romero. The epicenter was approximately between the centers of the two more violent earthquakes seen earlier in the month. On September 8, an 8.1 magnitude quake had struck off of the southern Pacific coast, near Chiapas state. Mexico City, on September 19, then endured a 7.1 magnitude quake, which also marked the 32nd anniversary of the devastating 1985 earthquake, in which more than 10,000 people had been killed.

=== 2020 to present ===
Municipal President Alfredo Juárez died in 2020 during the COVID-19 pandemic in Mexico.
