= Coatzacoalcos =

- City and municipality
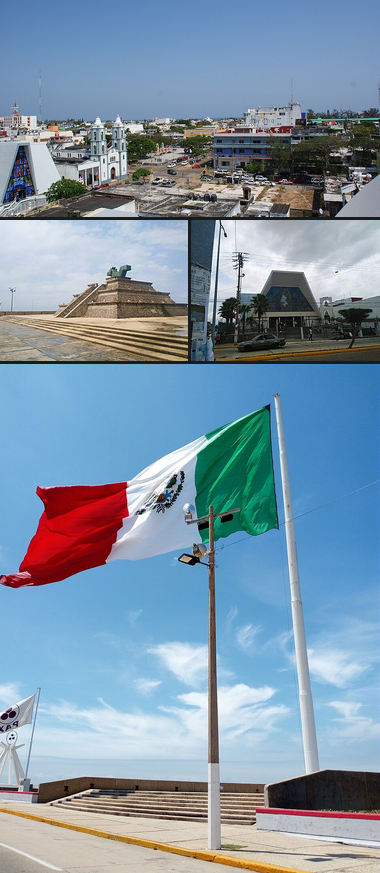
- Top: Panoramic view of Coatzacoalcos Middle: Olmec Archaeology Museum, Cathedral of Saint Joseph Bottom: National flag at the seafront

- Seal
- Nickname: La Ciudad de las Avenidas ('The City of Avenues')
- Location in Mexico Coatzacoalcos (Mexico)
- Coordinates: 18°08′29″N 94°26′04″W
- Country: Mexico
- State: Veracruz
- Region: Olmeca Region
- Municipality: Coatzacoalcos
- Founded: 1522

Government
  - Municipal president: Amado Jesús Cruz Malpica MORENA

Area
  - Municipality: 309.2 km^{2} (119.4 sq mi)
- Highest elevation: 50 m (160 ft)
- Lowest elevation: 0 m (0 ft)

Population (2020)
  - Municipality: 310,698 (3rd in Veracruz)
  - Density: 1,000/km^{2} (2,600/sq mi)
  - Seat: 212,540
  - Metro: 354,606
  - Metro density: 714.64/km^{2} (1,850.9/sq mi)
- Time zone: UTC−6 (CST)
- Postal code: 96380–96599
- Area code: 921
- Website: www.coatzacoalcos.gob.mx(in Spanish)

Coatzacoalcos (Spanish: [koatsakoˈalkos]; formerly known as Puerto México; Nahuatl languages: Koatzakwalko; Zapotec: Niniashi; Popoluca: Puertu) is a major port city in the southern part of the Mexican state of Veracruz, mostly on the western side of the Coatzacoalcos River estuary, on the Bay of Campeche, on the southern Gulf of Mexico coast. The city serves as the municipal seat of the municipality of the same name. The city had a 2020 census population of 212,540, making it the third-largest city in the state after Veracruz and Xalapa. The municipality covers a surface area of 471.16 km^{2} (181.916 sq mi) and reported a population of 310,698 persons. The municipality population in 2015 was 319,187 a decrease of 9% over 2020.

== Etymology ==
Coatzacoalcos comes from a Nahuatl word meaning 'site of the Snake' or 'where the snake hides'. According to the legend, this is where the god Quetzalcoatl made his final journey to the sea in around 999 and promised to return.

== History ==
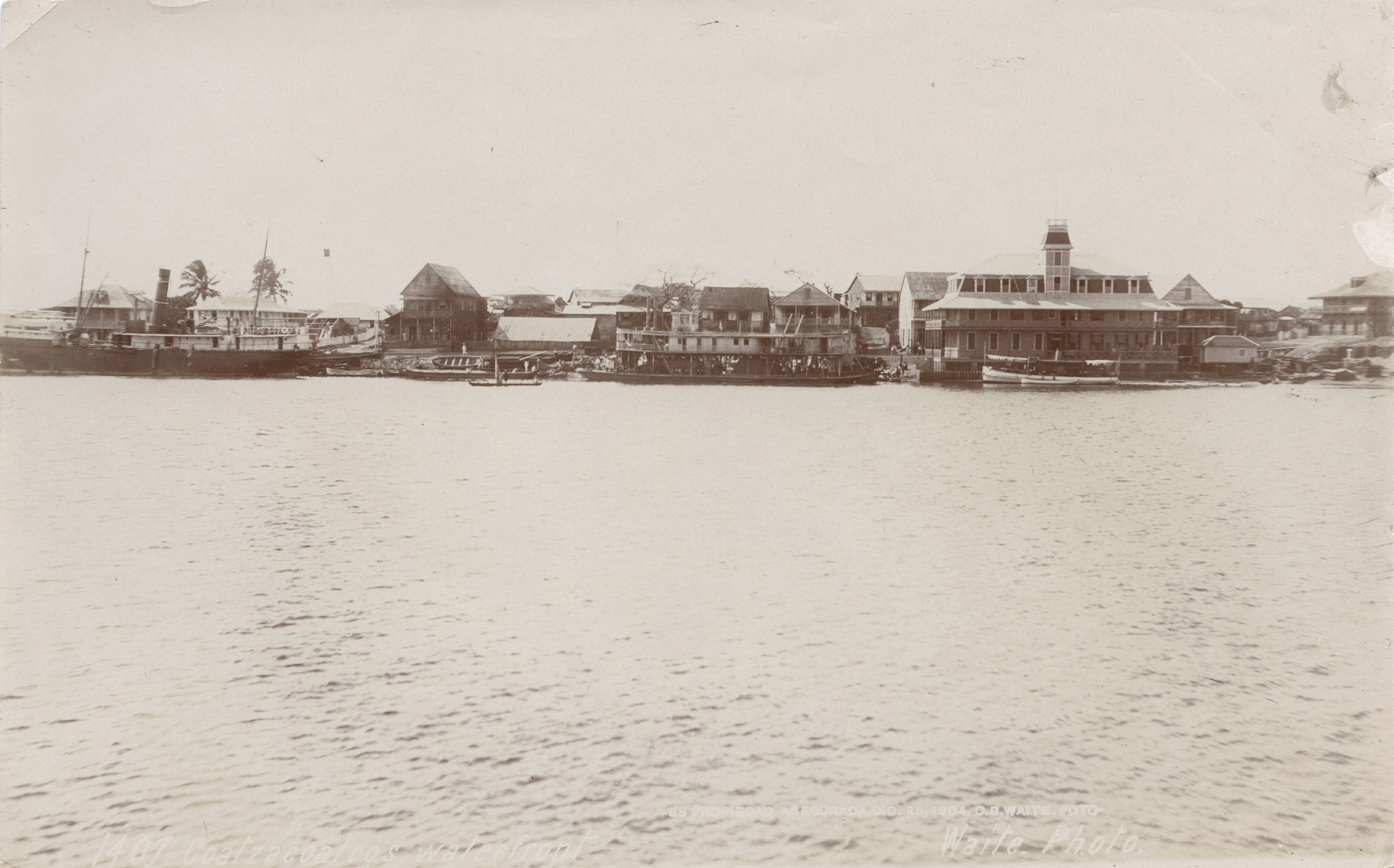
Coatzacoalcos waterfront, circa 1904

Coatzacoalcos sits within the Olmec heartland. Excavations in 2008 for a tunnel under the Coatzacoalcos River indicate a substantial pre-Hispanic population. By the time the Spanish arrived, Coatzacoalcos was an important center of regional trade and the capital of an extensive polity covering much of the modern Olmeca Region and perhaps reaching into the westernmost portions of the state of Tabasco. At some point there was a conflict with the Aztec garrison at Tuxtepec, and Aztec pochteca were later allowed safe passage in order to travel to Tabasco, though it never became an Aztec subject state. Nahuas were the predominant ethnicity, speaking the local Isthmus dialect, but the region was also inhabited by many Popolucas speaking Mixe-Zoque languages. Small Mixtec and Zapotec populations were reported in the Relaciones geográficas, but not much is known about them.

In 1522, Hernán Cortés ordered Gonzalo de Sandoval to fund a settlement near Guazacualco. Sandoval named it Villa del Espíritu Santo.

San Martín Tuxtla is an active volcano lying northwest of Coatzcoalcos in the Sierra de los Tuxtlas. It erupted in 1664, in May 1793 with large ash falls and lava flows, and most recently in 1796.

The town was elevated to the category of port in 1825 and the name was changed to Coatzacoalcos.

The municipality of Coatzacoalcos was established 22 December 1881, with the town as its seat. In 1900 the town name was changed to Puerto México. In 1911 it was elevated to city, and in 1936 the name was changed to the current Coatzacoalcos.

On 23 July 1940, Coatzacoalcos welcomed refugees from the Spanish Civil War who sought asylum in Mexico after travelling across the Atlantic aboard the SS Santo Domingo.

In 1959, the city suffered damage from an M_{w} 6.4 earthquake.

Coatzacoalcos became a very important crossroads during the oil boom of the 1970s, connecting the Yucatán Peninsula and oil fields in Campeche to the rest of Mexico and to the port of Salina Cruz in Oaxaca on the Pacific coast.

== Geography and climate ==
The city is located at 18°9′N 94°26′W where the Coatzacoalcos River debouches into the Bay of Campeche. Overland it is connected by road and rail to the Pacific Ocean about 160 kilometres (99 mi) away. This location has prompted plans for an interoceanic waterway across the Isthmus of Tehuantepec, or for a much expanded railroad system, for over a century.

In the Köppen climate classification the climate is classified as Am for a tropical monsoon climate. A typical year sees more than 290 centimetres (110 in) of rainfall. Lying on the Gulf of Mexico, Coatzacoalcos has been struck by several hurricanes and tropical storms such as Hurricane Diana in August 1990, Hurricane Mitch in November 1998, Tropical Storm Larry in October 2003, Hurricane Stan in October 2005, Hurricane Dean in August 2007, Tropical Storm Marco in October 2008, Tropical Storm Hermine in early September 2010, Hurricane Karl in mid September 2010, Tropical Storm Matthew in late September 2010, Hurricane Richard in October 2010 and Hurricane Agatha in late May 2022. The winter months are cooler and drier than the summer months. Occasionally, cold high pressure cells from North America drift south across the Gulf of Mexico and drive strong Tehuano winds across the Isthmus, with very strong wind concentration taking place in Chivela Pass in Oaxaca.

Climate data for Coatzacoalcos, Veracruz (1981–2000)
Month	Jan	Feb	Mar	Apr	May	Jun	Jul	Aug	Sep	Oct	Nov	Dec	Year
Record high °C (°F)	39.5 (103.1)	40.0 (104.0)	39.1 (102.4)	41.2 (106.2)	42.5 (108.5)	43.0 (109.4)	40.0 (104.0)	39.0 (102.2)	38.0 (100.4)	38.3 (100.9)	35.6 (96.1)	37.2 (99.0)	43.0 (109.4)
Mean daily maximum °C (°F)	25.6 (78.1)	26.6 (79.9)	28.9 (84.0)	31.0 (87.8)	32.1 (89.8)	31.8 (89.2)	30.6 (87.1)	30.8 (87.4)	30.3 (86.5)	29.0 (84.2)	28.0 (82.4)	26.2 (79.2)	29.2 (84.6)
Daily mean °C (°F)	22.6 (72.7)	23.6 (74.5)	25.3 (77.5)	27.3 (81.1)	28.6 (83.5)	28.4 (83.1)	27.1 (80.8)	27.8 (82.0)	27.3 (81.1)	26.2 (79.2)	25.2 (77.4)	23.5 (74.3)	26.1 (79.0)
Mean daily minimum °C (°F)	19.6 (67.3)	20.5 (68.9)	21.7 (71.1)	23.5 (74.3)	25.2 (77.4)	25.0 (77.0)	23.6 (74.5)	24.7 (76.5)	24.2 (75.6)	23.4 (74.1)	22.4 (72.3)	20.8 (69.4)	22.9 (73.2)
Record low °C (°F)	11.7 (53.1)	9.6 (49.3)	11.8 (53.2)	12.0 (53.6)	19.1 (66.4)	19.9 (67.8)	17.1 (62.8)	20.8 (69.4)	19.0 (66.2)	18.0 (64.4)	14.9 (58.8)	12.0 (53.6)	9.6 (49.3)
Average precipitation mm (inches)	95.1 (3.74)	58.2 (2.29)	46.1 (1.81)	48.4 (1.91)	155.2 (6.11)	234.8 (9.24)	268.2 (10.56)	311.0 (12.24)	506.2 (19.93)	364.6 (14.35)	265.8 (10.46)	223.6 (8.80)	2,577.1 (101.46)
Average precipitation days (≥ 0.1 mm)	11.0	6.3	4.6	4.7	5.1	12.9	14.9	19.1	19.9	14.1	12.6	11.6	136.6
Average relative humidity (%)	82	80	73	74	75	77	79	79	80	78	80	81	78
Mean monthly sunshine hours	132	143	192	211	209	195	199	199	166	159	147	123	2,075
Source: Servicio Meteorológico Nacional

== Economy ==
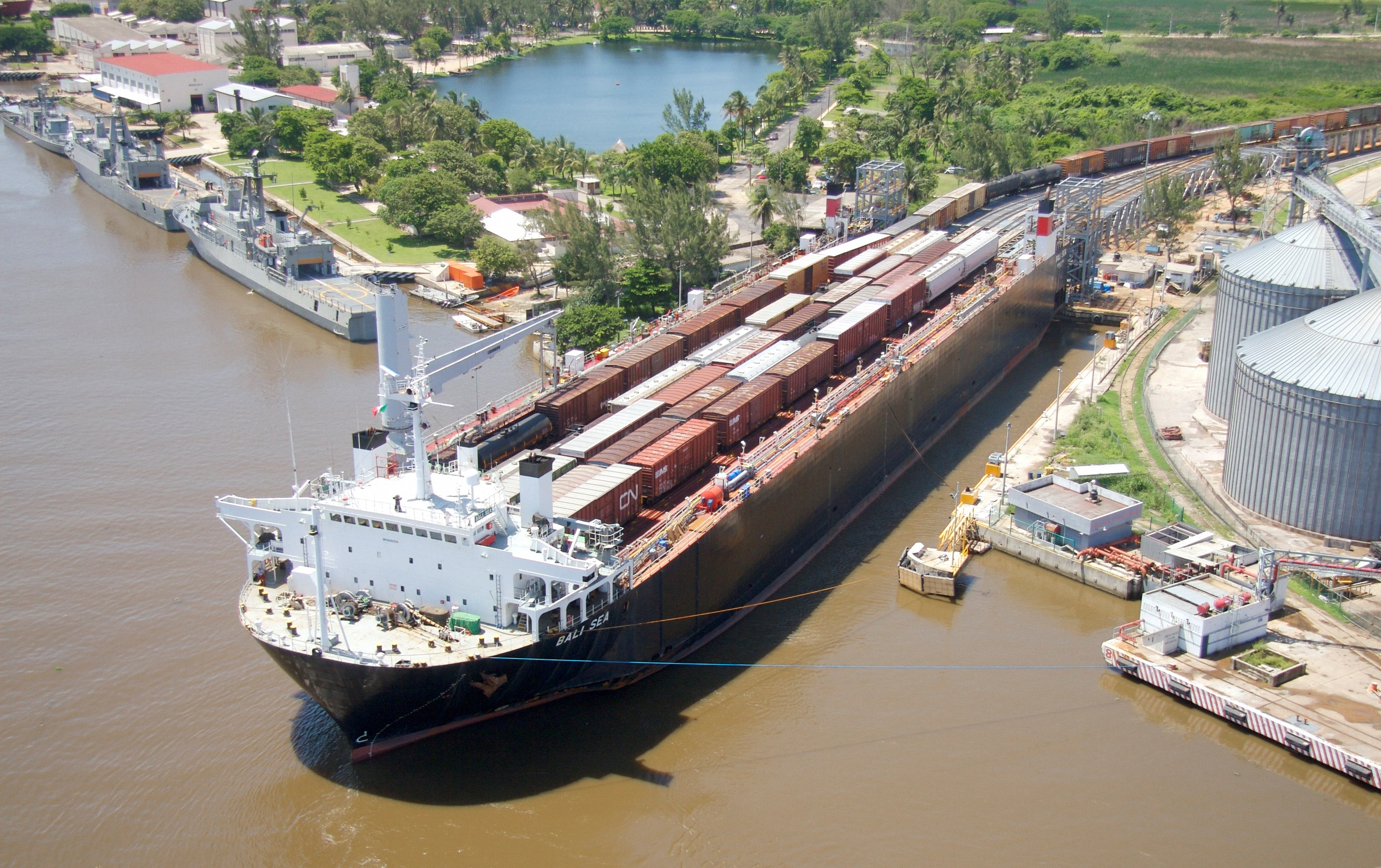
Train ferry MV Bali Sea of CG Railway at Coatzacoalcos port facilities

The city's industry is dominated by the petrochemical sector. Four big industrial petrochemical complexes are located near the city (Pajaritos, Cosoleacaque, Morelos and Cangrejera) making it one of the most important concentrations of its kind in the world. The state-owned Pemex Petroquímica subsidiary is headquartered in Coatzacoalcos and 85% of its production is concentrated there.

== Demographics ==
Historical population
Year	Pop.	±%
1995	259,069	—
2000	267,212	+3.1%
2005	380,363	+42.3%
2010	305,260	−19.7%
2015	319,187	+4.6%
2020	310,698	−2.7%

In 2020, the municipality reported a population of 310,698 inhabitants, 212,540 residing in the municipal seat, which makes it the 3rd largest in the state after Veracruz and Xalapa. Other localities include Ciudad Olmeca (24,085 hab.), Allende (23,351 hab.), Villa San Martín (15,659 hab.) and Puerto Esmeralda (9,585 hab.). Coatzacoalcos is the seat of a Metropolitan Area, which together with the municipalities of Ixhuatlán del Sureste and Nanchital de Lázaro Cárdenas del Río had a population of 354,606 in 2020.

== Education ==
The Universidad Veracruzana maintains a branch campus and library in Coatzacoalcos. Also, TecNM has a campus in the city.

== Sports ==
The Tiburones Rojos de Coatzacoalcos (Red Sharks) played in the Primera División A until December 2008 when they moved to Orizaba to become part of a reformed Albinegros de Orizaba. The Delfines de Coatzacoalcos (Dolphins) play in the Estadio Rafael Hernández Ochoa, which was built in 1980. The Universidad Istmo Americana F.C. plays in the Tercera División de México and is based in Coatzacoalcos.

== Transportation ==
Coatzacoalcos has been a transportation hub for hundreds of years. It is connected via air, water, road, and rail to the surrounding region and the rest of the world.

=== Air ===
The Minatitlán/Coatzacoalcos National Airport is 15 kilometres (9.3 mi) away in Cosoleacaque and has been an international airport since August 2006.

=== Port ===
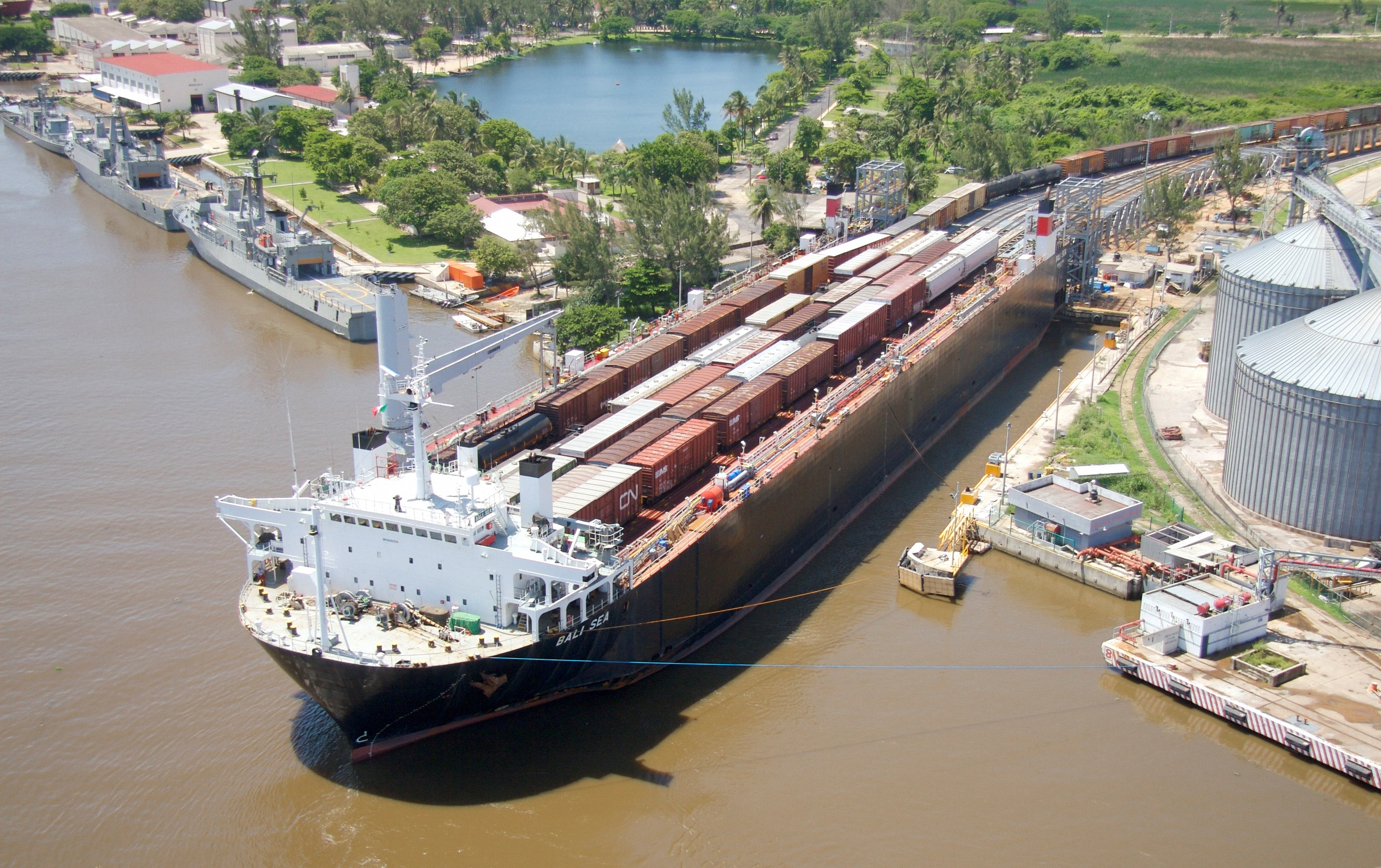
Port of Coatzacoalcos

The Port of Coatzacoalcos (Puerto México) is an international port of entry that provides transhipment of oil and petrochemicals. After an upgrade to the railway along the Tehuantepec Route was opened in 1907 by Porfirio Díaz the port saw an increase of shipping via the Isthmus of Tehuantepec, particularly from the American-Hawaiian Steamship Company. The port saw a decrease in traffic after the opening of the Panama Canal from 1914 on, but traffic has started to build up since the oil boom of the 1970s. The railway is now known as the Ferrocarril Transístmico ("Trans-Isthmic Railroad").

=== Rail ===
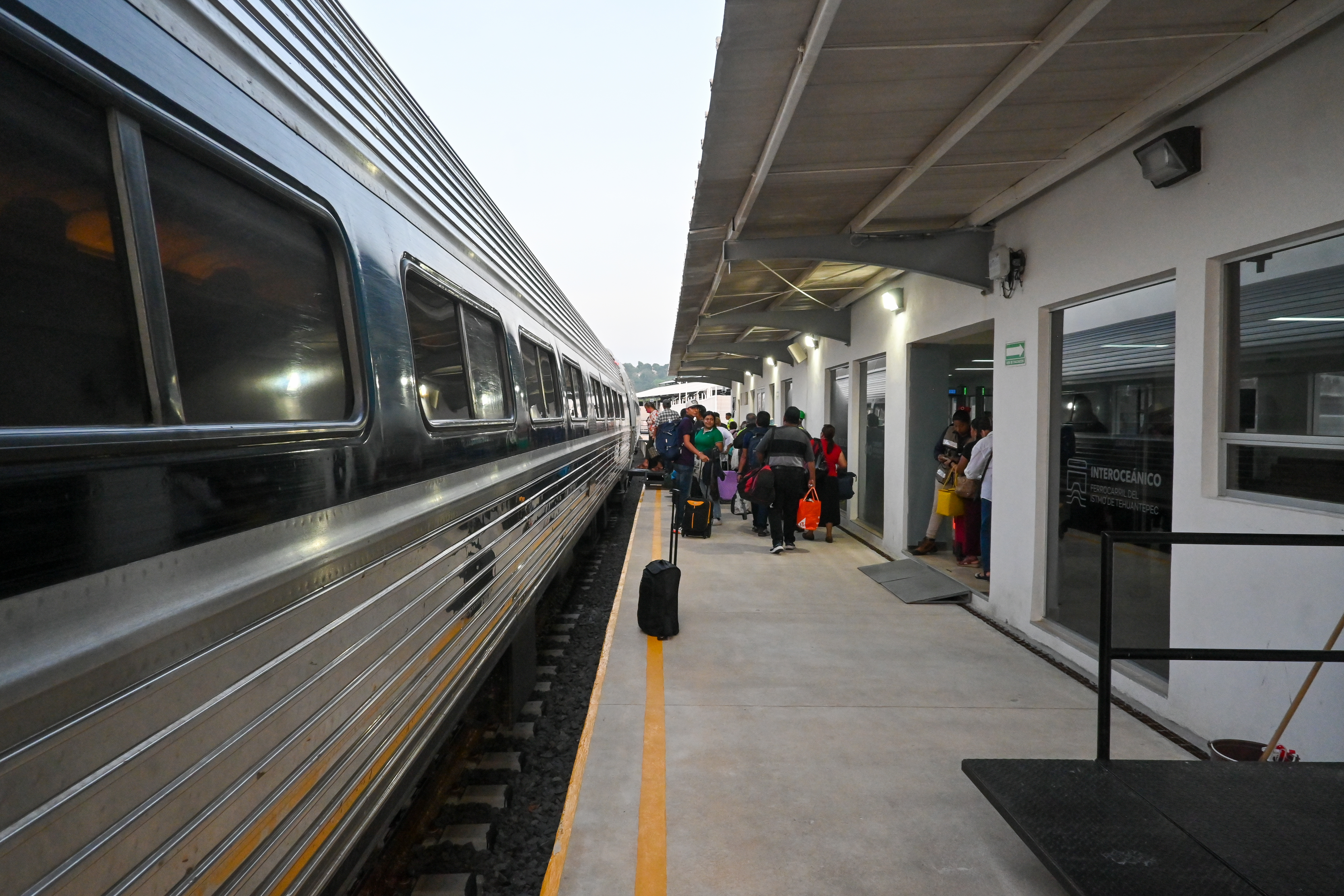
Coatzacoalcos railway station

The Coatzacoalcos railway station serves as the northern terminus of Line Z and the eastern terminus of Line FA of the Tren Interoceánico passenger rail services. Line Z connects the city south to Salina Cruz, Oaxaca while Line FA connects east to Palenque, Chiapas.

Coatzacoalcos serves as the northern end of the Interoceanic Corridor of the Isthmus of Tehuantepec, a major trade corridor that aims to be an alternative to the Panama Canal. Freight rail service is a core component of the corridor.

The CG Railway operates train ferries between the Port of Coatzacoalcos and the United States at the Port of Mobile in Alabama. Ferrosur also provides rail service in and out of Coatzacoalcos as far southeast as Las Choapas, to the north and west to Veracruz and Mexico City, as well as to the south over the Tehuantepec route now owned by Ferrocarril Transístmico from Medias Aguas to Salina Cruz in the state of Oaxaca.

=== Roadways ===
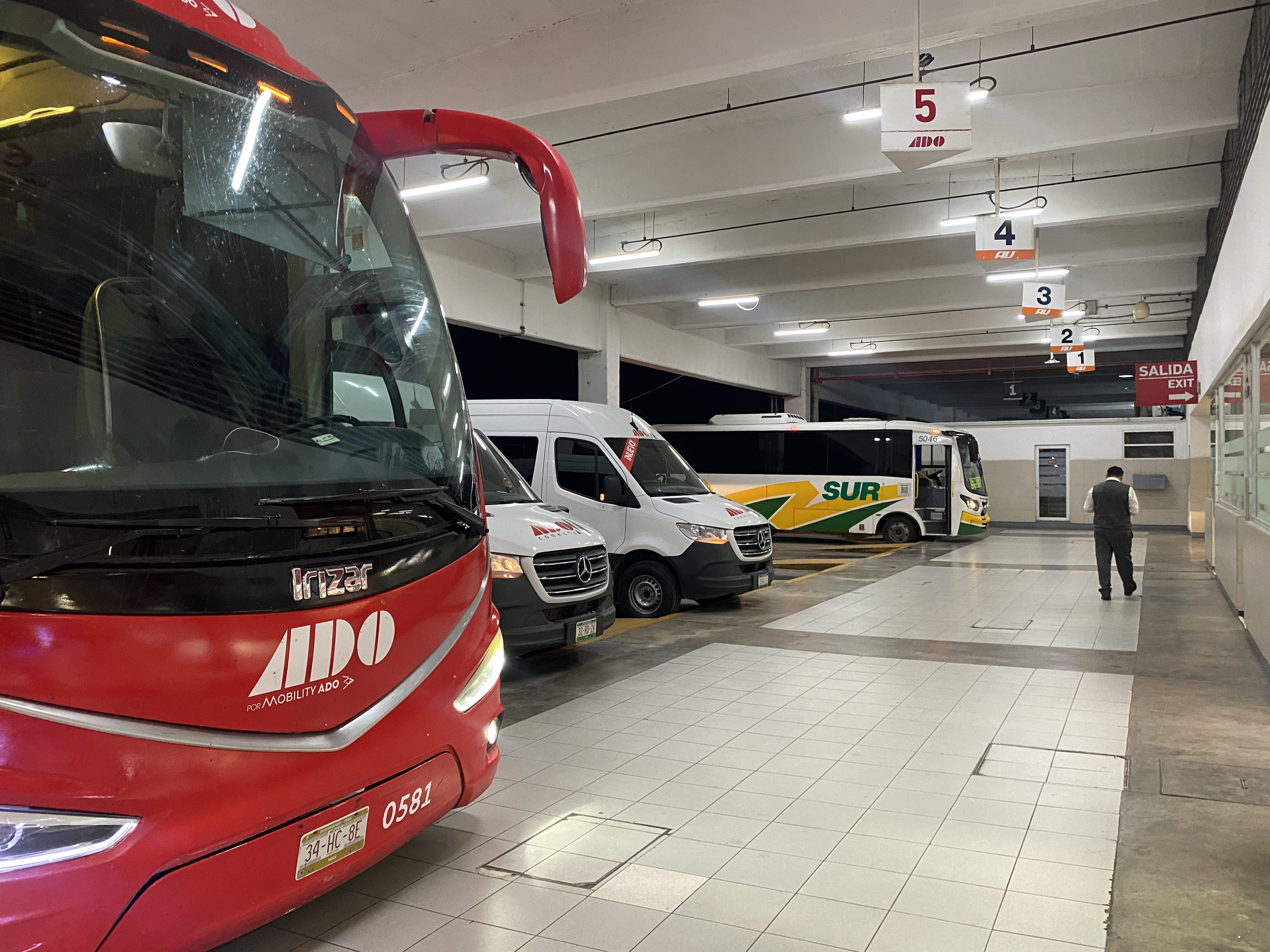
Coatzacoalcos central bus station

Mexican Federal Highway 180 follows the southern shore of the Bay of Campeche through Coatzacoalcos to the Yucatán Peninsula. Highway 180 and a rail line to Allende have been carried over the Coatzacoalcos River via the 1910 built Coatza I bridge for more than a century. A second cable stayed bridge known as Coatza II or Antonio Dovalí Jaime was built to the south to carry more road traffic over the river. It was constructed starting in 1979 and was opened by President Miguel de la Madrid Hurtado on 17 October 1984. Coatza II has a center span of 288 metres (945 ft) and an overall length of 698.25 metres (2,290.8 ft). A ferry operates between the city of Coatzacoalcos and Allende, which in 2017 was supplemented by a 1.1-kilometre (0.68 mi) underwater tunnel that carries four lanes of traffic. Coatzacoalcos is also the northern terminus of Mexican Federal Highway 185, which links it with the Pacific Ocean at Salina Cruz, Oaxaca, on the other side of the Isthmus of Tehuantepec.

== Notable people ==
Coatzacoalcos is the birthplace of actress Salma Hayek; journalist María Antonieta Collins; and footballers Sergio Ramirez, who played for FC Ararat Yerevan, in the Armenian Premier League and José Arturo Rivas, who played for the Tigres de la UANL, in the Primera División de México. Also, Silviano Delgado Valladolid, who was part of Mexico's National Squad during Barcelona 1992 Olympic Games and played for Toluca F.C., Puebla F.C., Morelia F.C.

== Twin towns – sister cities ==
- Rizhao, China
- San Fernando, Philippines

== See also ==
- Coatzacoalcos Municipality
- CG Railway
- German night fighter direction vessel Togo
