= Line FA (Tren Interoceánico) =

Railway line in Mexico

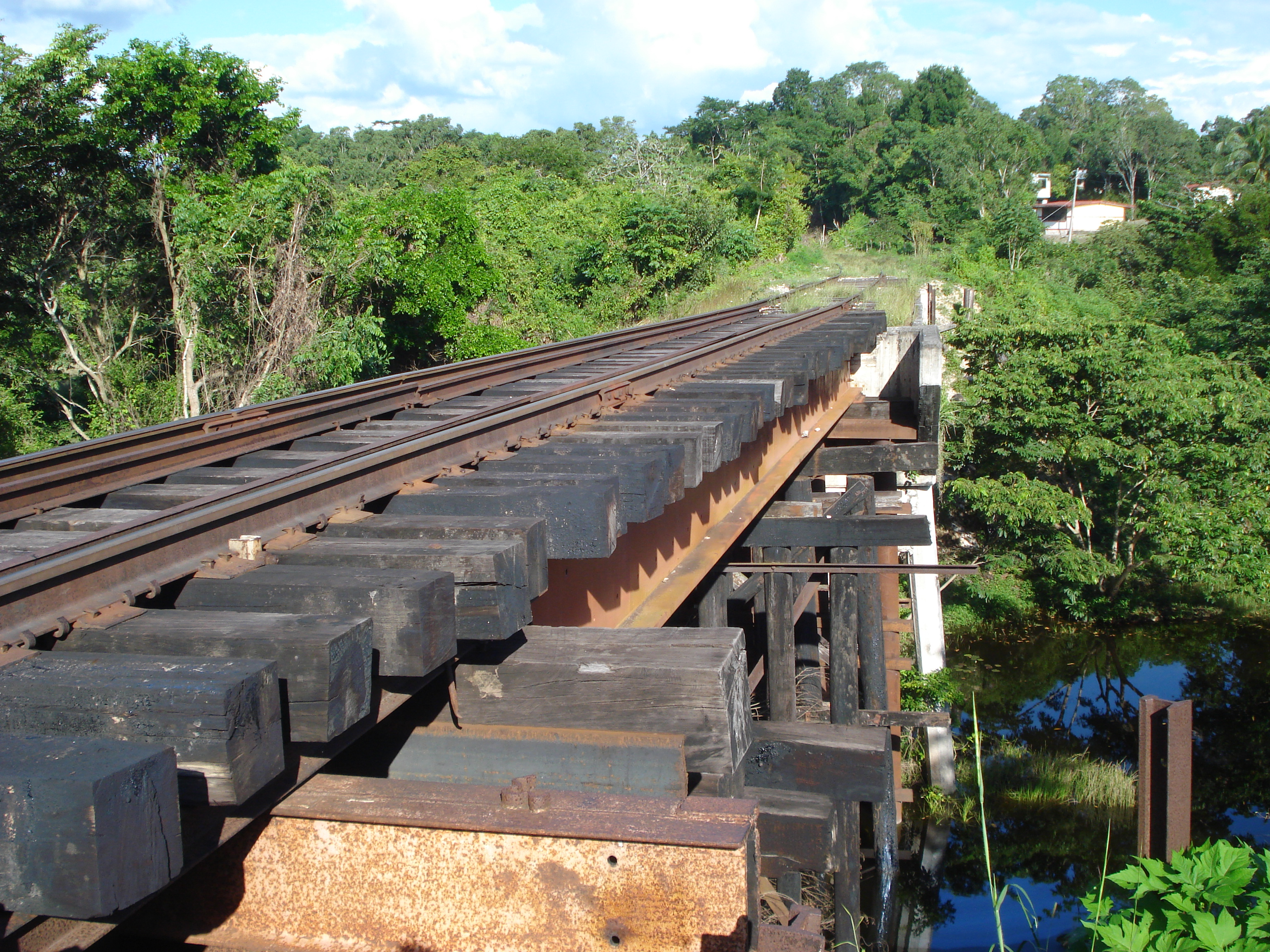
- Railway bridge of Line FA near Candelaria Municipality, Campeche (2010)

Overview
- Other name: Coatzacoalcos–Pakal Ná (Palenque) Line
- Native name: Línea FA
- Owner: Federal government of Mexico
- Locale: Southeastern Mexico
- Termini: Coatzacoalcos; Pakal Ná (Palenque)
- Stations: 31

Service
- Type: Regional rail; Freight rail
- Operator: Ferrocarril del Istmo de Tehuantepec
- Rolling stock: See rolling stock

History
- Opened: 18 September 2023 (freight); 13 September 2024 (passenger)

Technical
- Line length: 894 km (556 mi)
- Track gauge: 1,435 mm (4 ft 8 1/2 in) standard gauge

The Coatzacoalcos–Pakal Ná (Palenque) Line (Spanish: Línea Coatzacoalcos-Pakal Ná (Palenque)), also known as the FA Line (Spanish: Línea FA), is a railway owned by the Mexican government, connecting Coatzacoalcos, Veracruz, and Palenque, Chiapas. It was leased to the Ferrocarriles Chiapas-Mayab company.

== Renovation ==
On 1 May 2022, president Andrés Manuel López Obrador announced an investment of 30 billion pesos for the rehabilitation of the section that goes from the city of Coatzacoalcos, Veracruz, to the city of Palenque, Chiapas, in the southeast of the country. Freight operations on the Coatzacoalcos–Salina Cruz segment had begun by September 2023.

Passenger service was originally planned to return to the FA Line in March 2024, although by 1 March, the federal government of Mexico was planning on beginning passenger service in the middle of 2024.

On September 13, 2024, passenger service was reopened on the FA line from Coatzacoalcos to Pakal Ná (Palenque).

== Proposed branch line ==
In addition to the currently under-construction FA Line, there are plans to build a branch line for freight trains from Roberto Ayala to Dos Bocas, in Tabasco. This branch would begin at the Roberto Ayala station, near the Tabasco–Chiapas border. The branch would travel through the Huimanguillo, Cárdenas, Cunduacán, Comalcalco, and Paraíso municipalities, ending at the port of Dos Bocas, where it would connect with the Olmeca Refinery.

In March 2022, the Secretariat of Finance and Public Credit reported that the new branch would cost 6,054 million pesos.

== Connections ==
The Coatzacoalcos–Palenque Line will join with Line Z of the Isthmus of Tehuantepec Railway at Coatzacoalcos railway station, and with Tren Maya at Palenque railway station.

== See also ==
- Rail transport in Mexico
- Tren Interoceánico
- Tren Maya
