= Coatzacoalcos railway station =

Railway station in Veracruz, Mexico

Coordinates: 18.1265°N 94.4402°W

Coatzacoalcos
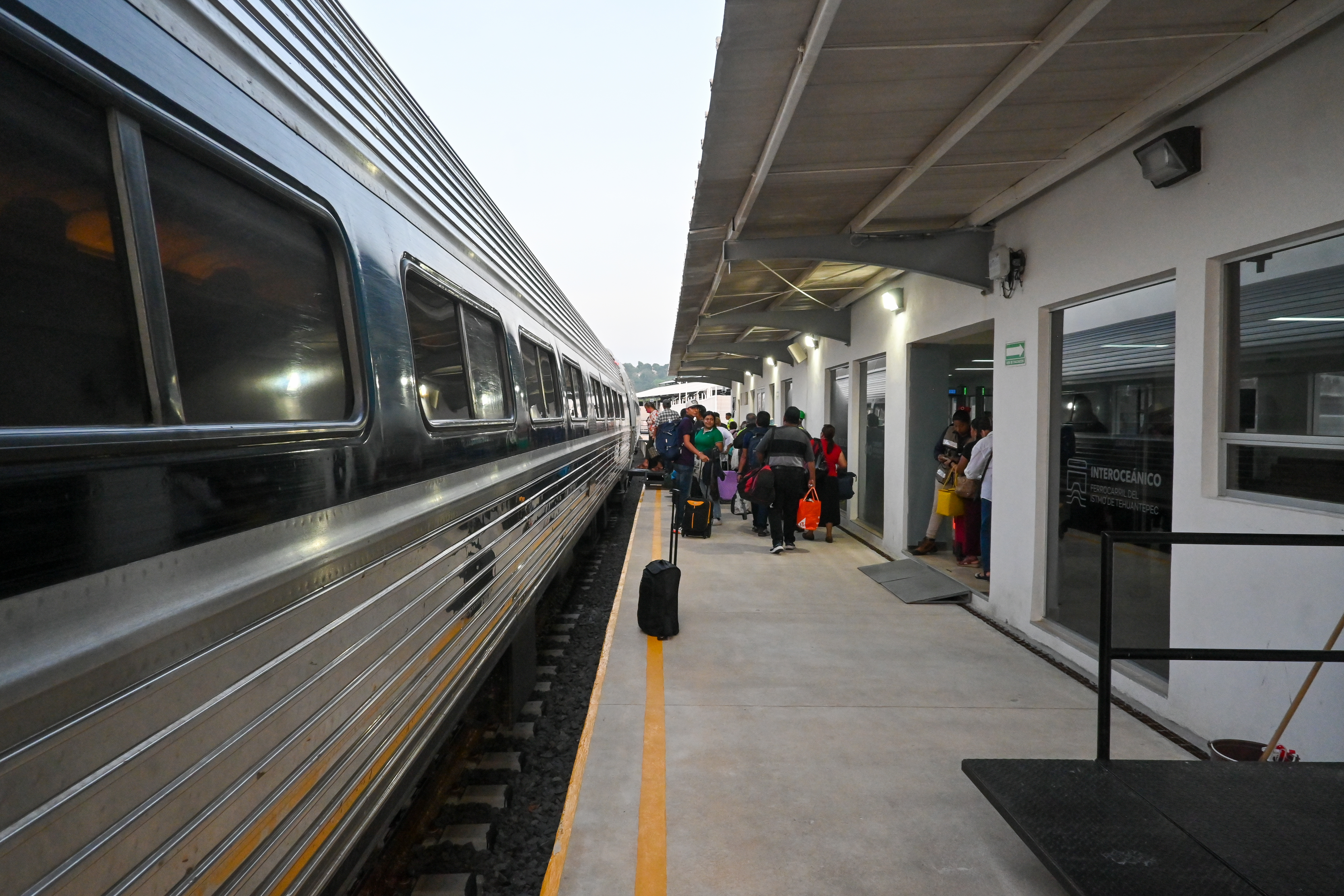
- Passengers boarding a train at the station platform.

General information
- Location: Agustín Lira, Coatzacoalcos; Veracruz; Mexico
- Owner: Federal government of Mexico
- Operator: Secretariat of the Navy
- Lines: Tren Interoceánico Line Z; Ferromex Line G
- Platforms: 1
- Tracks: 14

Construction
- Structure type: At-grade

History
- Opened: 22 December 2023

Services
Preceding station	Tren Interoceánico	Following station
Jáltipan toward Salina Cruz	Line Z	Terminus
Terminus	Line FA	Cuichapa toward Pakal Ná (Palenque)
Location

Coatzacoalcos is a railway station located in Coatzacoalcos, Veracruz.

== Plan ==
In 2023, construction work on the new Coatzacoalcos station of the Ferrocarril Transístmico began. The work was planned to last more than six months and carried out on one hectare of land that was previously concessioned to Ferrosur. The new passenger terminal will be connected through railways with other states with the Tren Maya. The Secretariat of the Navy is in charge of constructing the new station, though it has subcontracted the work to a construction company. As of November 2023, construction works had not started and the site looked abandoned. Nonetheless, on December 22, the line from Salina Cruz to Coatzacoalcos reopened, with the incomplete station.

The delays in the construction of the new station, where caused by changes in the project that failed to account for the marshy soil, led to the decision, just weeks before the project's inauguration, to use the old station building, which had served as Ferrosur's offices for many years, as a temporary station for the new Interoceanic Railway.
