= 7th federal electoral district of Chiapas =

Federal electoral district of Mexico

Chiapas's 7th
- Electoral district of the Chamber of Deputies of Mexico

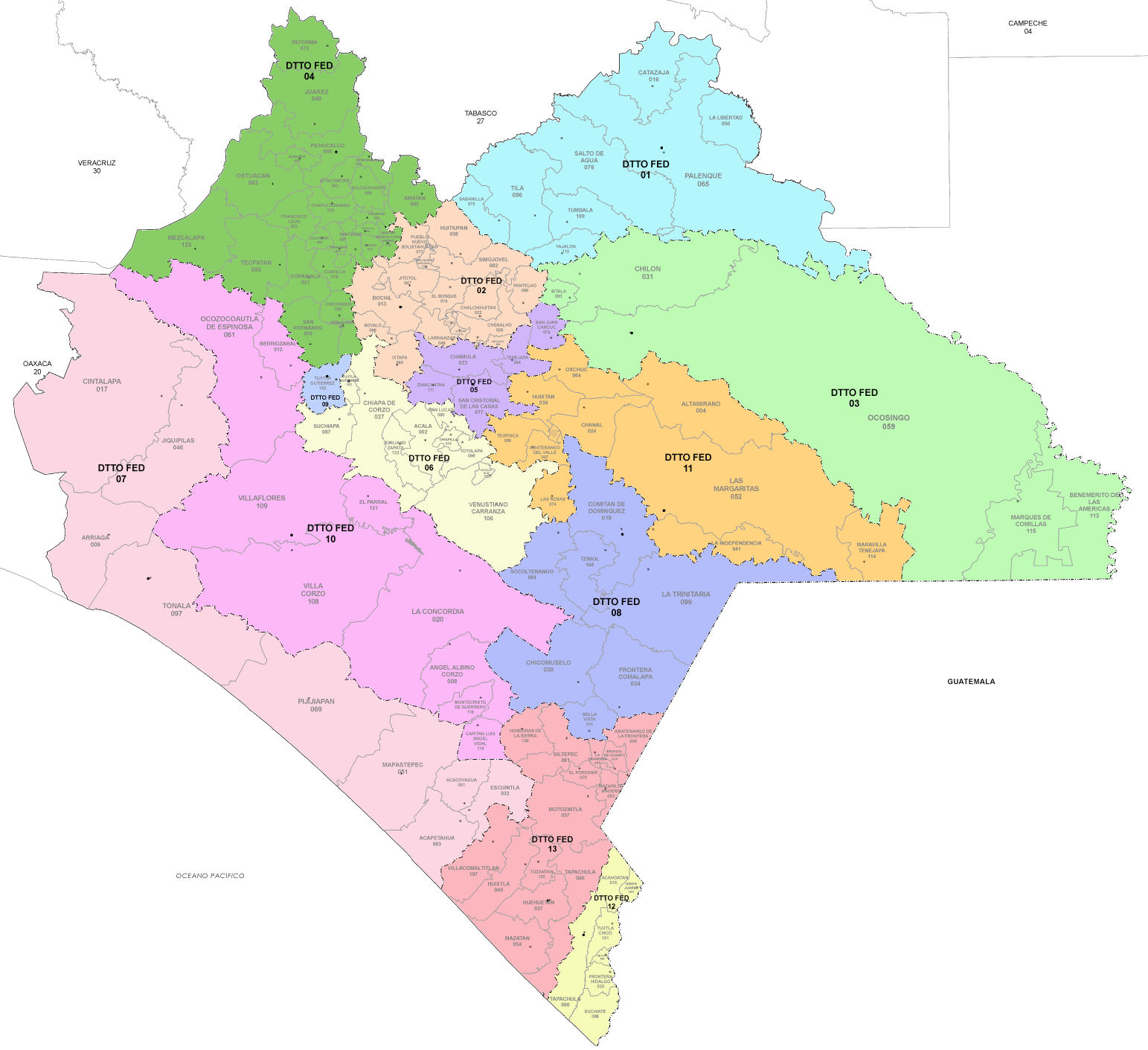
- 7th district

Incumbent
- Member: Azucena Arreola Trinidad
- Party: ▌Morena
- Congress: 66th (2024–2027)

District
- State: Chiapas
- Head town: Tonalá
- Coordinates: 16°6′N 93°45′W
- Covers: Acacoyagua, Acapetahua, Arriaga, Cintalapa, Escuintla, Jiquipilas, Mapastepec, Pijijiapan, Tonalá
- PR region: Third
- Precincts: 214
- Population: 435,249 (2020 census)

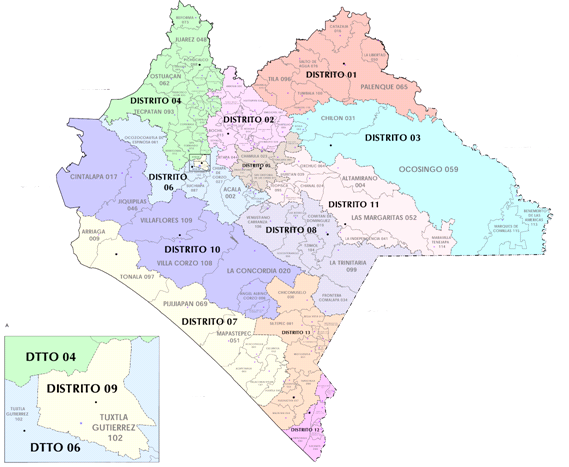
Chiapas under the 2017–2022 districting scheme

7th district in 2005–2017

The 7th federal electoral district of Chiapas (Spanish: Distrito electoral federal 07 de Chiapas) is one of the 300 electoral districts into which Mexico is divided for elections to the federal Chamber of Deputies and one of 13 such districts in the state of Chiapas.

It elects one deputy to the lower house of Congress for each three-year legislative session by means of the first-past-the-post system. Votes cast in the district also count towards the calculation of proportional representation ("plurinominal") deputies elected from the third region.

Suspended in 1930, (Note: An amendment to Article 52 of the Constitution in 1928 changed the original provision of "one deputy per 60,000 inhabitants" to "one deputy per 100,000"; as a result, the size of the Chamber of Deputies fell from 281 in the 1928 election to 171 in 1934.) the 7th district was re-established as part of the 1977 electoral reforms. Under the 1975 districting plan, Chiapas had only six congressional districts; with the 1977 reforms, the number increased to nine. The restored 7th district elected its first deputy in the 1979 mid-term election.

The current member for the district, elected in the 2024 general election, is Azucena Arreola Trinidad of the National Regeneration Movement (Morena).

== District territory ==
Under the 2023 districting plan adopted by the National Electoral Institute (INE), which is to be used for the 2024, 2027 and 2030 federal elections, Chiapas's 7th district covers 214 electoral precincts (secciones electorales) across nine municipalities along the Pacific Ocean coast and the border with the state of Oaxaca:

- Acacoyagua, Acapetahua, Arriaga, Cintalapa, Escuintla, Jiquipilas, Mapastepec, Pijijiapan and Tonalá.

The head town (cabecera distrital), where results from individual polling stations are gathered together and tallied, is the city of Tonalá. The district reported a population of 435,249 in the 2020 census.

== Previous districting schemes ==
Evolution of electoral district numbers
	1974	1978	1996	2005	2017	2023
Chiapas	6	9	12	12	13	13
Chamber of Deputies	196	300				

2005–2017

Between 2017 and 2022, the 7th district comprised nine municipalities in the same region of the state, but with some changes: Acacoyagua, Acapetahua, Arriaga, Escuintla, Huixtla, Mapastepec, Pijijiapan, Tonalá and Villa Comaltitlán.

2005–2017

In 2005–2017, the district was located on the Pacific coast. It comprised the municipalities of Acacoyagua, Acapetahua, Arriaga, Escuintla, Mapastepec, Pijijiapan, Tonalá and Villa Comaltitlán. The head town was the city of Tonalá.

1996–2005

Between 1996 and 2005, the district had a slightly different configuration in the same region. It covered Arriaga, Pijijiapan, Tonalá, Cintalapa and Jiquipilas.

1978–1996

The districting scheme in force from 1978 to 1996 was the result of the 1977 electoral reforms, which increased the number of single-member seats in the Chamber of Deputies from 196 to 300. Under that plan, Chiapas's seat allocation rose from six to nine. The restored 7th district had its head town at Huixtla and it covered 14 municipalities.

== Deputies returned to Congress ==
(Mexico) National parties
- Current
- PAN
- PRI
- PT
- PVEM
- MC
- Morena
- PAZ
- Somos
- Defunct or local only
- PLM
- PNR
- PRM
- PNM
- PP
- PPS
- PARM
- PFCRN
- CON
- PANAL
- PSD
- PES
- PES
- PRD

Chiapas's 7th district
Election	Deputy	Party	Term	Legislature
The seventh district was suspended between 1930 and 1979
1979	Antonio Cueto Citalán	Institutional Revolutionary Party	1979–1982	51st Congress
1982	Sami David David	Institutional Revolutionary Party	1982–1985	52nd Congress
1985	Humberto Andrés Zavala Peña	Institutional Revolutionary Party	1985–1988	53rd Congress
1988	Neftalí Rojas Hidalgo	Institutional Revolutionary Party	1988–1991	54th Congress
1991	Jorge Flammarión Montesinos Melgar	Institutional Revolutionary Party	1991–1994	55th Congress
1994	Gabriel Aguilar Ortega	Institutional Revolutionary Party	1994–1997	56th Congress
1997	Juan Oscar Trinidad Palacios	Institutional Revolutionary Party	1997–2000	57th Congress
2000	Patricia Aguilar García	Institutional Revolutionary Party	2000–2003	58th Congress
2003	Francisco Grajales Palacios	Institutional Revolutionary Party	2003–2006	59th Congress
2006	Fernel Gálvez Rodríguez	Party of the Democratic Revolution	2006–2009	60th Congress
2009	José Manuel Marroquín Toledo	National Action Party (Mexico)	2009–2012	61st Congress
2012	Francisco Grajales Palacios	Institutional Revolutionary Party	2012–2015	62nd Congress
2015	Diego Valera Fuentes	Party of the Democratic Revolution	2015–2018	63rd Congress
2018	Miguel Prado de los Santos	Labour Party (Mexico)	2018–2021	64th Congress
2021	Manuel de Jesús Narcia Coutiño	National Regeneration Movement	2021–2024	65th Congress
2024	Azucena Arreola Trinidad	National Regeneration Movement	2024–2027	66th Congress

== Presidential elections ==
Chiapas's 7th district
Election	District won by	Party or coalition	%
2018	Andrés Manuel López Obrador	Juntos Haremos Historia	68.6628
2024	Claudia Sheinbaum Pardo	Sigamos Haciendo Historia	77.4539
