= Villa Comaltitlán railway station =

Under-construction railway station in Mexico

Villa Comaltitlán

General information
- Location: Villa Comaltitlán, Chiapas, Mexico
- Platforms: 1
- Tracks: 2

History
- Opened: 1908 (originally); Mid-2025 (planned)

Future services
Preceding station	Tren Interoceánico	Following station
Acapetahua toward Salina Cruz	Line K extension	Huixtla toward Ciudad Hidalgo

Villa Comaltitlán is a former and future railway station in Villa Comaltitlán, Chiapas.

== History ==
The station was built on the Ferrocarril Panamericano, a line that, since 1908, connected the towns on the coast of Chiapas and Soconusco. The line also connects the Ferrocarril Transístmico with Guatemala. As a result of the arrival of the railway to Villa Comaltitlán, the old town (Spanish: Pueblo Viejo) was abandoned and a new town, Pueblo Nuevo Comaltitlán (renamed to Villa Comaltitlán in 1960), was founded.

Service on the Ixtepec–Ciudad Hidalgo Line, including Villa Comaltitlán, stopped in 2005, due to Hurricane Stan. However, since 2023, this station is currently being renovated, as part of K Line, a plan to restore passenger rail service from Ixtepec to Ciudad Hidalgo. As a result, as of October 2023, traders that were previously located near the tracks were preparing to relocate away from the line.
