= Huixtla railway station =

Railway station in Chiapas, Mexico

Coordinates: 15.1393°N 92.4652°W

Huixtla

General information
- Location: Huixtla, Chiapas, Mexico
- Platforms: 2
- Tracks: 3

History
- Opened: Early 20th century (originally); Mid-2025 (planned)

Future services
Preceding station	Tren Interoceánico	Following station
Villa Comaltitlán toward Salina Cruz	Line K extension	Tapachula toward Ciudad Hidalgo
Location

Huixtla is a former and future railway station in Huixtla, Chiapas. The building is unique to this region, because it is made from bricks and mud tile roof.

== History ==
The station was established on the Ferrocarril Panamericano, which, since 1908, connected the Ferrocarril Transístmico with towns on the coast of Chiapas (including the region of Soconusco), as well as the Guatemala–Mexico border.

In 2023, work began on cleaning and removing old machinery that was abandoned after Hurricane Stan.
