= Rodolfo Robles =

Guatemalan physician and philanthropist

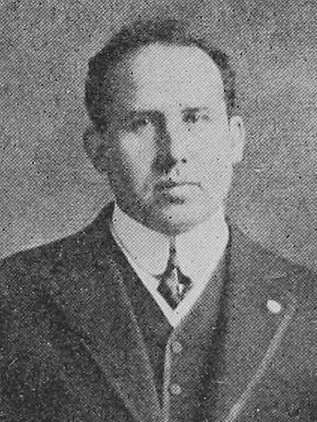
- Robles in 1915
- Born: January 14, 1878; Quetzaltenango, Guatemala
- Died: November 8, 1939 (aged 61); Guatemala City, Guatemala
- Occupation: Physician
- Known for: Describing the relationship between Onchocerca volvulus infection (the causative agent of onchocerciasis, or river blindness) and ocular disease.
- Spouse: Julia Isabel Herrera Dorion de Robles
- Children: Rodolfo Robles Herrera
- Parent(s): Francisco Robles de Leon, Manuela Trinidad Valverde y Alvarez

Rodolfo Robles (January 14, 1878 – November 8, 1939) was a Guatemalan physician and philanthropist. In 1915, he was the first to describe onchocerciasis in Latin America, which was known and widespread on the African continent, with the first description of the adult worms made there in 1890 by Sir Patrick Manson. Robles was the first person to describe the etiology of the disease, correctly attributing it to infection with Onchocerca volvulus parasites. He discerned the etiology from clinical observations among coffee plantation workers in Guatemala, extracting the parasitic worm from a nodule on a child's face. The disease was later referred to as "Roble's disease" in his honor. In the 1930s, Robles also played a role in establishing the first public health campaigns to address onchocerciasis in the Central Endemic Zone of Guatemala, which involved sending teams to endemic areas to provide surgical services and perform nodulectomies.

== Biography ==
Rodolfo Robles was born in Quetzaltenango, Guatemala. As a young man, he was sent to school in the United States, returning to complete high school at the Instituto Nacional para Varones de Occidente (INVO) in 1894. He completed pre-university studies at Rouen, in France, before studying medicine in Paris and earning his degree from the University of Paris in 1904. He performed research at the Pasteur Institute in Paris, where he obtained the Ordre national de la Légion d'honneur (French: "National Order of the Legion of Honour") in the degree of Grand Officier (Grand Officer).

Robles married Julia Isabel Herrera Dorión in 1914, and had one child, Rodolfo Robles Herrera, born in Paris in 1928.

He served as a professor in the Faculty of Medical Sciences for many years.

== Honors and tributes ==
Robles has been honored in Guatemala and Mexico with many schools and hospitals named in his honor, including a hospital in his hometown of Quetzaltenango as well as a hospital focused on eye and ear health in Guatemala City.

In 1955, the Order of Rodolfo Robles was established as award to recognize physicians for outstanding service in the field of public health.

A statue of his likeness can be found outside the old Faculty of Medical Sciences at the Universidad de San Carlos de Guatemala.

A bridge over the Suchiate River, which forms the border between the Mexican state of Chiapas and the Guatemalan department of San Marcos, has been named Puente Rodolfo Robles in his honor.
