= Museo del Ferrocarril =

Museo del Ferrocarril meaning Railway Museum may refer to:

- Railway Museum (Madrid), Spain (Museo del Ferrocarril)
- Catalonia Railway Museum, Spain (Museu del Ferrocarril de Catalunya)
- Gijón Railway Museum, Spain (Museo del Ferrocarril de Asturias)
- Guatemala City Railway Museum, Guatemala (Museo del Ferrocarril FEGUA)

== See also ==
- List of railway museums
