= Puente Rodolfo Robles =

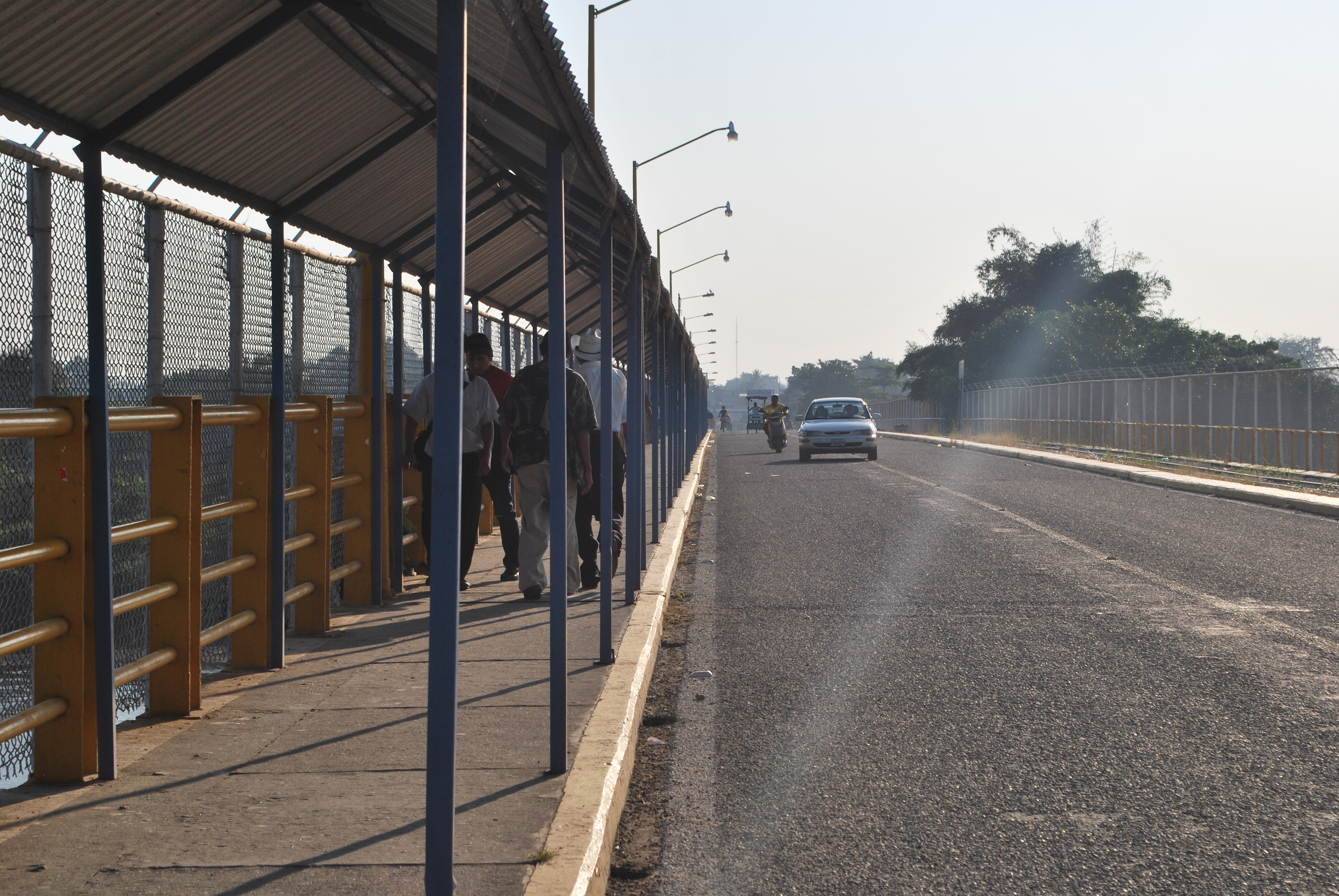
- Traffic on the bridge in 2011
- Coordinates: 14.6765°N 92.1473°W
- Carries: road traffic (restored rail traffic also)
- Crosses: Suchiate River
- Locale: Ayutla Guatemala – Ciudad Hidalgo, Chiapas, Mexico

Location
- Interactive map of Puente Rodolfo Robles

Puente Rodolfo Robles is a bridge across the Suchiate River between Ciudad Hidalgo in the Mexican state of Chiapas and Ciudad Tecún Umán in Guatemala. The bridge is named after Rodolfo Robles, the Guatemalan physician who first described "Robles disease" (Onchocerciasis). The bridge that is used for road traffic as well as restored rail traffic.

== See also ==
- Guatemalan rail link with Mexico
- Line K (Tren Interoceánico)
- Mexican rail link with Guatemala
- Port Chiapas
- List of international bridges in North America
