= Guatemala–Mexico border =

International border

Coordinates: 17°49′0″N 89°9′0″W

Border between Mexico and Guatemala.

A typical sign constructed by the International Boundary and Water Commission and mounted at the exact location of the border.

The international border between Guatemala and Mexico measures 871 km (541 mi). It runs between north and west Guatemala (the Guatemalan departments of San Marcos, Huehuetenango, El Quiché and El Petén) and the Mexican states of Campeche, Tabasco and Chiapas. The border includes stretches of the Usumacinta River, the Salinas River, and the Suchiate River.

Geopolitically, this border represents much of the western and northern boundary of the region of Central America within North America. It is across this border that most of the commerce between Mexico and Guatemala and the rest of Central America takes place.

== History ==
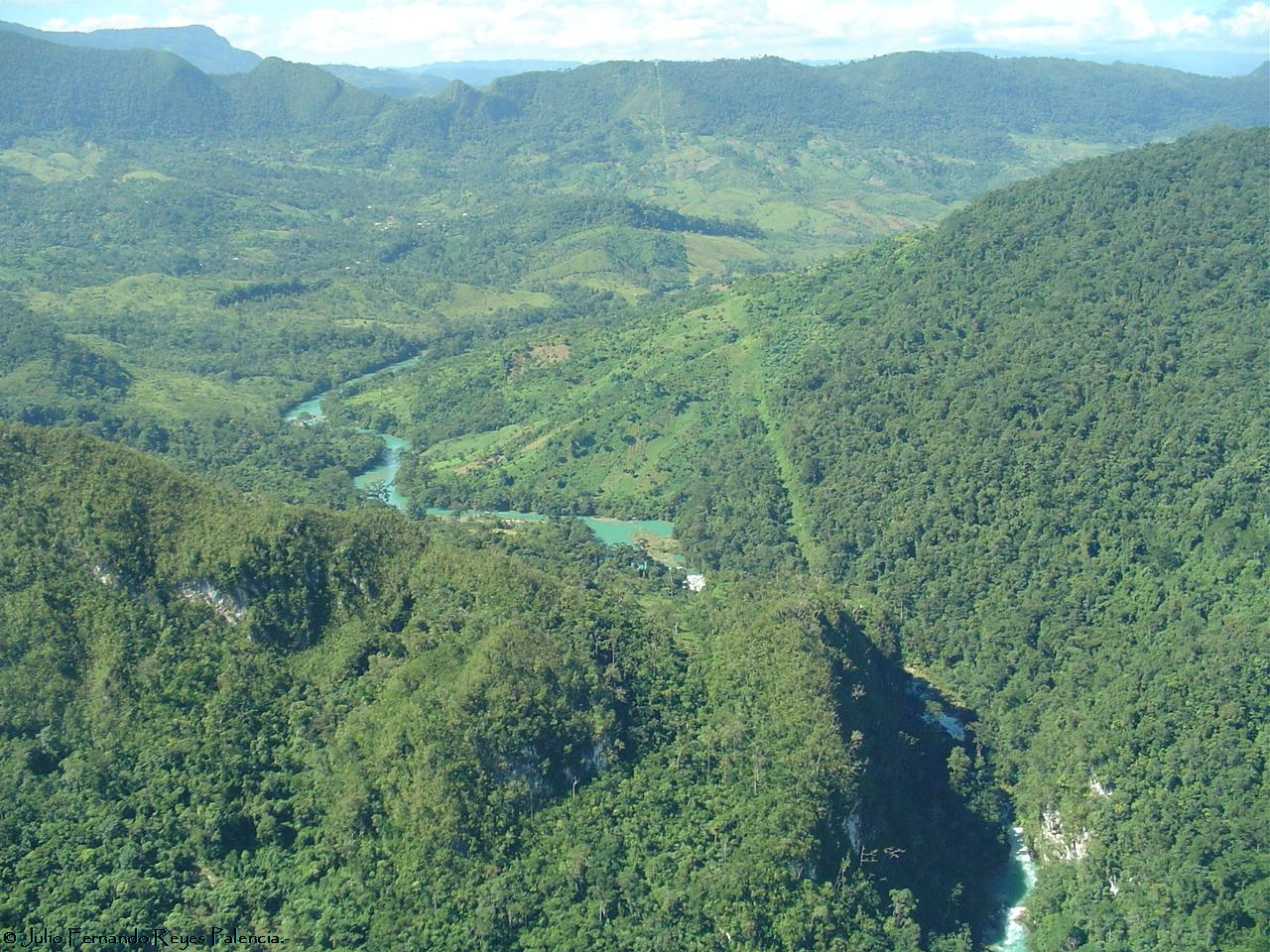
Photo of a landscape of the Mexico-Guatemala border, with Mexico on the right

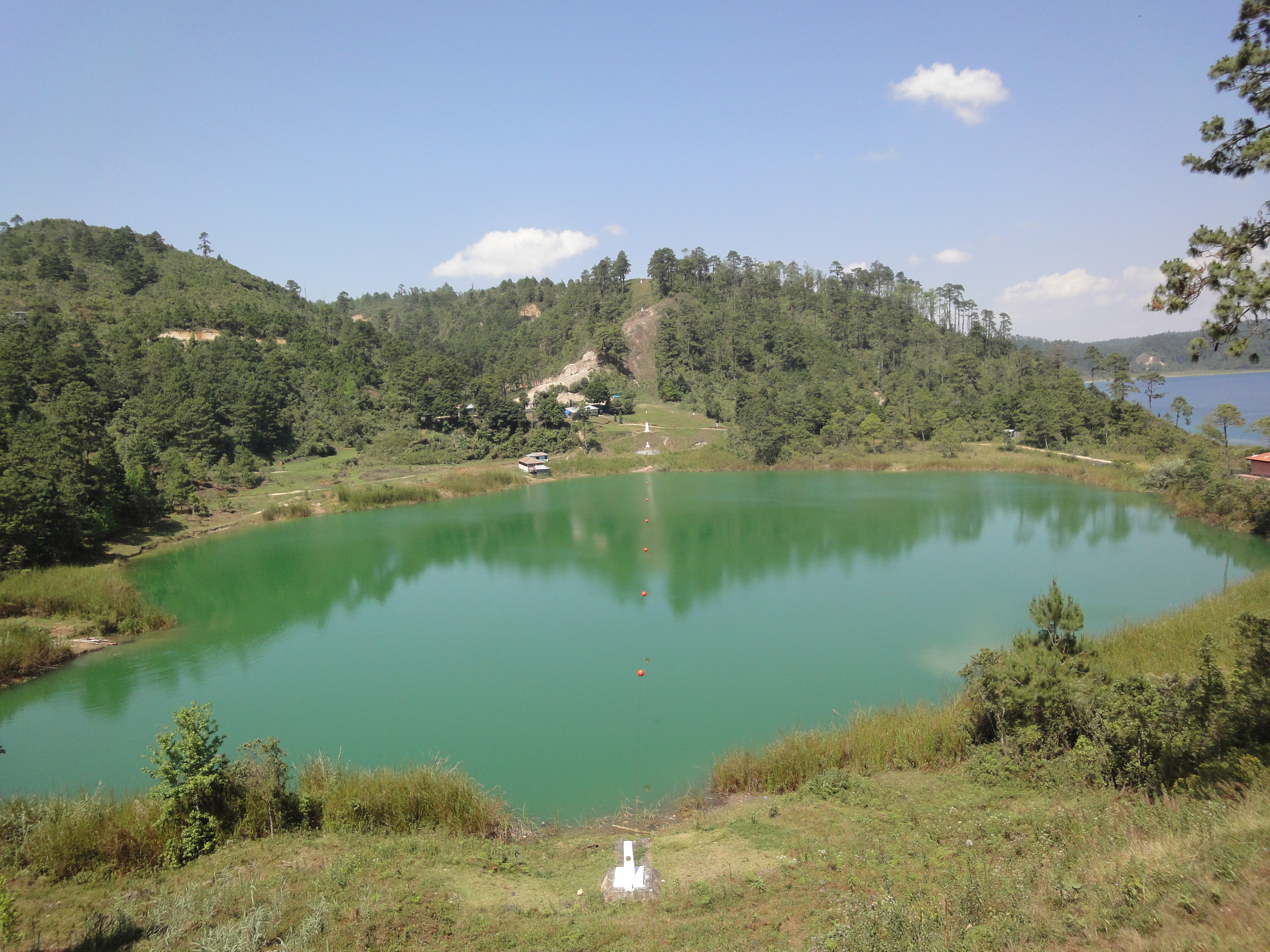
Border between Guatemala (left) and Mexico (right), in Lagunas de Montebello National Park, delineated by cleared trees and a white border marker.

In 1881, problems arose for Guatemala when President Justo Rufino Barrios claimed lands in Soconusco and Chiapas. The initial position of the Government of Mexico was not to accept discussion about their rights in that region. However, from 1882 began talks to resolve the problem between Matías Romero and Justo Rufino at The Winch at Hacienda de Barrios (Soconusco), where both had possessions. They decided to go to arbitration in the United States.

The preliminary agreement was signed in New York City on 12 August 1882, and it stated that: "The Republic of Guatemala dispenses with the argument that has held about his rights to the territory of Chiapas and Soconusco department." The position of Mexico is well seated in their rights of those territories. The final boundary treaty was signed in Mexico City on September 27 of 1882. The first article provides that: "The Republic of Guatemala forever renounce rights that judges have on the territory of the State of Chiapas and Soconusco your district, and therefore considers the territory as part of the United Mexican States." As for the delineation of the border itself, Mexico and Guatemala agreed to use straight lines between key points known and accepted by both countries. The measurement and demarcation work was completed in 1899. Soconusco in Guatemala advanced to the Suchiate river and Mexico received the county of Motozintla.

== Definition ==
Article 3 of the treaty of September 27, 1882, defines the Guatemala-Mexico border as follows:

1. The line along the middle of the Suchiate River, from a point situated in the sea three leagues from its mouth, up river, along its deepest channel, as far as the point [Vertice de Muxbal] where the same river intersects the vertical plane that passes the highest part of the volcano of Tacana, and about 25 meters distant from the most southern pillar of the Custom-house Station of Talquian, in such manner that this Custom-house Station shall be within the territory of Guatemala.
2. The line determined by the vertical plane previously defined, from its meeting with the Suchiate River until it intersects the vertical plane which passes over the summits of Buenavista and Ixbul [Vertice de Niquihuil].
3. The line determined by the vertical plane that passes by the summit of Buenavista, and which has already been astronomically fixed by the Mexican Scientific Commission, and the summit of the Ixbul Hill, from its intersection with the former one up to a point 4 kilometers beyond the same hill [Vertice de Santiago].
4. The parallel of latitude, which passes through this last point, and from thence in an easterly direction until meeting with the deepest channel of the Usumacinta River or the Chixoy River, in case the aforesaid parallel should not meet the first-named of these rivers.
5. The line along middle of the deepest channel of the Usamacinta, continuing along this latter, in the other case, from the meeting of the one or the other river with the aforesaid parallel, until the deepest channel of the Usamacinta meets the parallel situated 25 kilometers to the south of Tenosique, in Tabasco, measured from the center of the square of the said town.
6. The parallel of latitude just referred to, from where it intersects the deepest channel of the Usamacinta, until the meeting with the meridian [Vertice del Ceibo], which passes at a third part of the distance between the centers of the squares of Tenosique and Sacluc, the said third part being reckoned from Tenosique.
7. This meridian from its intersection with the aforesaid parallel to latitude 17°49' [Vertice de Campeche].
8. The parallel of 17°49' from its intersection with the aforesaid meridian indefinitely towards the east [Vertice de Aguas Turbias].

== Immigration issues ==
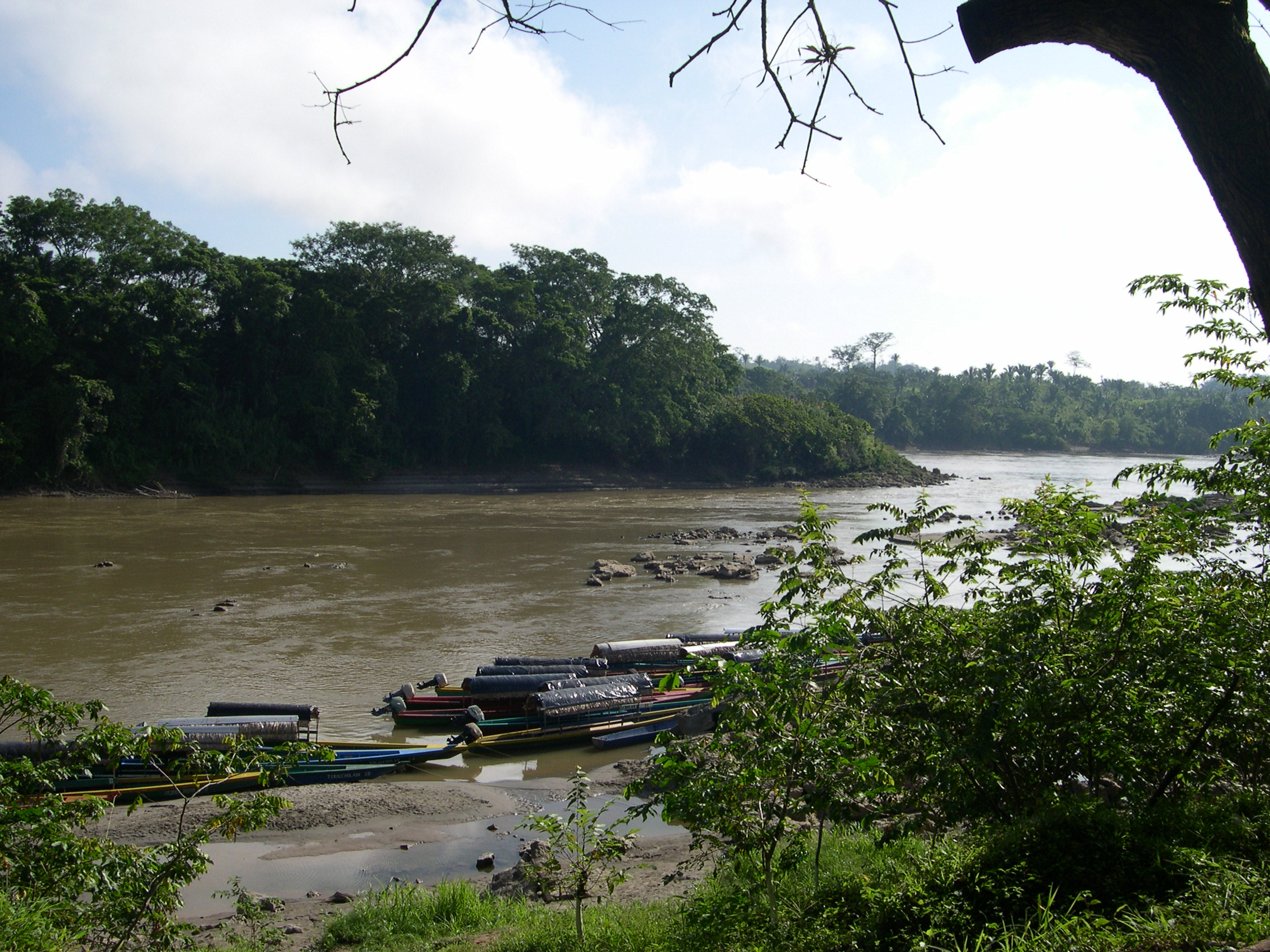
The Usumacinta River as viewed from Chiapas. The far bank is Guatemala.

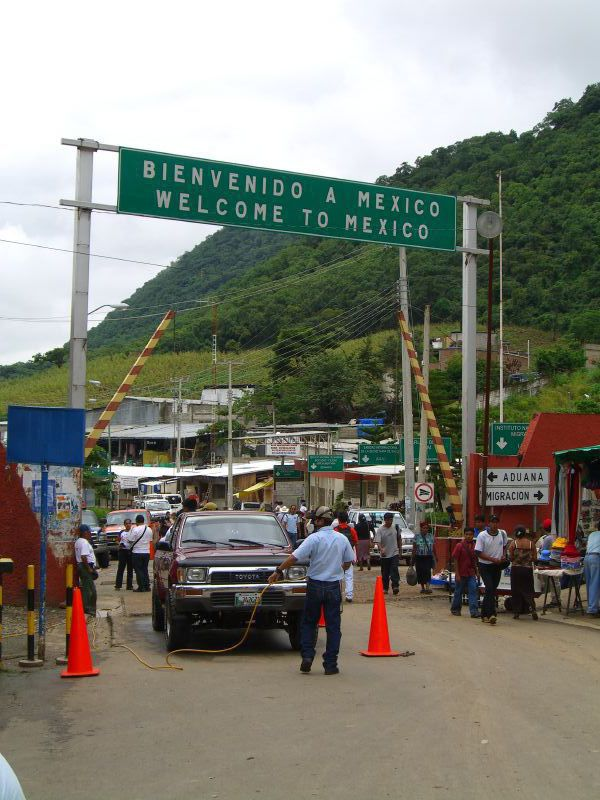
Entrance to Mexico in the Ciudad Hidalgo border crossing

In 2006, Joseph Contreras profiled the entry of Guatemalan immigrants Mexico for Newsweek magazine and pointed out that while Mexican president Vicente Fox demanded that the United States grant legal residency to millions of Mexican immigrants, in Mexico 15,000 immigrants had been regularly registered. Additionally, Contreras found that at coffee farms in the state of Chiapas, "40,000 Guatemalan field hands endure backbreaking jobs and squalid living conditions to earn roughly [US]$3.50 a day" and that some farmers "even deduct the cost of room and board from that amount."

=== Programa Frontera Sur ===
Like the Mexico–United States border, Mexico has some fencing along its southern border with Guatemala. In July 2014, Mexico adopted the Programa Frontera Sur at the urging of the United States. The plan proposes "to overcome common challenges related to migration and respect for human rights" and to establish "a more modern, efficient, prosperous and secure border." Instead of building a wall and preventing people from crossing the border, Mexico relies on interior enforcement via layers of checkpoints staffed by the National Institute of Migration, the military police, the Mexican Army, and the Mexican Navy. The results of the enforcement program has been mixed with increased detentions and removals but also increased victimization of migrants by criminal gangs and corrupt government officials due to more dispersed flows as migrants use less travelled routes. In 2015, Mexican authorities arrested more than 170,000 Central Americans up from 120,000 in 2014. In 2016, according to the Mexican civil rights organization Meso-American Migration Movement (Movimiento Migrante Mesoamericano), over 400,000 migrants crossed Mexico's southern border with 20,000 of them dying or disappearing in Mexico due to criminal gangs, trafficking, or exposure to the elements.

== Gun and drug running ==
The border with Guatemala is the primary source of military grade weaponry – including rocket-propelled grenades, hand grenades, plastic explosives, and grenade launchers – used by the Mexican drug cartels. The weapons are typically stolen from Central American government munitions stockpiles. A 2010 leaked U.S. diplomatic cable states that Mexico does not have sufficient resources to patrol the border with only 125 officers to monitor the entire 929-kilometre (577 mi) border. Mexican officials confirm that they do not have sufficient resources as they have been concentrating their efforts on fighting the cartels in the North.

== Cities and border crossings ==
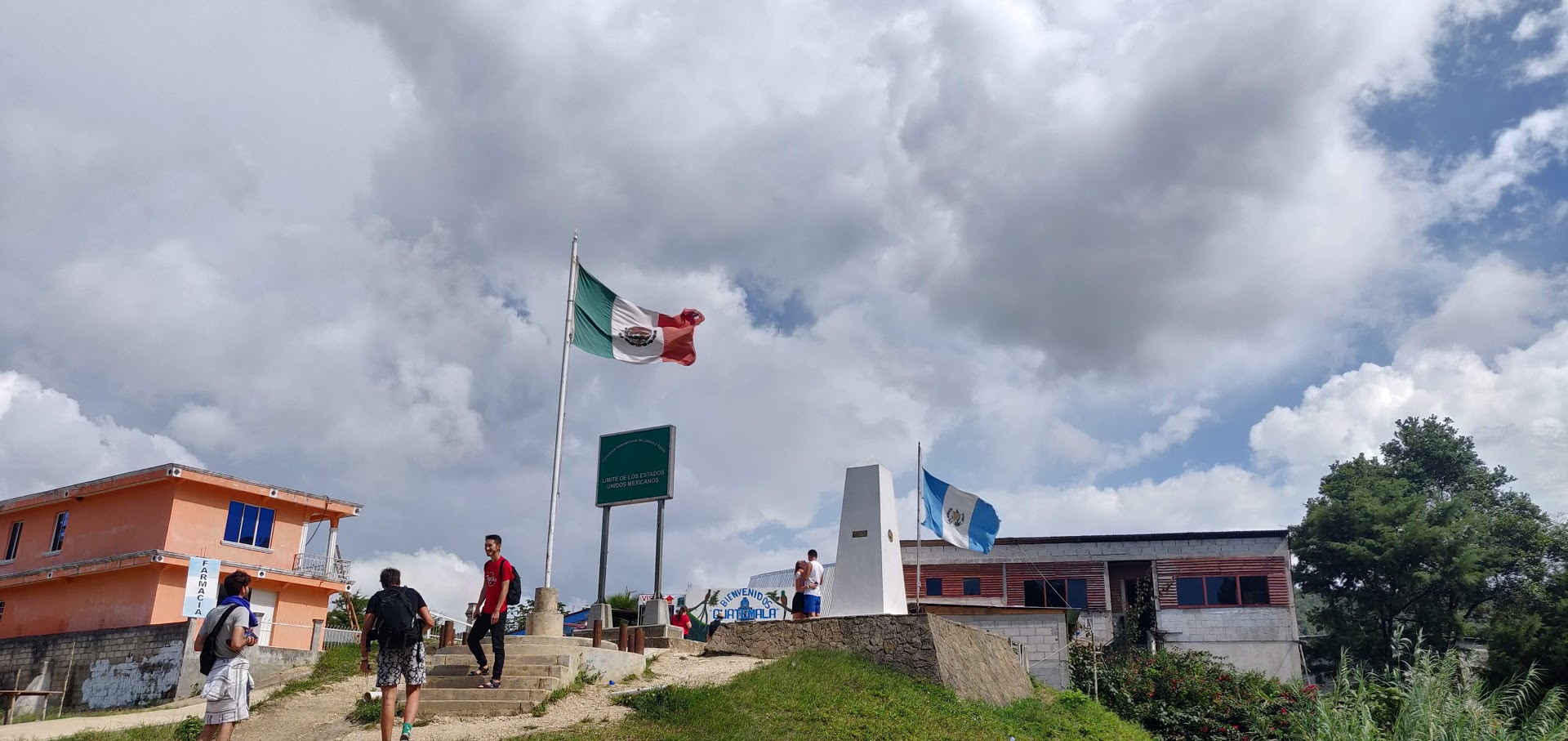
Mexico-Guatemala border from the Mexican side. The pharmacy that can be seen in the background is part of Guatemala.

In 2014, Mexico's border with Guatemala and Belize had 11 formal crossings (10 with Guatemala and 1 with Belize) and more than 370 informal crossings. As part of an effort known as Plan Frontera Sur (Southern Border Plan), which is intended to limit illegal Central American entry into the country, Mexico will increase the number of formal crossings.

Guatemala and Mexico had 10 formal border crossings in 2004:

- Ciudad Hidalgo, Chiapas – Ciudad Tecún Umán, San Marcos
- Talismán, Chiapas – El Carmen, San Marcos
- Union Juárez, Chiapas – Toquían Grande, San Marcos
- Mazapa de Madero, Chiapas – Sibinal, San Marcos
- Ciudad Cuahtemoc, Chiapas – La Mesilla, Huehuetenango
- Carmen Xhán, Chiapas – Gracias a Dios, Huehuetenango
- Nuevo Orizaba, Chiapas – Ingenieros, El Quiché
- Frontera Corozal, Chiapas - Bethel, El Petén
- El Ceibo, Tabasco – El Ceibo, El Petén
- El Martillo, Tabasco – El Naranjo, El Petén

== See also ==
- Belize–Mexico border
- Volcán Tacaná
