= Acapetahua =

- Municipality
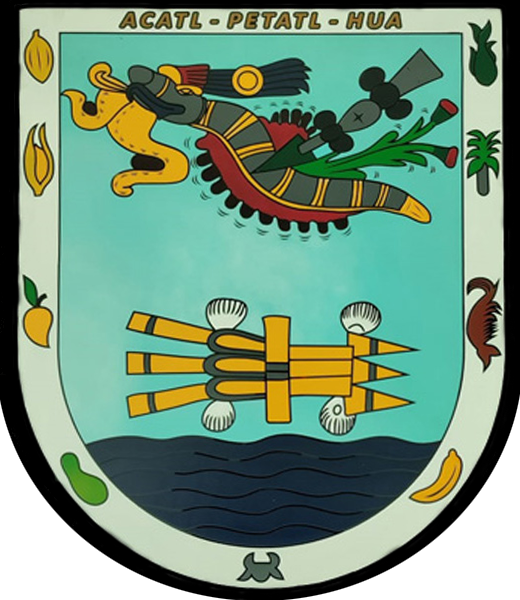
- Coat of arms

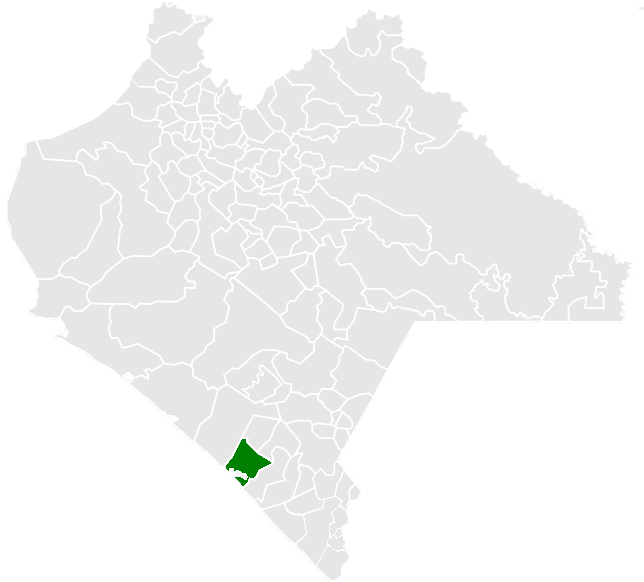
- Municipality of Acapetahua in Chiapas

- Location in Mexico
- Coordinates: 15°17′N 92°41′W
- Country: Mexico
- State: Chiapas

Area
  - Total: 73.9 sq mi (191.3 km^{2})

Population (2010)
  - Total: 27,580

Acapetahua is a town and municipality in the Mexican state of Chiapas, in southeastern Mexico. As of 2010, the municipality had a total population of 27,580, up from 14,189 in 2005.

As of 2010, the town of Acapetahua had a population of 6,194. Other than the town of Acapetahua, the municipality had 272 localities, the largest of which (with 2010 populations in parentheses) were: Soconusco (2,502), classified as urban, and Consuelo Ulapa (1,937), El Arenal (1,157), and Jiquilpan (Estación Bonanza) (1,119), classified as rural.

== History ==
The precise date that the town was founded is unknown. However, it existed well before the Spanish conquered the continent. In 1524, Pedro de Alvarado conquered the region known as Soconusco, In 1526 the region formed part of the Spanish colonization and in 1529 was annexed to México. In 1774 it was formed as part of the town of Escuintla. In 1861, it had more than 100 inhabitants. On November 10, 1947, César A. Lara, governor of the state, declared it an official municipality.

== Economy ==
The municipality is known for its avocado production.

== Transportation ==
Tren Interoceánico plans to build a station for its Line K in Acapetahua. The second phase of this line, which includes this station, is scheduled to open in mid-2025.

Future services
Preceding station	Tren Interoceánico	Following station
Pijijiapan toward Salina Cruz	Line K extension	Villa Comaltitlán toward Ciudad Hidalgo
