= Tapachula railway station =

Railway station in Chiapas, Mexico

Coordinates: 14.8986°N 92.2683°W

Tapachula

General information
- Location: Tapachula, Chiapas, Mexico
- Platforms: 1
- Tracks: 2

History
- Opened: Early 20th century (originally); Mid-2025 (planned)

Future services
Preceding station	Tren Interoceánico	Following station
Huixtla toward Salina Cruz	Line K	Ciudad Hidalgo Terminus
Location

Tapachula is a former and future railway station in Tapachula, Chiapas, Mexico.

== History ==
The station was inaugurated at the beginning of the 20th century. In October 2005, Hurricane Stan collapsed several sections of the railway system, making it impossible for trains to pass. Originally, because of the magnitude of the disaster, it was not feasible to reconstruct these sections, so the former Tapachula station became a garbage dump and a dormitory for homeless people.

== Rehabilitation ==
In 2021, thanks to the management of the Secretariat of Agrarian, Land, and Urban Development (SEDATU), the station was rescued for cultural activities, sports, and local memories. This was part of the Urban Improvement Program, implemented through the municipal government.
