= Port Chiapas =

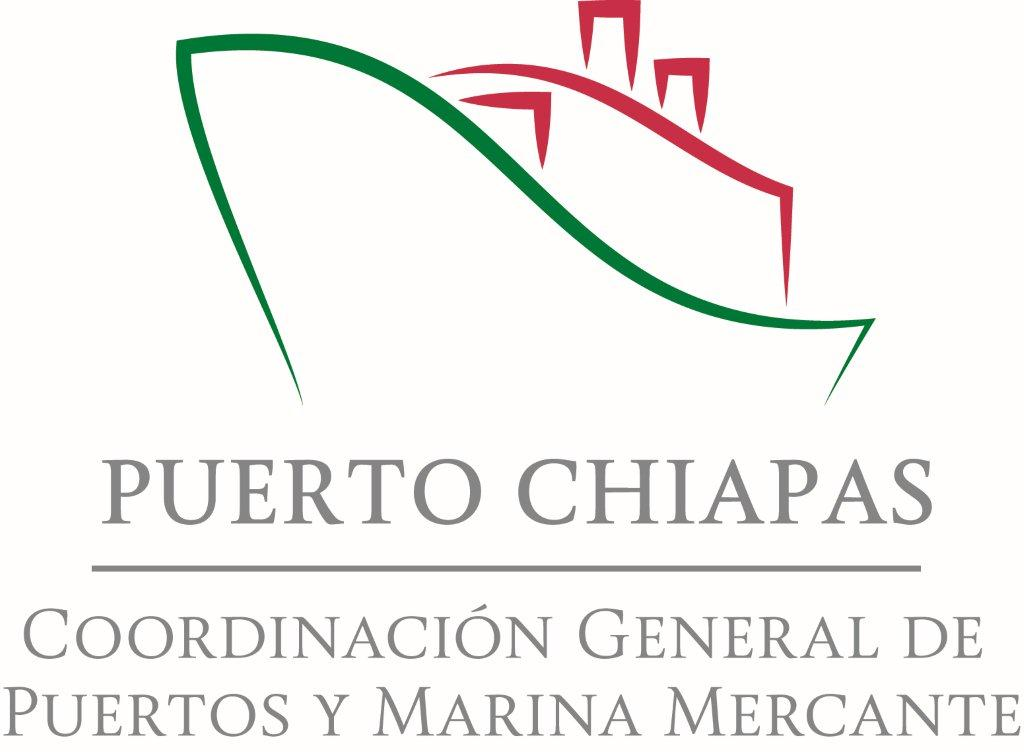
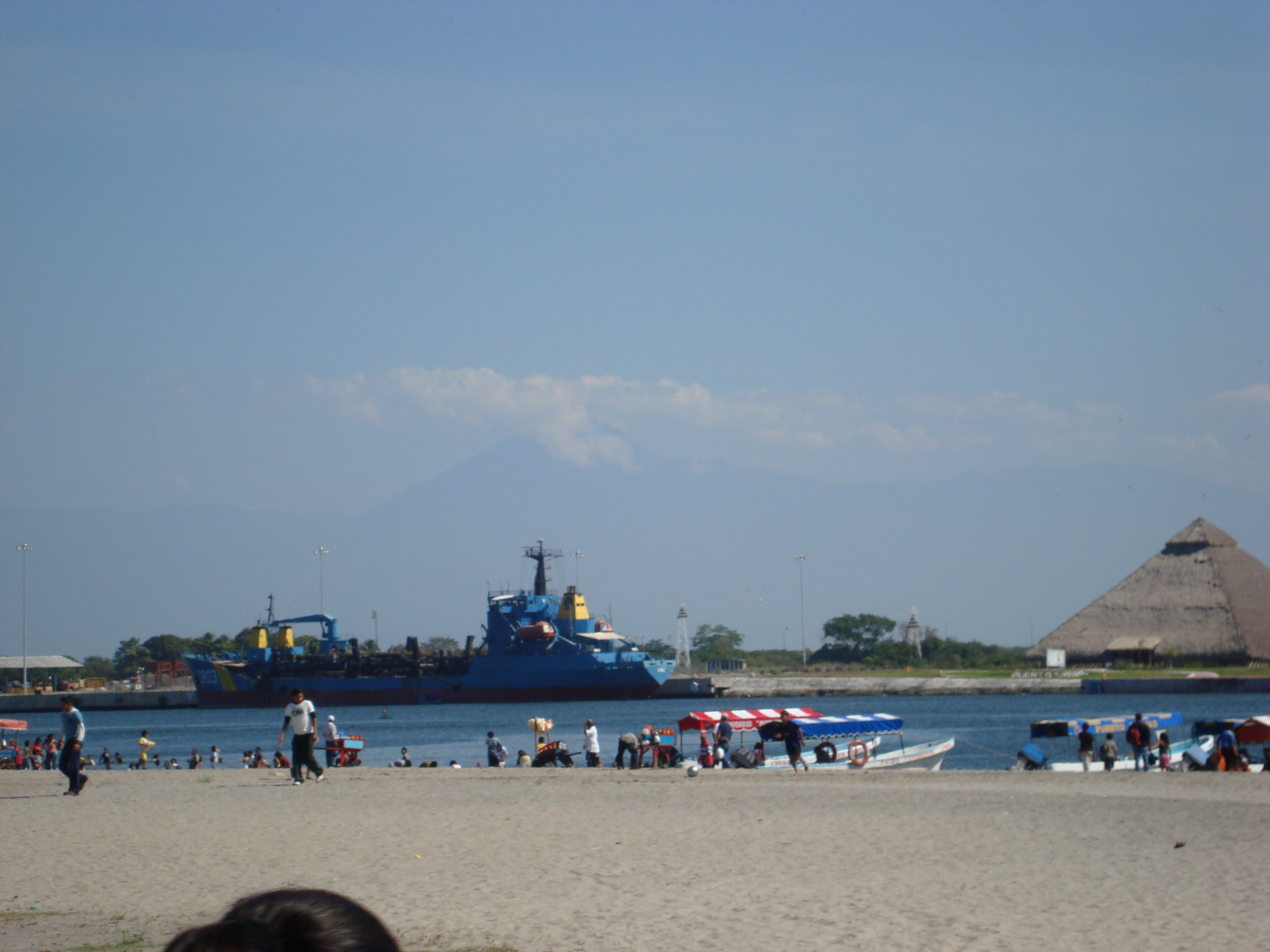
- Puerto Chiapas with mountains in the distance, 25 December 2008
- Interactive map of Port Chiapas
- Location in Mexico
- Native name: Puerto Chiapas

Location
- Country: Mexico
- Location: Tapachula, Chiapas
- Coordinates: 14°41′49″N 92°24′40″W
- UN/LOCODE: MXZLO

Details
- Opened: 1975
- Operated by: Port Chiapas Port Authority
- Type of harbour: bulk (coffee, minerals, gas), container, cruise
- Size of harbour: 950 m × 350 m (3,120 ft × 1,150 ft)
- Land area: 60,000 square metres (6.0 ha; 15 acres) container storage
- No. of berths: 7
- Draft depth: 9.75 metres (32.0 ft)
- Director General: Alfonso Perez

Statistics
- Annual revenue: $1.5 million (2009)
- Website www.puertochiapas.com.mx

The Port Chiapas (Spanish: Puerto Chiapas) or Puerto Madero is a port in Puerto de San Benito in the Tapachula municipality of the Soconusco region in the southern portion of the Mexican state of Chiapas. The port entrance lies about 13 kilometres (8.1 mi) northwest of the mouth of the Suchiate River which is the international boundary between Mexico and Guatemala. Puerto de San Benito is connected by Highway 225 to Tapachula International Airport and the city of Tapachula. Since its opening in 1975 the port has been a small fishing and agricultural transport center. Upgrades carried out in 2005 and since by the government have added facilities for cruise ships and more heavy cargo. Governor Pablo Salazar Mendiguchía had put interest in the original rustic and old port, and later Governor Juan Sabines Guerrero has ordered development of the true port in the hopes it will attract business to Chiapas, the poorest state in Mexico. Ships of the Holland America Line, Regent Seven Seas Cruises, Norwegian Cruise Line, Oceania Cruises and Princess Cruise Line stop at Port Chiapas.

== Cruise information ==
There is little of interest to the cruise passenger in the immediate vicinity of the port. There is a craft market as one leaves the dock, but the nearest town, Tapachula, is a few miles inland. Tours are available to Izapa which is a very large pre-Columbian archaeological site with several carved Maya stelae and monuments. Volcán Tacaná dominates the port's eastern horizon and a number of ruins and biological reservations are accessible from it.

== Gallery ==
Port Chiapas

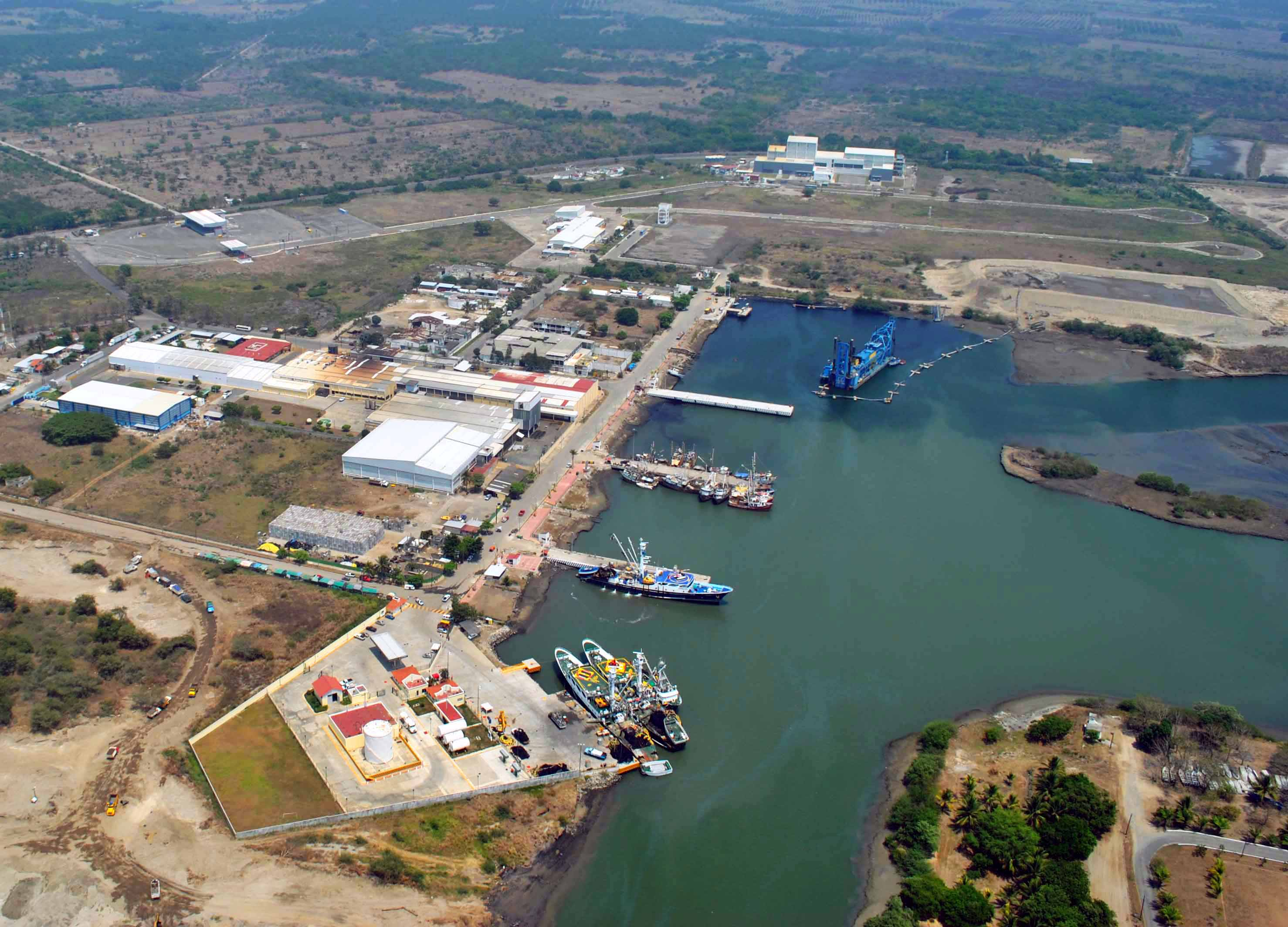

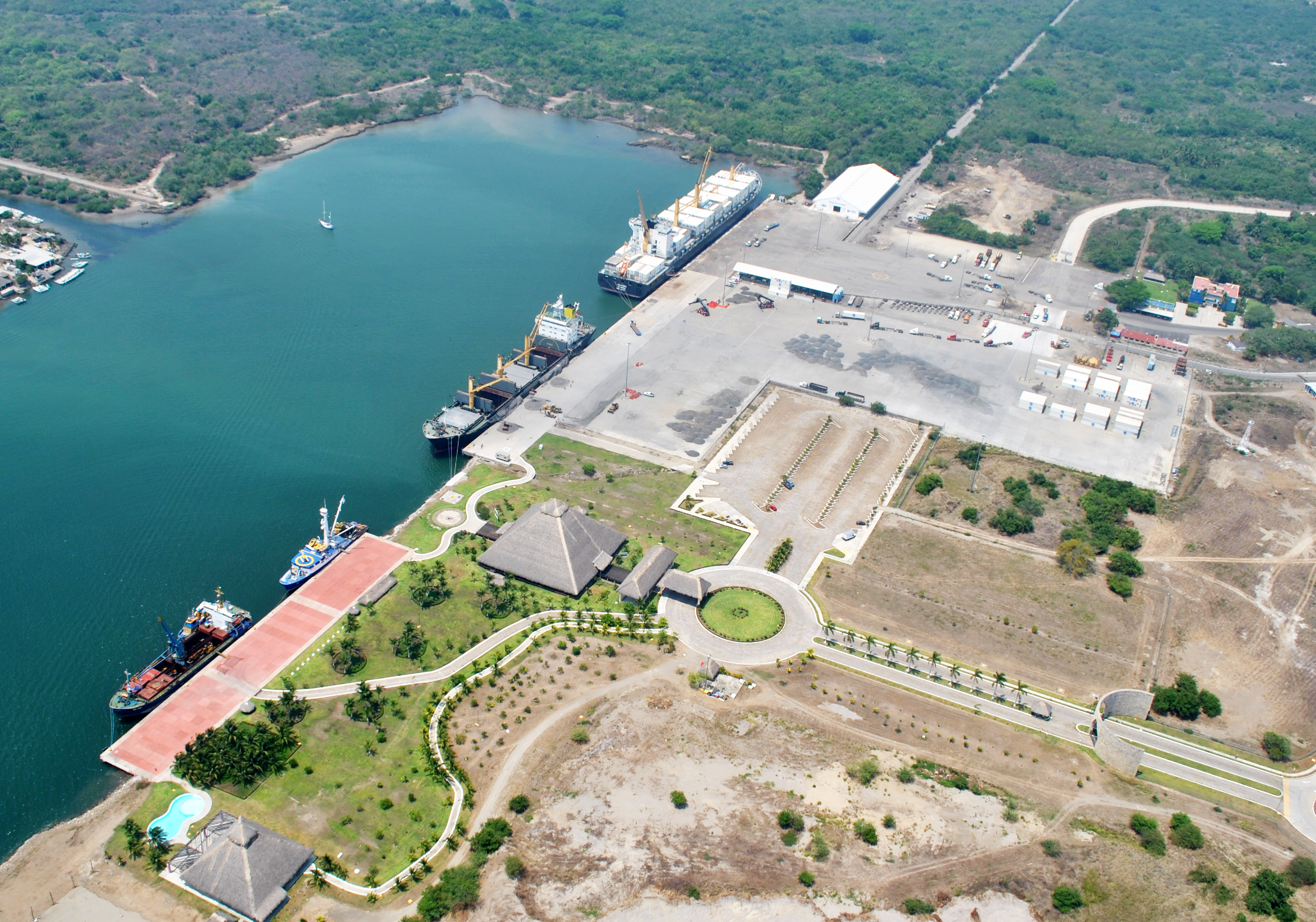

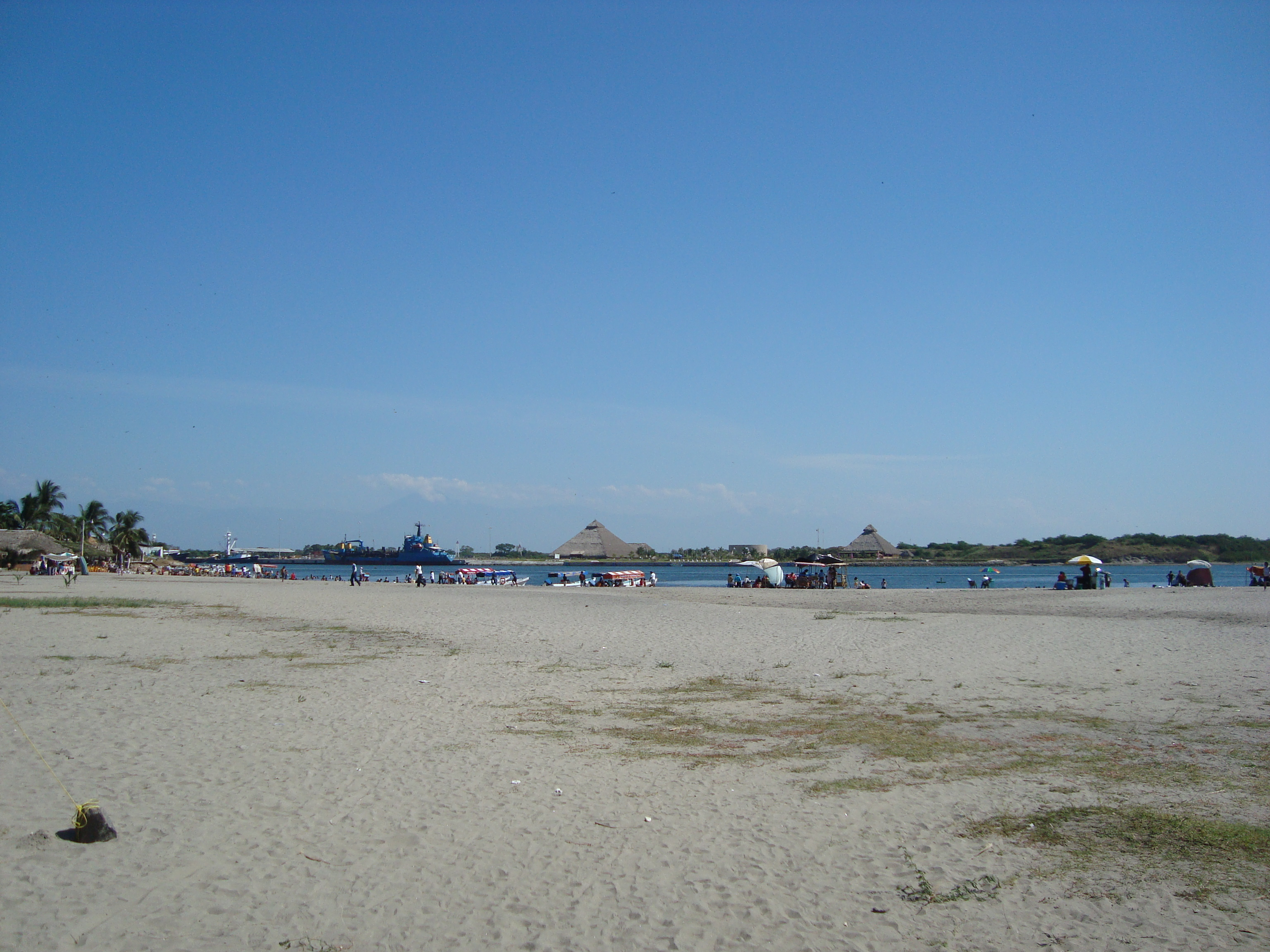

== See also ==
- Line K (Tren Interoceánico)
- Puente Rodolfo Robles
