= Fernel Gálvez Rodríguez =

Mexican politician

- Born: 11 January 1969 (age 57); Chiapas, Mexico
- Occupation: Politician
- Political party: PRD

Fernel Arturo Gálvez Rodríguez (born 11 January 1969) is a Mexican politician affiliated with the Party of the Democratic Revolution. As of 2014 he served as Deputy of the LX Legislature of the Mexican Congress representing Chiapas.
