= Ayutla, San Marcos =

Ayutla
- Municipality
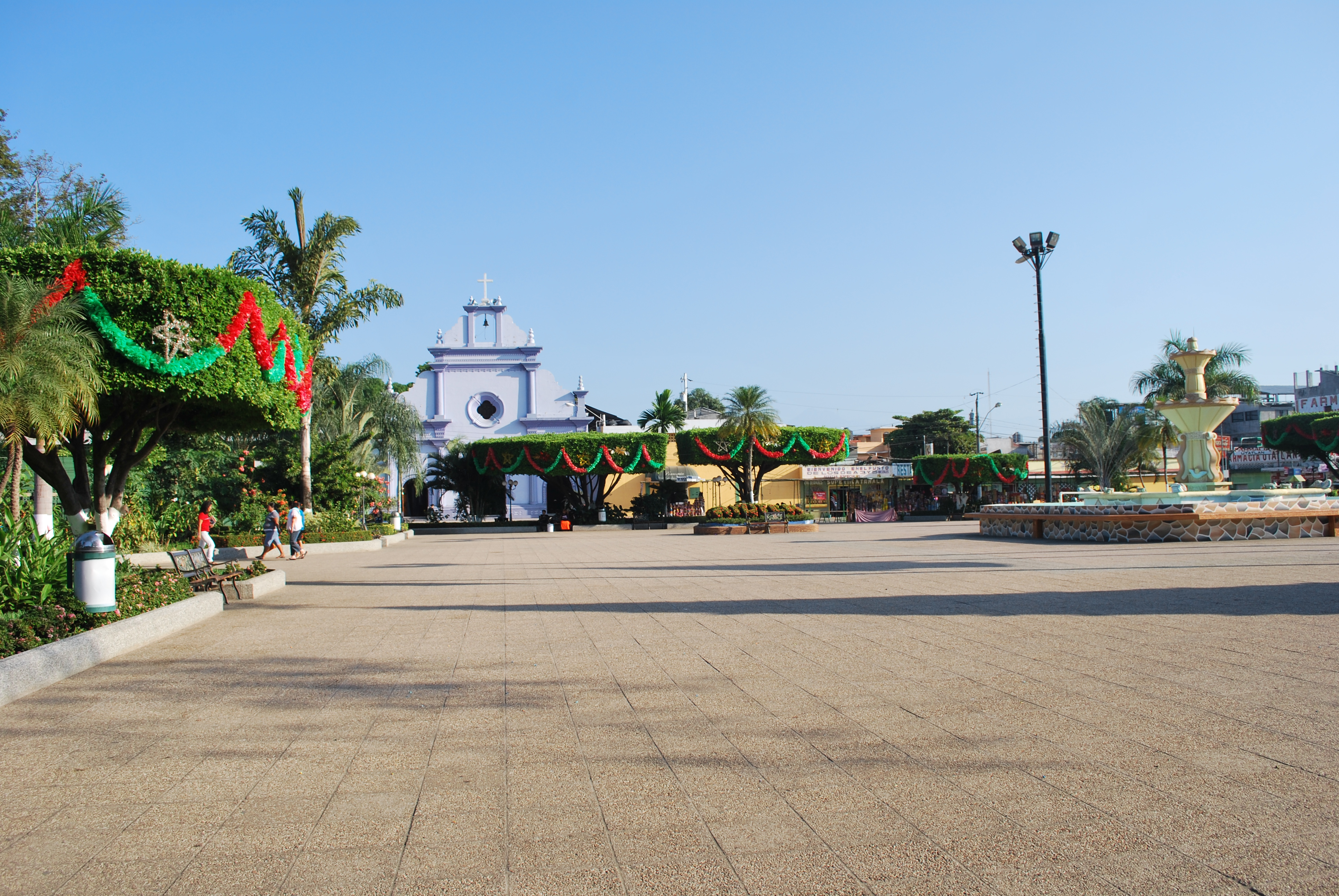
- Main plaza and church in Ciudad Tecún Umán

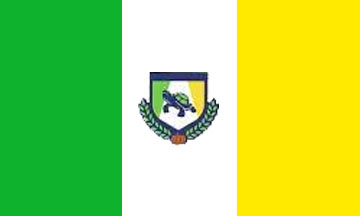
- Flag

- Location in Guatemala
- Coordinates: 14°40′41″N 92°08′31″W
- Country: Guatemala
- Department: San Marcos
- Municipal Seat: Ciudad Tecún Umán

Government
  - Mayor (2024-2028): Isel Suñiga (Ind.)

Area
  - Municipality: 125 km^{2} (48 sq mi)

Population (2018 census)
  - Municipality: 37,049
  - Density: 296/km^{2} (768/sq mi)
  - Urban: 23,574
- Climate: Aw

Ayutla (Spanish pronunciation: [aˈʝutla]) is a municipality in the San Marcos Department of Guatemala. It is situated along the Suchiate River natural border with Mexico in the southern part of the department. The municipality center is Ciudad Tecún Umán. There is a combined road and rail bridge known as Puente Rodolfo Robles linking Ayutla to Ciudad Hidalgo in Chiapas, Mexico.

There exists a railway which was rebuilt in 2019.

In December 2019, the U.S. Treasury Department sanctioned Ayutla's mayor, Erick Zúñiga, under the Foreign Narcotics Kingpin Designation Act, alleging Zúñiga to be "a major drug trafficker," while also alleging that Zúñiga controls a drug trafficking organization and "supplies cocaine to Mexico's Sinaloa Cartel."

== Climate ==
Ayutla has tropical savanna climate (Köppen: Aw).

Climate data for Ayutla
Month	Jan	Feb	Mar	Apr	May	Jun	Jul	Aug	Sep	Oct	Nov	Dec	Year
Mean daily maximum °C (°F)	34.5 (94.1)	34.9 (94.8)	35.9 (96.6)	35.8 (96.4)	35.2 (95.4)	33.7 (92.7)	34.2 (93.6)	34.3 (93.7)	33.8 (92.8)	33.8 (92.8)	33.8 (92.8)	33.9 (93.0)	34.5 (94.1)
Daily mean °C (°F)	27.1 (80.8)	27.4 (81.3)	28.7 (83.7)	29.3 (84.7)	29.2 (84.6)	28.3 (82.9)	28.5 (83.3)	28.5 (83.3)	28.3 (82.9)	28.3 (82.9)	27.8 (82.0)	27.2 (81.0)	28.2 (82.8)
Mean daily minimum °C (°F)	19.7 (67.5)	20.0 (68.0)	21.5 (70.7)	22.8 (73.0)	23.3 (73.9)	22.9 (73.2)	22.8 (73.0)	22.7 (72.9)	22.8 (73.0)	22.8 (73.0)	21.8 (71.2)	20.5 (68.9)	22.0 (71.5)
Average precipitation mm (inches)	4 (0.2)	1 (0.0)	8 (0.3)	53 (2.1)	139 (5.5)	293 (11.5)	201 (7.9)	205 (8.1)	295 (11.6)	225 (8.9)	51 (2.0)	6 (0.2)	1,481 (58.3)
Source: Climate-Data.org

== See also ==
- San Marcos Department
- Rail transport in Central America
- Rail transport in Guatemala
- Rail transport in Mexico
