= Francisco Grajales Palacios =

Mexican politician

- Born: 18 August 1956 (age 69); Tonalá, Chiapas, Mexico
- Occupation: Deputy
- Political party: PRI

Francisco Grajales Palacios (born 18 August 1956) is a Mexican politician affiliated with the PRI. He currently serves as Deputy of the LXII Legislature of the Mexican Congress representing Chiapas. He also served as Deputy during the LIX Legislature.
