= Guatemala City Railway Museum =

Museum in Guatemala City, Guatemala

The Guatemala City Railway Museum, officially Museo del Ferrocarril FEGUA, is located in the main railway station in Guatemala City, Guatemala.

The museum has a collection of steam and diesel locomotives, passenger carriages and other rolling stock and items connected with the railway. It also has information about the historic development of the railways in Guatemala.

== Gallery ==
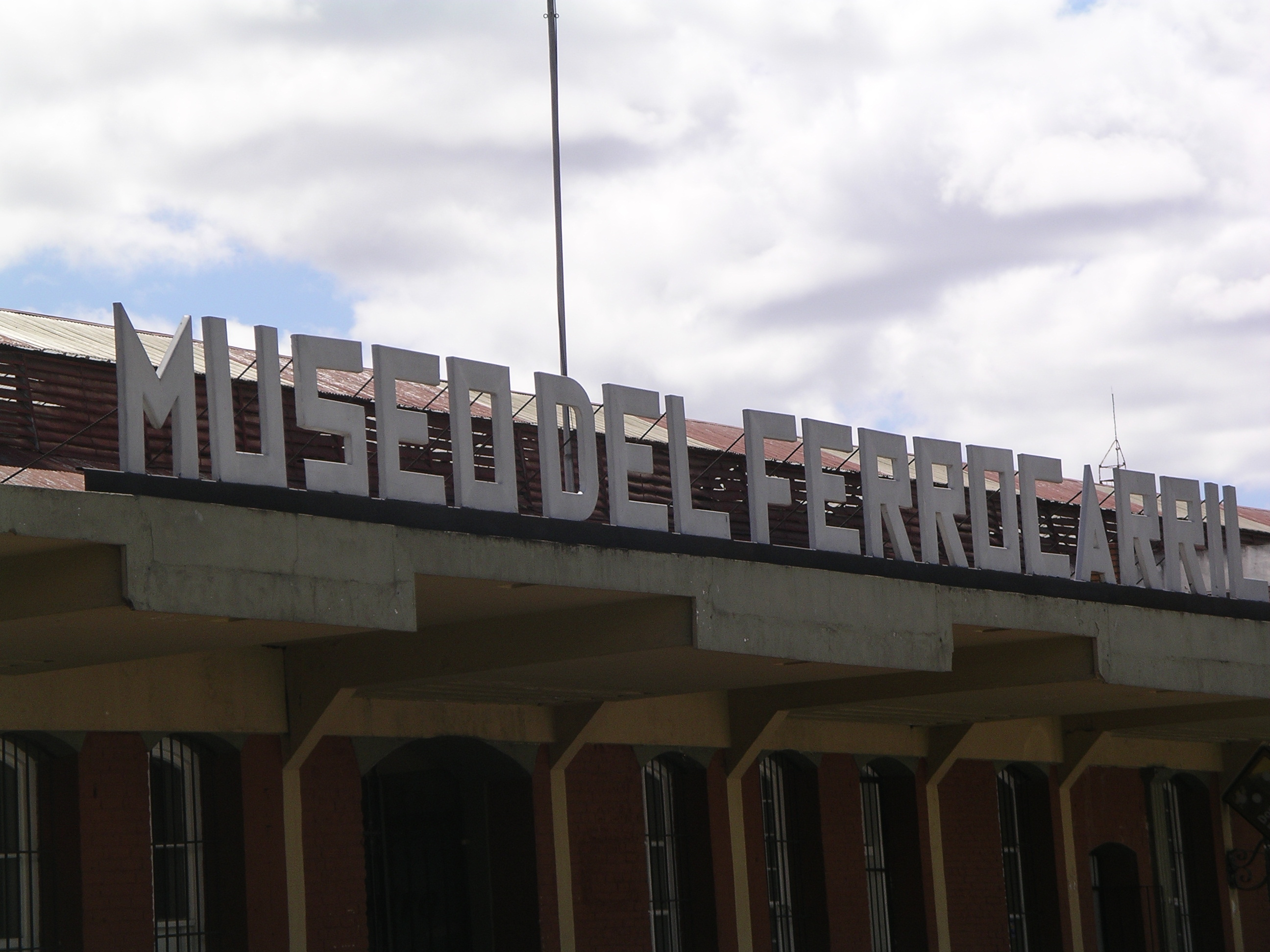
Guatemala City Railway Museum.

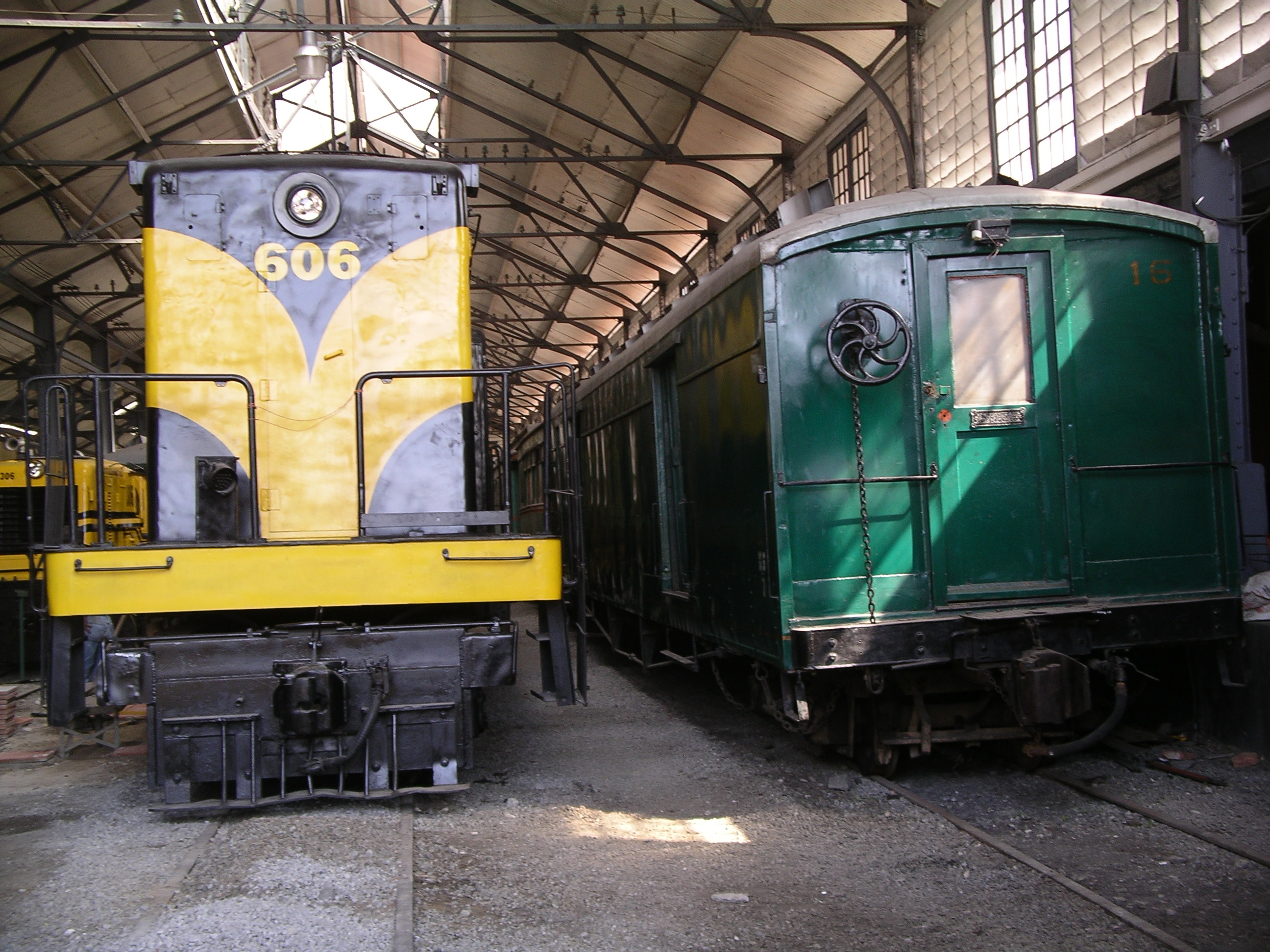
Diesel locomotive and carriage in GC Railway museum.

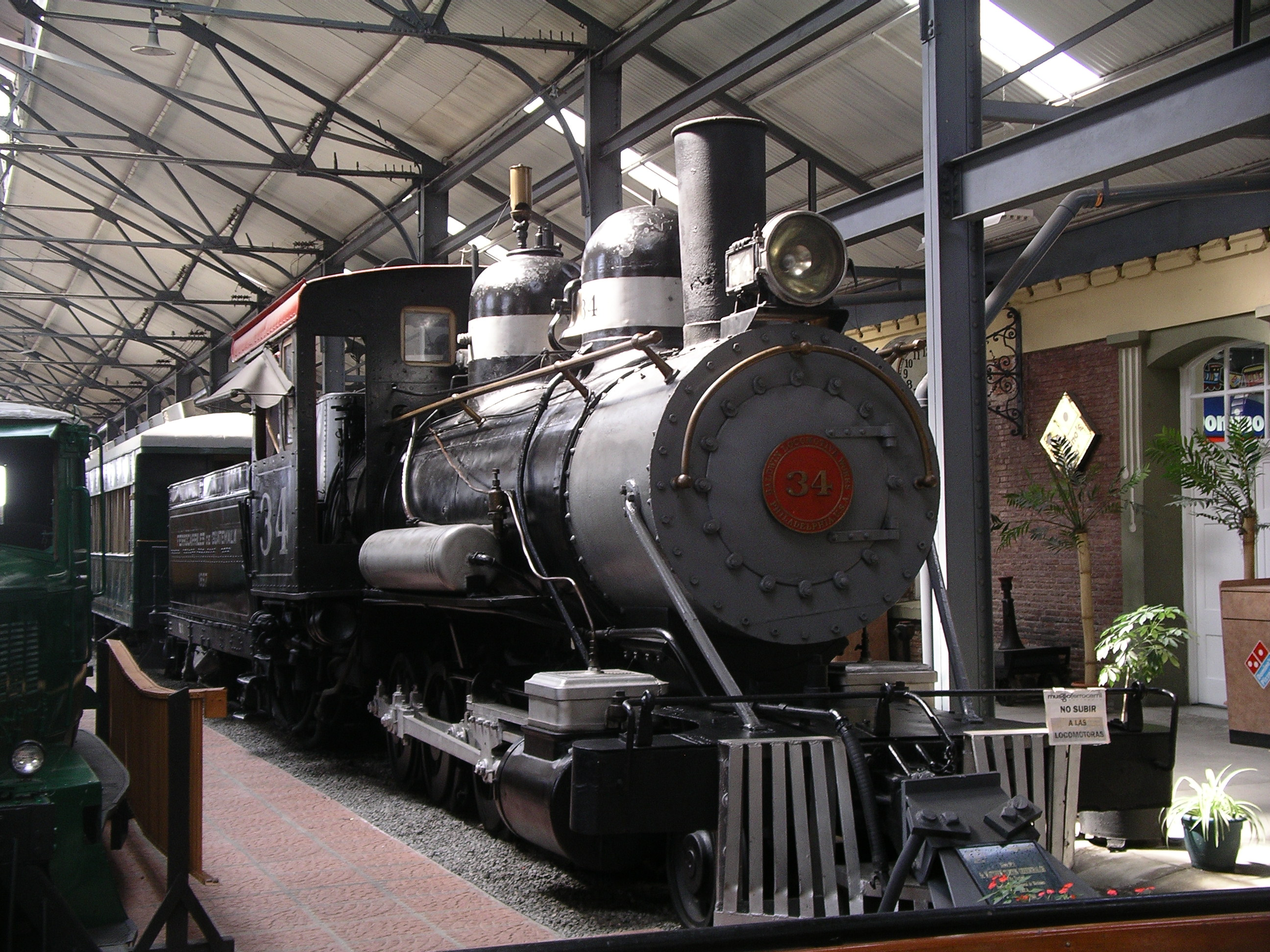
Steam locomotive No 34 in GC Railway museum.

== See also ==
- Rail transport in Guatemala
