= Suchiate River =

River in Guatemala

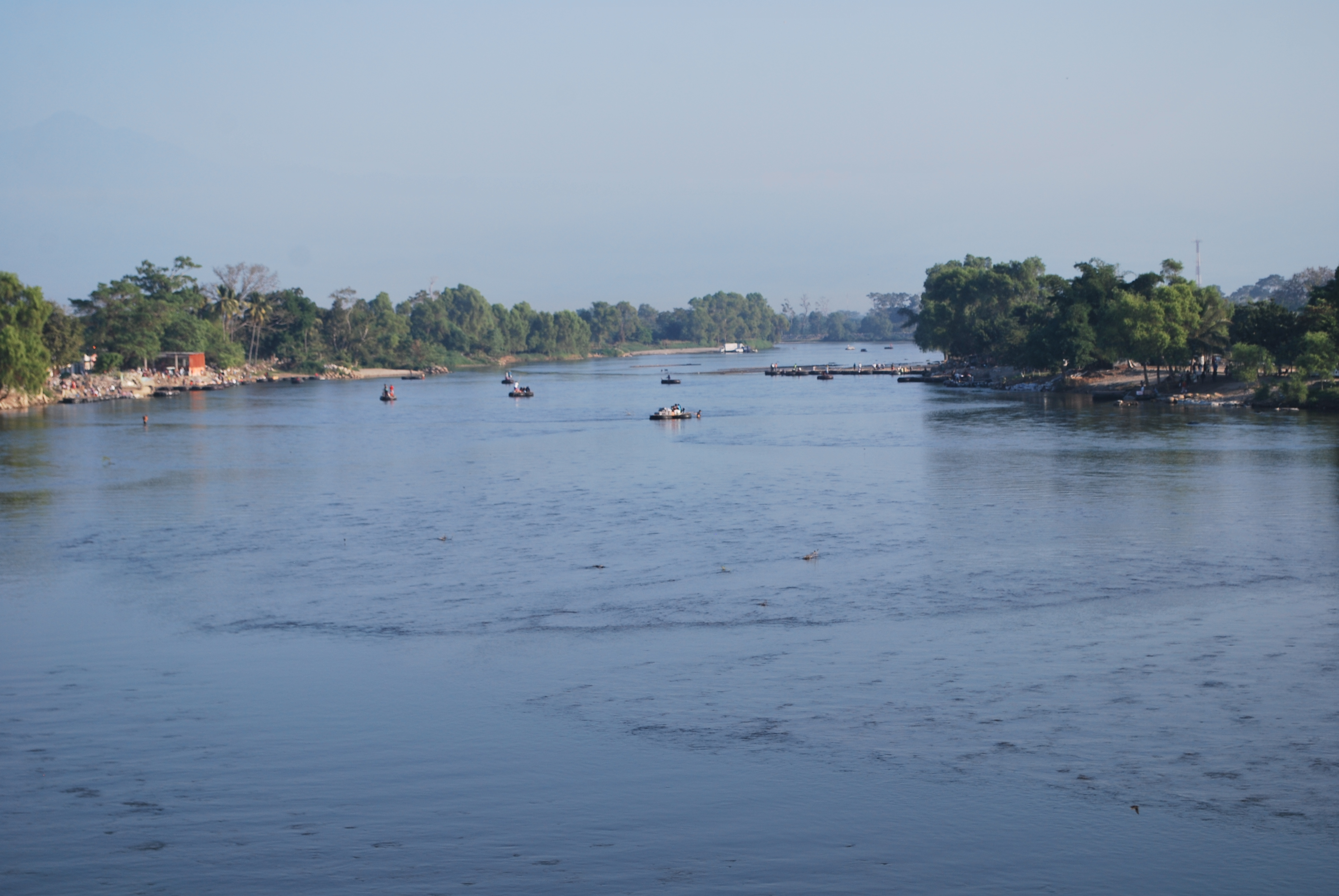
- Suchiate River from the border bridge between Ciudad Hidalgo and Ciudad Tecun Uman

- Map of the Suchiate River

- Location of mouth
- Native name: Río Suchiate (Spanish)

Location
- Countries: Guatemala and Mexico

Physical characteristics
- Source
  - location: Guatemala (San Marcos)
  - coordinates: 15°09′47″N 91°57′22″W
  - elevation: 3,000 m (9,800 ft)
- Mouth
  - location: Pacific Ocean
  - coordinates: 14°31′53″N 92°13′41″W
  - elevation: 0 m (0 ft)
- Length: 161 km (100 mi)
- Basin size: 1,400 km^{2} (540 mi^{2})

The Suchiate River (Spanish: Río Suchiate, Spanish pronunciation: [suˈtʃjate]) is a river that marks the southwesternmost part of the border between Mexico (state of Chiapas) and Guatemala (department of San Marcos). From its sources on the southern slopes of the Tacaná volcano in the Sierra Madre range of Guatemala, the 161 km (100 mi) long river flows in a south-southwesterly direction to the border with Mexico at Unión Juárez (15.070549°N 92.059722°W), past the border towns Talismán and El Carmen, and then Ciudad Tecún Umán and Ciudad Hidalgo (Chiapas) further downstream, where the Puente Rodolfo Robles and a railway bridge cross the river, and on to the Pacific Ocean. Its name comes from the Nahuatl name Xochiatl meaning "flower-water".

The pre-Columbian archaeological site of Izapa lies along the river.

== See also ==
- Rail transport in Guatemala
- Rail transport in Mexico
