= Patricia Aguilar García =

Mexican politician

- Born: 20 August 1952 (age 73); Mexico City, Mexico
- Occupation: Politician
- Political party: PRI

Patricia Aguilar García (Note: In this Mexican name, the surname is Aguilar and the second or maternal family name is García.) (born 20 August 1952) is a Mexican politician from the Institutional Revolutionary Party (PRI). From 2000 to 2003 she served as a deputy during the 58th Congress representing Chiapas.

== Career ==
After graduating in psychology from the National Autonomous University of Mexico (UNAM), in the 1970s she joined the Institutional Revolutionary Party, holding various positions throughout the 1980s and 1990s as Finance Coordinator and President of the Party's Thematic Commission. Linked to the government of the state of Chiapas, in 1989 she worked in positions such as General Director of Civil Protection and Rehabilitation, Coordinator of the Program for the Integration of Women in Development, Secretary of Rural Development and Private Secretary of the Secretary of Government. She began the 2000s representing the state as a deputy during the 58th Congress, also chairing the Commission of Population, Borders and Migratory Affairs.
