= José Manuel Marroquín Toledo =

Mexican politician

- Born: 1 August 1953 (age 72); Chiapas, Mexico
- Occupation: Politician
- Political party: PAN

José Manuel Marroquín Toledo (born 1 August 1953) is a Mexican politician from the National Action Party. From 2009 to 2012 he served as Deputy of the LXI Legislature of the Mexican Congress representing Chiapas.
