= Rail transport in Guatemala =

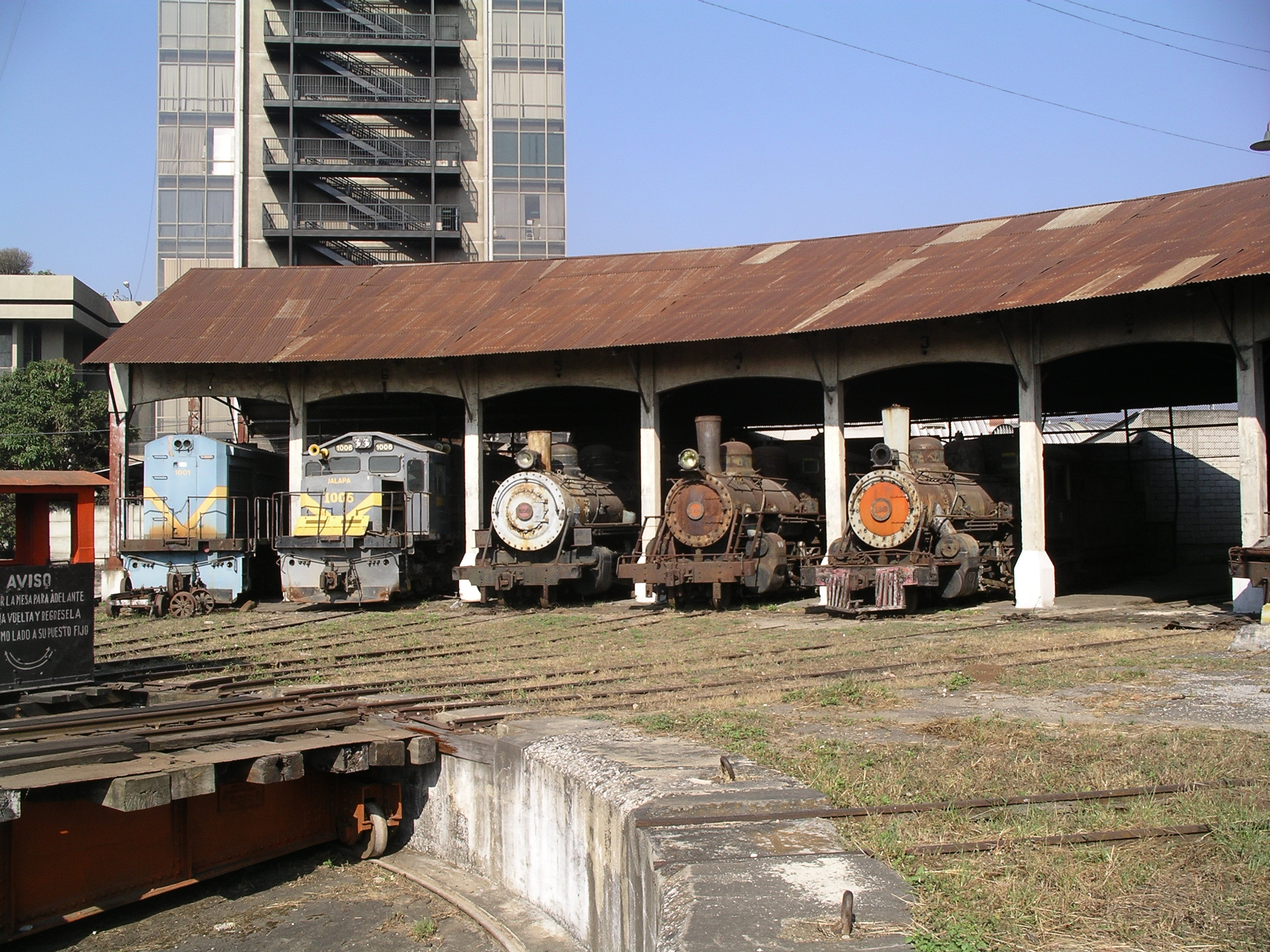
Roundhouse at Guatemala City Station with diesel and steam locomotives, 2007

Guatemala had a network of 914 mm (3 ft) narrow gauge railroads.

== History ==
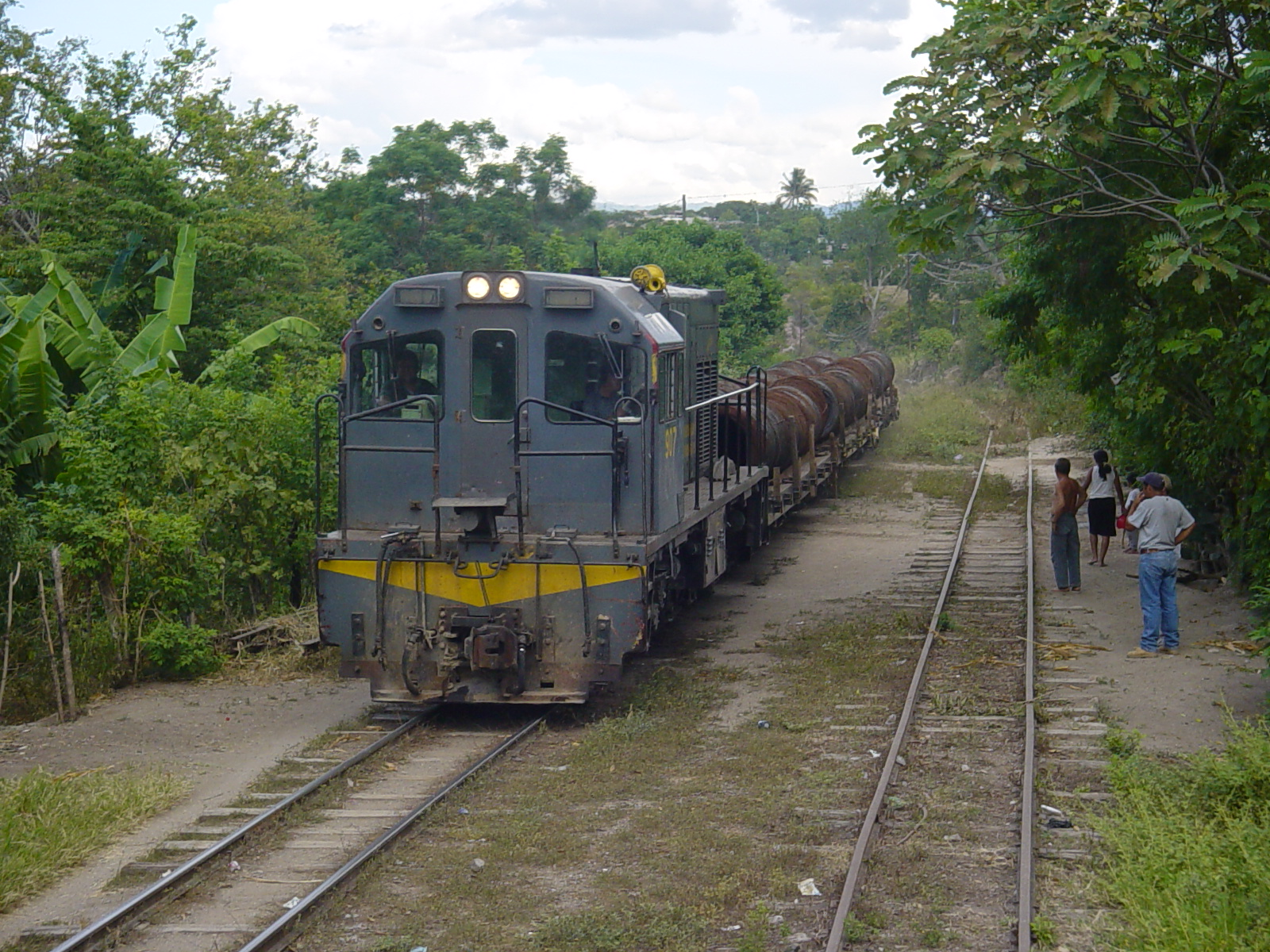
Freight transport was the main business of Ferrovías Guatemala.

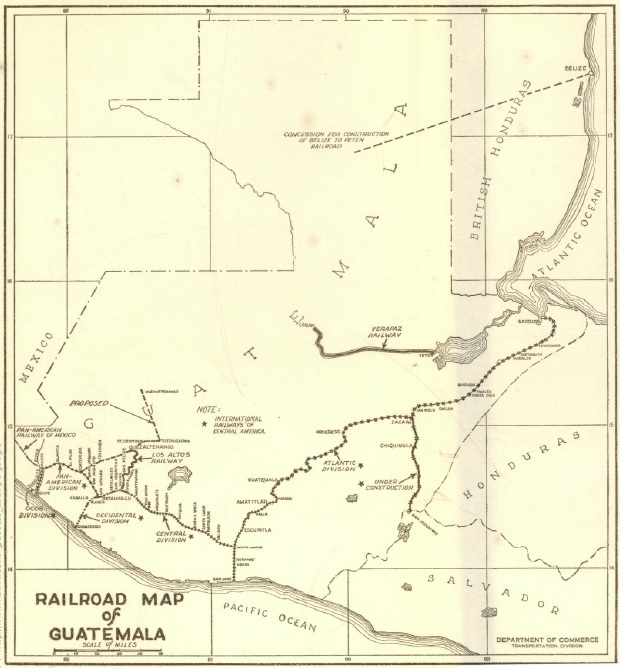
Guatemala rail map of 1925

On March 19, 1873, the Garcia Granada administration enacted a law to allow for construction of a railroad in Guatemala. Construction of the first railway in Guatemala commenced in 1878 and the first section began operation in 1880, connecting Puerto San José and Escuintla, being extended to Guatemala City in 1884.

The line to Puerto Barrios, known originally as Northern Railroad of Guatemala was completed in 1908. The network was soon acquired by United Fruit, and in 1912 renamed the International Railways of Central America which was also known as IRCA.

The railroad prospered until 1957. In 1954, United Fruit had to divest following an antitrust suit and in 1959, a parallel highway caused a serious competitive pressure. In 1968, the company defaulted, was taken over by the government and renamed Ferrocarriles de Guatemala which was also known as FEGUA. The condition of tracks continued to deteriorate and regular traffic was shut down in 1996.

=== Revival ===
In October 1997, a 50-year concession was given to Railroad Development Corporation (RDC) which started to rehabilitate the network. They were delayed by the need to evict squatters who built their cottages on the right-of-way during the previous years and to repair damage caused by thieves and nature. A serious blow was Hurricane Mitch in 1998, which destroyed parts of the line. The first train under RDC management went from Guatemala City to El Chile cement plant on April 15, 1999, and the rest of the line to Puerto Barrios was put into operation in December of that year.

From 1999 until September 2007, Ferrovías Guatemala (FVG), as a subsidiary of RDC, operated 15 engines and 200 railcars on freight trains between Guatemala City and Puerto Barrios. It transported containers, steel, cement, paper and bananas between the Caribbean coast and the capital over a network of 320 kilometres (200 mi) as of 2006, but quit in September 2007. It connected Guatemala City to Puerto Barrios with short branches in Guatemala City container terminal and Puerto Santo Tomás.

Steam charter trains ran on parts of the network in the period 1997 to 2007.

Other lines previously existing in Guatemala (such as to Ciudad Tecún Umán on the border with Mexico, to Anguiatú in El Salvador and to Puerto San José) have not been repaired since 1996.

A short cross-border link from Ciudad Hidalgo, Chiapas in Mexico to Ciudad Tecún Umán was rebuilt with 1,435 mm (4 ft 8 1/2 in) standard gauge in 2019, and plans are ongoing to connect it with Line K of the Tren Interoceánico, officially bringing back international passenger and freight rail services to the nation's western border.

=== Suspension of operations in 2007 ===
In August 2006, the government of Guatemala declared a 2003 contract for the usufruct of rolling stock and other equipment as contrary to public interest (es:Declaración de lesividad), invalidating it. FVG believed that this was a response to its earlier request for arbitration regarding the usage of US$2 million from National Railroad Trust, designated for the development of railroads in Guatemala but used to support an overstaffed governmental oversight agency.

The result of the governmental action was a decline of shipments and operational difficulties, such as inability to obtain credit or take additional revenues from the leasing of station buildings or right of way. In March 2007, RDC declared its intent to seek protection of investment through arbitration against the government of Guatemala according to Chapter 10 of CAFTA. The case was registered with ICSID on August 20, 2007, with number ARB/07/23. Due to the continuing uncertainty leading to losses, FVG decided to suspend all operations as of October 1, 2007, while continuing with legal actions against the Guatemalan government. The arbitration case was finally decided in favor of RDC and US$14.6m paid as compensation. As of 2011, most of the bridges have been dismantled and sold for scrap by thieves, making a potential revival of railways in Guatemala difficult, as it would cost millions of dollars to rebuild.

In August 2012, there were proposals to start some new passenger services, including a link from La Aurora airport to Guatemala City.

== Historic Network ==
The following table shows the main rail network and linked plantation railways (mostly United Fruit Company) at its historic extent and is based on the source work with additional original research. Details of the plantation railways are vague. An incomplete series of 1:50,000 maps are held by / published online by The University of Texas under the Perry-Castañeda Library (PCL) Map Collection website

Table of historic railway network
Location	Section Distance (km)	Cumulative Distance (km)	Note
Puerto Barrios	0	0	
(junction)	4	4	
Entre Rios	19	23	
Bananera	36	59	
Quirigua	36	95	
Zacapa	70	165	
Guatemala City	151	316	
Santa Maria	88	404	
Rio Bravo	68	472	
Palo Gordo	17	489	
Mulua	26	515	
Las Cruces	21	536	
Tecun Uman	64	600	Link to Mexico
(junction)	0	0	
Santo Tomás de Castilla	6	6	estimated by Google measure
Entre Rios	0	0	
La Inca	26	26	
El Quetzalito	10	36	estimated by Google measure, plus additional plantation lines. Source: Open Street Map "antigua linea ferrea" (ancient iron line)
Bananera	0	0	
Oneida Empalme	4	4	
Quirigua	36	40	plus additional plantation lines
Oneida Empalme	0	0	
Playitas area	60	60	estimated by Google measure, approximately 60 km network of lines serving fruit plantations
Zacapa	0	0	
Anguiatu	113	113	link to El Salvador
Guatemala City	0	0	
Guarda Viejo	4	4	
Santa Maria	0	0	
El Empalme			
San Jose	33	33	
Puerto Quetzal	7	7	branch from El Empalme, Google measure based on historic map (ref 2057iv)
Rio Bravo	0	0	
Empalme Sur	42	42	Tiquisate plantation
Palo Gordo	0	0	
San Antonio	5	5	
Mulua	0	0	
San Felipe	15	15	
Las Cruces	0	0	
Champerico	29	29	
Tecun Uman	0	0	
Ocos	21	21	
Ferrocarril de Los Altos
San Felipe			
Quetzaltenango	45	45	
Ferrocarril Verapaz
Panzós	0	0	
Pancajche	45	45	

== Ferrocarril de Los Altos ==
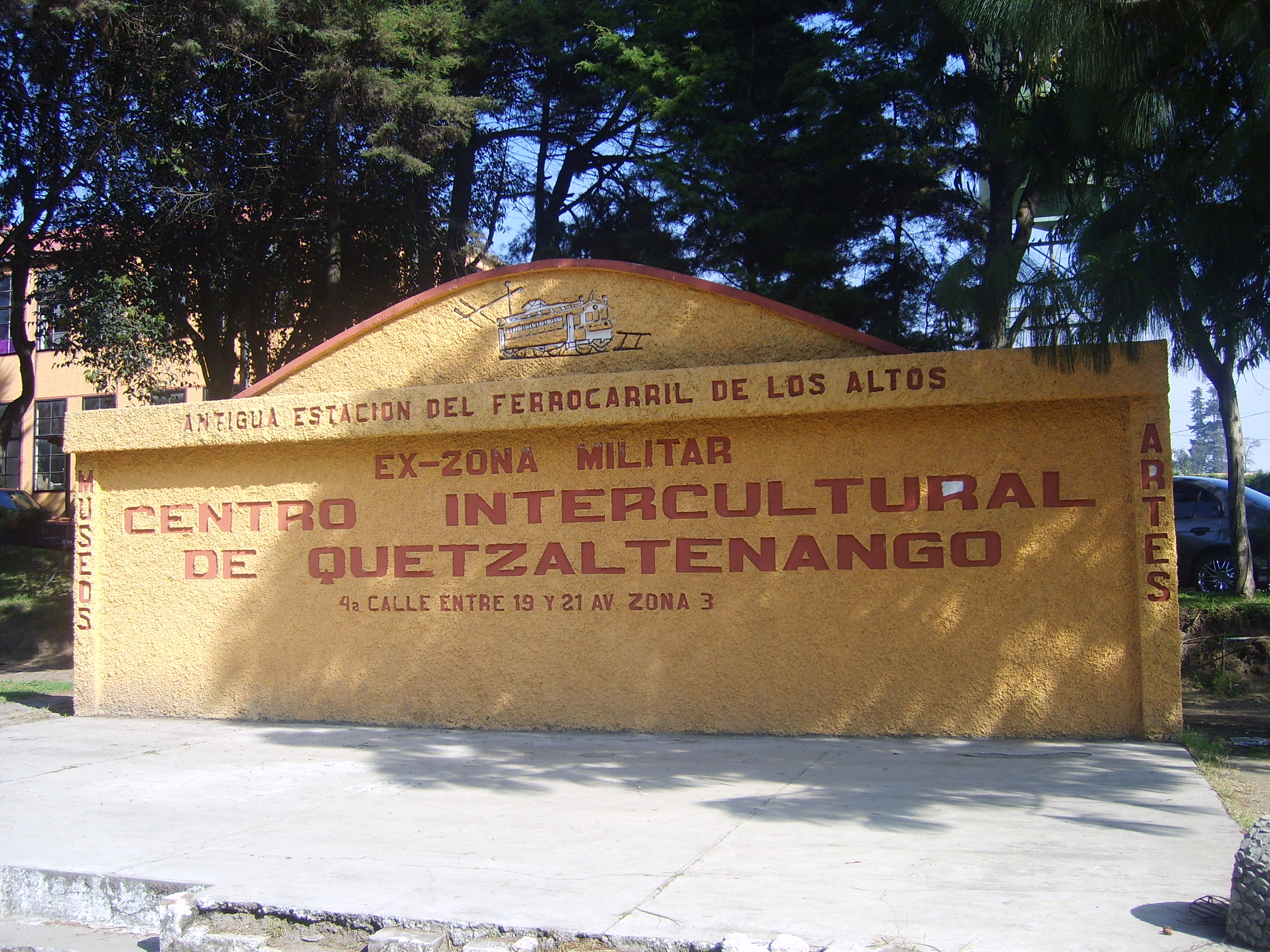
The site of a former train station in Quetzaltenango

Outside of the IRCA network, an electric railroad Ferrocarril de Los Altos used to connect Quetzaltenango and Retalhuleu between 1930 and 1933. It was destroyed by a hurricane in 1933 and never rebuilt. The remains are on display in a dedicated museum in Quetzaltenango (Ferrocarril de Los Altos).

== Ferrocarril Verapaz ==
Another isolated railroad, Ferrocarril Verapaz de Guatemala (also known as Ferropazco), used to connect Panzós and Tucurú in Alta Verapaz Department. Its construction was authorized in 1884 and completed in 1895. Its main purpose was to transport coffee from farms (fincas) controlled mainly by Germans to the port of Panzós on Polochic River, which merged to Lago de Izabal and the Caribbean Sea. The company was nationalized in 1943. In 1956, the government created a national company Ferrocarril Verapaz y Servicios Anexos. Operations along Ferrocarril Verapaz y Servicios Anexos stopped in 1963.

== Tourist trains ==
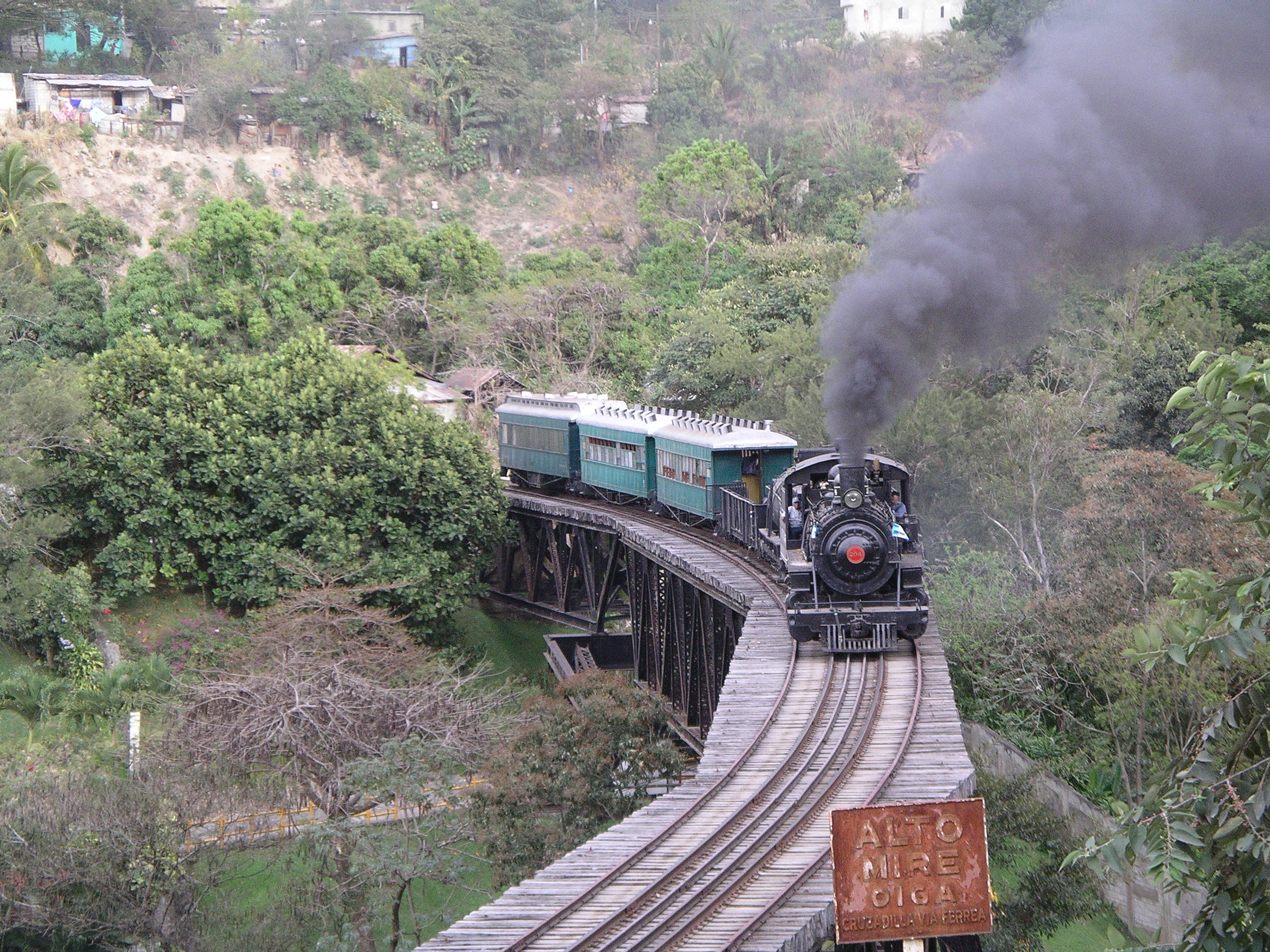
Tourist train, 2007

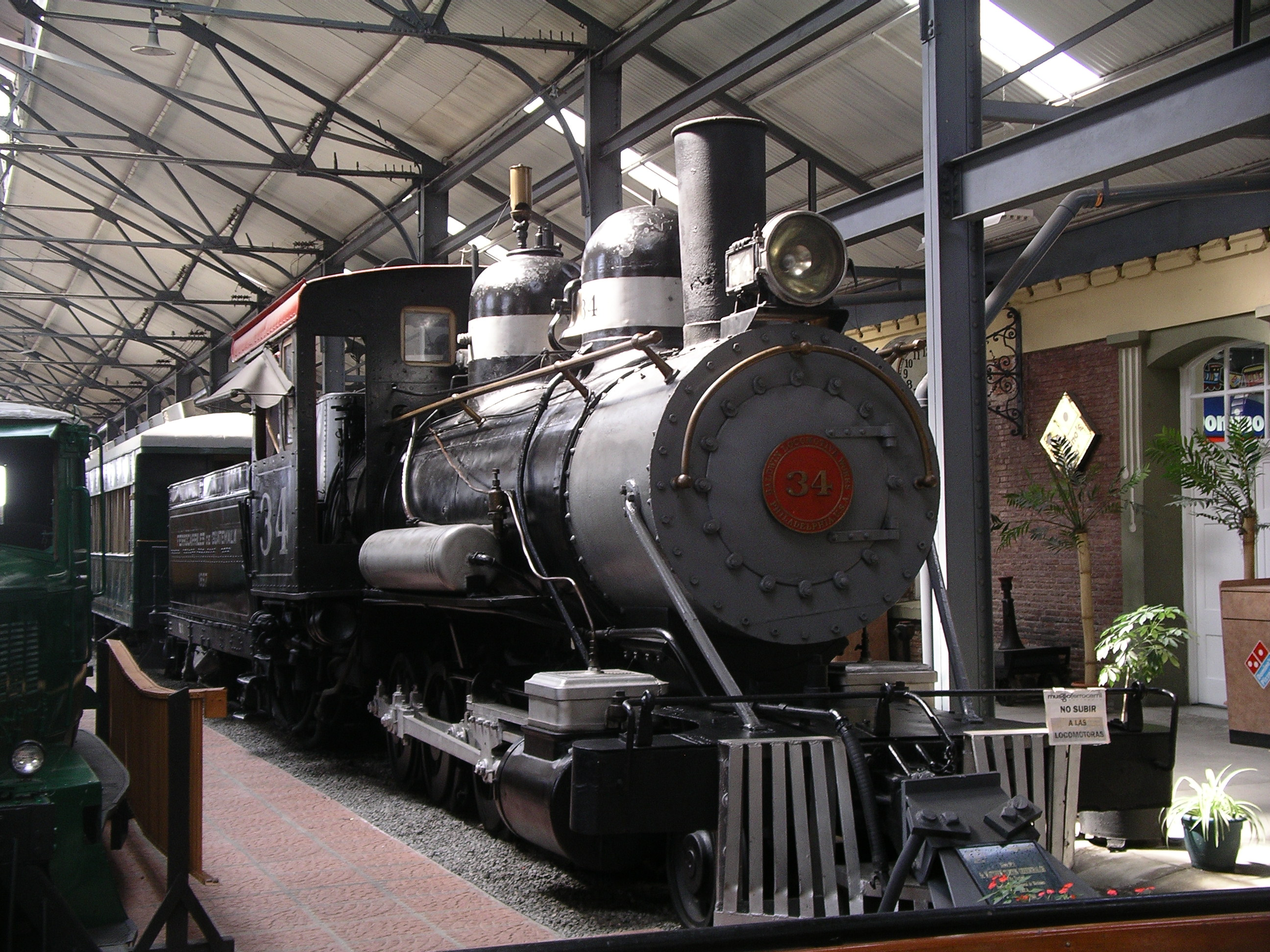
Old steam engine in the Guatemala City Railway Museum

Charter passenger trains with steam engines, mainly for tourists, were organized usually once a year by UK based Ffestiniog Travel or other operators. Traffic control used a modified Track warrant Control method. The main station in Guatemala city also serves as railroad museum.

== Railway museum ==
The Museo del Ferrocarril FEGUA is located in the railway station at Guatemala City and displays steam engines, a diesel engine, passenger and freight cars, and other memorabilia of the Ferrocarriles de Guatemala.

== Proposed light rail ==
A light rail system called Metro Riel is planned for Guatemala City. The project, also known as the White Line, would run 21 kilometres along a north south corridor on the former FEGUA heavy rail alignment, connecting the Centra Sur transfer terminal in Zone 12 to the Centra Norte terminal in Zone 18, with approximately 20 stations across five zones of the capital. A feasibility study completed in 2016 by Spanish engineering firm IDOM estimated the total project cost at $770 million USD and projected daily ridership of over 250,000 passengers at peak capacity. In 2019, the municipality of Guatemala City and state railway manager Ferrovías signed an agreement formalising the right of way for the project, with the Inter American Development Bank providing technical assistance to FEGUA for structuring the public - private partnership. As of 2024, the project remained in pre-construction phase, with preliminary works underway and a targeted opening of the first phase in mid-2027, though financing and institutional coordination between national and municipal authorities continued to present challenges.

== Railway links with adjacent countries ==
- Mexico – at Ciudad Tecún Umán break of gauge 914 mm (3 ft)/1,435 mm (4 ft 8 1/2 in) standard gauge. (rebuilt as standard gauge in 2019)
- There is no connection to Belize or Honduras
- The former link to El Salvador – at Angulatú/San Jerónimo – is not active.

== See also ==
- Guatemala
- Transportation in Guatemala
- Rail transport by country
