= Ciudad Hidalgo, Chiapas =

Ciudad Hidalgo (formerly: Mariscal; Mariscal Suchiate; Suchiate)
- City

- Municipality of Suchiate in Chiapas

- Location in Mexico
- Coordinates: 14°40′45″N 92°08′59″W
- Country: Mexico
- State: Chiapas
- Municipality: Suchiate
- Founded: 1882
- Village status: 4 July 1925
- City status: 24 July 1952
- Elevation: 20 m (66 ft)

Population (2010)
  - Total: 14,606
- Postal code: 30840
- Area code: 962

Ciudad Hidalgo is a city in the Mexican state of Chiapas. It serves as the municipal seat of the surrounding municipality of Suchiate which is the southernmost in Mexico. In the 2010 INEGI Census, it reported a population of 14,606 inhabitants.

It is the main crossing point on the international border with Guatemala. The Puente Rodolfo Robles, a road-rail bridge, over the Río Suchiate joins it with the Guatemalan city of Ciudad Tecún Umán in the municipality of Ayutla, San Marcos department.

== History ==
Ciudad Hidalgo was founded in 1882 by a group of settlers from Ayutla, San Marcos, who did not wish to remain on the Guatemalan side of the border following adoption of the border treaty of 27 September 1882 between the nations. The new settlement arose on what had been a hacienda called Los Cerros; it was known as either Suchiate, after the Río Suchiate, or Ignacio Mariscal, after a local landowner. On 4 July 1925 Suchiate was given village (pueblo) status and the municipality of Suchiate was formed. On 24 July 1952, under Governor Francisco J. Grajales, the town of Suchiate was given city status and its name changed to Ciudad Hidalgo, in honour of Fr. Miguel Hidalgo y Costilla.

== Transportation ==
Tren Interoceánico plans to build a station for its Line K in Ciudad Hidalgo. It will be the last station on Line K before it crosses the border with Guatemala. The second phase of this line, which includes this station, is scheduled to open in mid-2025.

Future services
Preceding station	Tren Interoceánico	Following station
Tapachula toward Salina Cruz	Line K	Terminus
Former services
Preceding station	N de M	Following station
El Campito toward Ixtepec	Ixtepec–Ciudad Hidalgo Line	through to Guatemalan railways at Ciudad Tecún Umán

== See also ==
- Port Chiapas
- Rail transport in Mexico
- Rail transport in Guatemala
