= Villa Comaltitlán =

- Municipality
- Municipality of Villa Comaltitlan in Chiapas

- Location in Mexico
- Coordinates: 15°13′N 92°34′W
- Country: Mexico
- State: Chiapas

Area
  - Total: 28 sq mi (72 km^{2})

Population (2010)
  - Total: 27,899

Villa Comaltitlán is a town and municipality in the Mexican state of Chiapas in southern Mexico.

As of 2010, the municipality had a total population of 27,899, up from 26,706 as of 2005. It covers an area of 72 km^{2}.

As of 2010, the town of Villa Comaltitlán had a population of 7,201. Other than the town of Villa Comaltitlán, the municipality had 172 localities, the largest of which (with 2010 populations in parentheses) were: Hidalgo (1,640), Lázaro Cárdenas (1,531), and Zacualpa (1,076), classified as rural.
