= List of named passenger trains of Mexico =

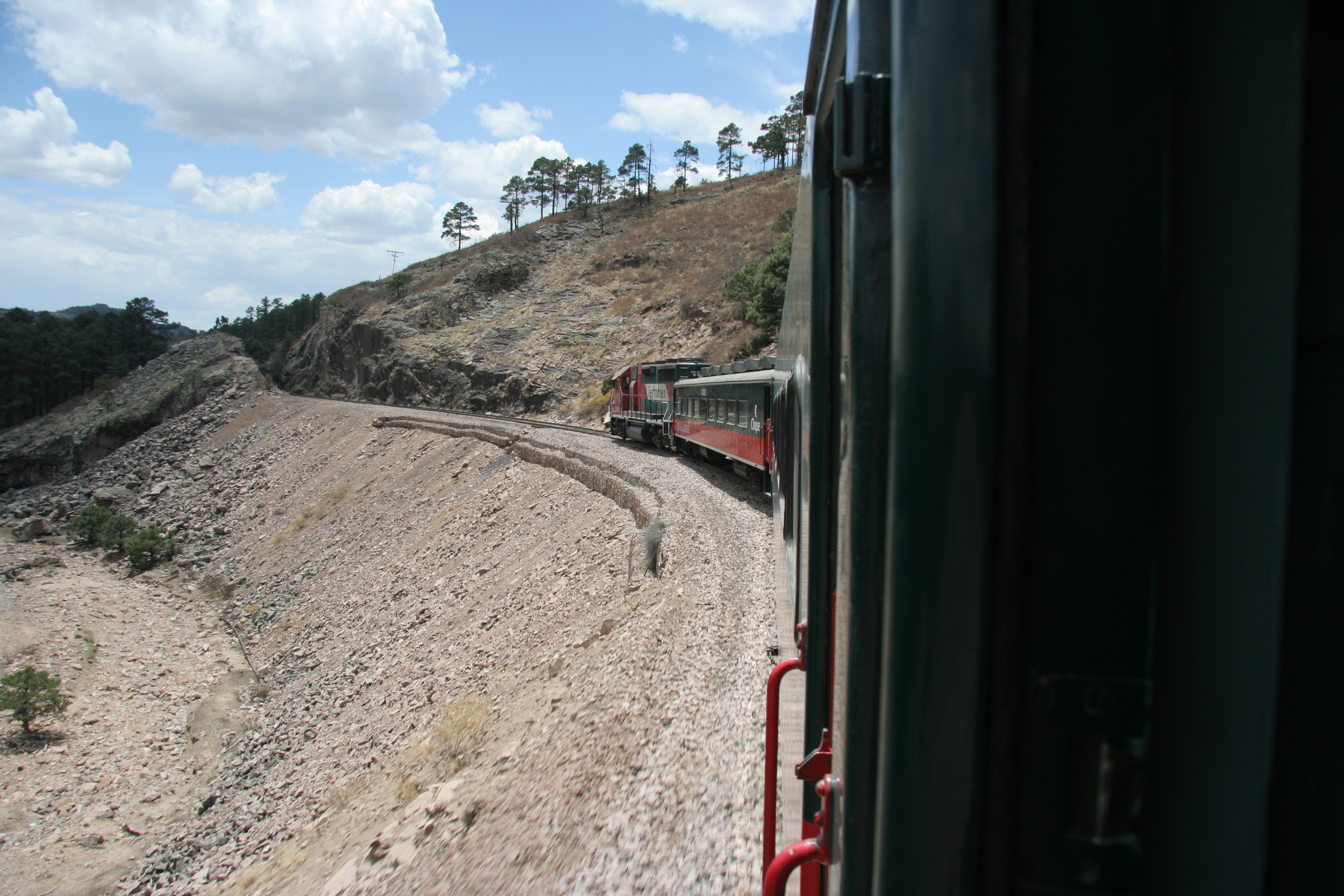
El ChePe train halfway between Anáhuac and Creel in Chihuahua, 16 May 2006

There have been a number of named passenger trains in Mexico. The named trains that are operating include:

Operating Train Name	Railroad	Train Endpoints	started
ChePe	Chihuahua al Pacífico and Ferromex	Chihuahua, Chihuahua – Los Mochis, Sinaloa	1928 (partial service); 1961 (line completed)
Tequila Express	Ferromex	Guadalajara, Jalisco – Amatitán, Jalisco	1997
El Insurgente		Zinacantepec, Mexico - Lerma, Mexico	2023
Interoceanico		Salina Cruz, Oaxaca - Coatzacoalcos, Veracruz	2023
Tren Maya		Cancún, Quintana Roo - Palenque, Chiapas	2023

Former named trains include:

Train Name	Railroad	Train Endpoints	Operated
Autovía	Ferrocarriles Nacionales de México	Chihuahua, Chihuahua – Ciudad Juárez, Chihuahua	
Aztec Eagle (Águila Azteca)	Ferrocarriles Nacionales de México and Missouri Pacific Railroad	Mexico City, Distrito Federal – Nuevo Laredo, Tamaulipas – San Antonio, Texas	
El Costeno	Ferrocarril del Pacifico	Nogales, Sonora – Guadalajara, Jalisco	operated from 1927 until 1949 as an international train under the subsidiary Southern Pacific Railroad of Mexico between Tucson, Arizona and Guadalajara in Mexico featuring through sleepers on the Argonaut from Los Angeles, California to Mexico City in Mexico
Jarocho	Ferrocarriles Nacionales de México	Mexico City, Distrito Federal – Veracruz, Veracruz	
Presidente Juárez	Ferrocarriles Nacionales de México	Mexico City, Distrito Federal – El Paso, Texas	
El Fronterizo	Ferrocarriles Nacionales de México	Ciudad Juárez, Chihuahua – Mexico City, Distrito Federal	coordinated to meet at El Paso with the Southern Pacific's Golden State (east from Los Angeles and west to Los Angeles)
El Meridano	Ferrocarriles Nacionales de México and Ferrocarriles Unidos del Sureste	Mexico City, Distrito Federal – Mérida, Yucatán	
El Mexicali	Ferrocarril Sonora – Baja California and Ferrocarril del Pacifico	Mexicali, Baja California/Nogales, Sonora – Guadalajara, Jalisco	
Nuevo Regiomontano	Ferrocarriles Nacionales de México	Mexico City, Distrito Federal – Nuevo Laredo, Tamaulipas	
La Oaxaqueña	Ferrocarriles Nacionales de México	Mexico City, Distrito Federal – Oaxaca, Oaxaca	
Purépecha	Ferrocarriles Nacionales de México	Mexico City, Distrito Federal – Uruapan, Michoacán	
Regiomontano	Ferrocarriles Nacionales de México	Mexico City, Distrito Federal – Monterrey, Nuevo León	
Tapatío	Ferrocarriles Nacionales de México	Mexico City, Distrito Federal – Guadalajara, Jalisco	– 1996

== See also ==
- List of Mexican railroads
- Rail transport in Mexico
