= Tequila railway station =

Coordinates: 20°52′20″N 103°50′33″W

Tequila

General information
- Location: Tequila, Jalisco; Mexico
- Owner: Ferromex
- Line: Line T
- Platforms: 1
- Tracks: 3

Services
Preceding station	Ferromex	Following station
Terminus	Tequila Express	Guadalajara Terminus
Location

Tequila is a train station located in Tequila, Jalisco. The station is surrounded by agaves and is currently only served by the Tequila Express tourist train.
