= Guadalajara railway station (Mexico) =

Railway station in Guadalajara, Mexico

Coordinates: 20.6563°N 103.3521°W

Guadalajara
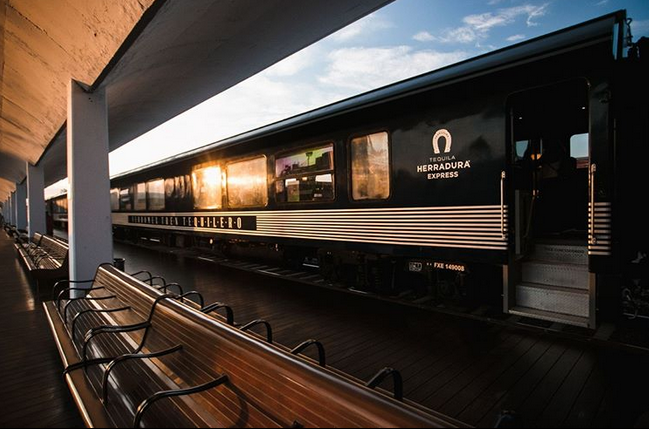
- Cars of the Tequila Herradura Express at the station, 2020.

General information
- Location: Guadalajara, Jalisco; Mexico
- Owner: Grupo Mexico
- Line: Line T
- Platforms: 1
- Tracks: 1

Services
Preceding station	Ferromex	Following station
Tequila Terminus	Tequila Express	Terminus
Amatitán Terminus	Tequila Herradura Express	Terminus
Former services
Preceding station	N de M	Following station
La Junta toward Buenavista	El Tapatío	Terminus
Preceding station	Ferrocarril del Pacífico	Following station
Tepic toward Nogales	El Costeño	Terminus
Nogales toward Mexicali	El Mexicali Joint operation with SBC	Terminus
Etzatlán Terminus	Guadalajara-Etzatlán	Terminus
Ameca Terminus	Guadalajara-Ameca	Terminus
Location

Guadalajara is a train station located in Guadalajara, Jalisco, Mexico. From the station, one can board trains to Tequila.

== History ==
=== Beginnings ===
During the creation of the railway network in Mexico, it was necessary for it to reach Guadalajara as it was an important destination in commerce, transportation and communication. The station projects were made, and after one was chosen, the governor of Jalisco, Ramón Corona, set his eyes on the land located behind the destroyed monastery of San Francisco.

This area, which extended to the Agua Azul park, was occupied by the schoolchildren's garden, several corrals, plots and some very humble houses. The station was built after demolishing the remaining walls of a former convent. The station was inaugurated on May 15, 1888, the day the first railroad arrived in the city, connecting it to Mexico City.

=== Renovation ===
In 1957, the rehabilitation of the Guadalajara-Irapuato railway line was carried out. Immediately afterwards the construction of the current station began. By December 1958, the civil works, including the patios and the roads, were 90 percent finished. The decision to build this new terminal was made by the Ferrocarriles Nacionales de México and the state governor, Agustín Yáñez. In front of the station there is a monument of a steam locomotive that in the past traveled from Guadalajara to Chapala. This steam locomotive weighs 15 tons and was placed on a quarry foundation in 1960.

In the waiting room there were 38 wooden benches and around this room, there were several stalls offering the sale of clothing, bags, food, books, Instant Lottery tickets, and other things. They also changed the floor from a granite floor to a very light brown glass floor. The pilasters that were previously covered in mosaics were covered in cement, giving the station a rustic view. The renovated station was inaugurated in 1960 by President Adolfo López Mateos.

Trains left from the station to different destinations in the country. The most important routes were the Ferrocarril del Pacífico to Nogales, and the Tapatío to Buenavista station in Mexico City. This last service departed at 8:00 am from Mexico City and arrived in Guadalajara at 8:00 pm.

=== Present ===
In August 1997, the creation of the Tequila Express was proposed. It consists of tourist rail tours that depart from Guadalajara and go to the town of Tequila, in order to promote the agave landscape and the haciendas where tequila, a characteristic drink of Jalisco, is produced.

Thus, the chamber of commerce and different businessmen joined together to make the project a reality, which was completed during the administration of Alberto Cárdenas Jiménez as governor of the state.

After the success of this train, Tequila Herradura and Ferromex would create the Tequila Herradura Express, a tourist train from Guadalajara to Amatitán, Jalisco. This line began operations on April 29, 2017.

== Connections ==
The station is connected to Line 1 of the Sistema de Tren Eléctrico Urbano at Washington station, and to the Mi Macro Calzada bus rapid transit line at Agua Azul station. The latter is only a few meters away from the railway station.

== See also ==
- Ferrocarriles Nacionales de México
- Rail transport in Mexico
