= Line T (Ferromex) =

Railway line in Mexico

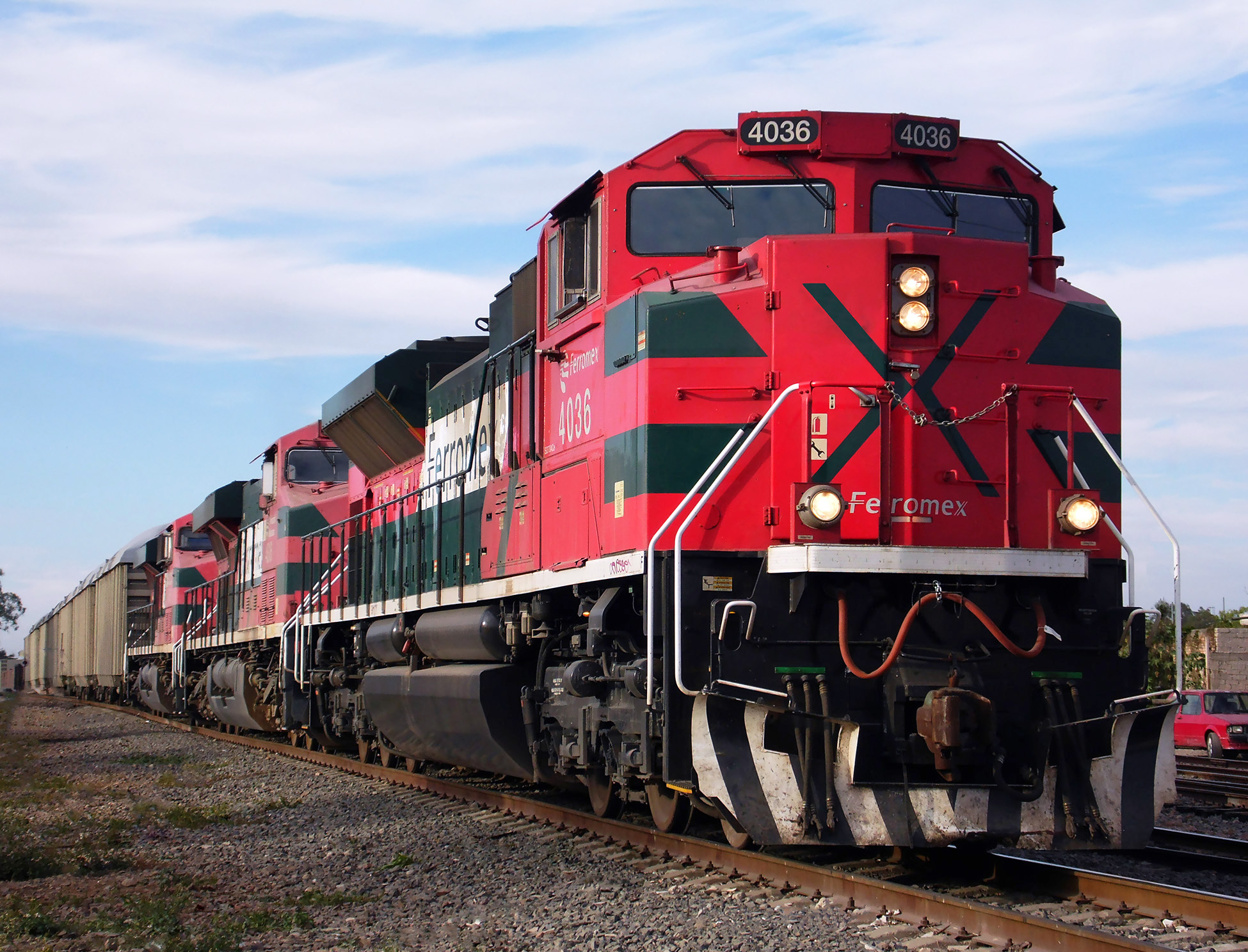
- Ferromex SD70ACe No. 4036 in Tepic, Nayarit

Overview
- Other name: Pacific North Railroad
- Native name: Línea T
- Owner: Federal government of Mexico
- Locale: Northwestern Mexico
- Termini: Nogales; Guadalajara
- Stations: 3 (active)

Service
- Type: Freight rail; Tourist train
- Operator: Ferromex

History
- Work began: 1879; 147 years ago
- Opened: 25 October 1882; 144 years ago
- Completed: 15 April 1927; 99 years ago

Technical
- Line length: 1,095 mi (1,762 km)
- Num of tracks: 1
- Track gauge: 1,435 mm (4 ft 8 1/2 in) standard gauge

The Line T (Spanish: Línea T), also known as Pacific North Railroad (Spanish: Ferrocarril Pacifico-Norte), is a 1,095-mile (1,762 km) railway line between Guadalajara and Nogales, Sonora. At its northern terminus in Nogales, the line directly intercharges with the Union Pacific Railroad's Nogales Subdivision at the Mexico–United States border. At its southern terminus in Guadalajara, it intercharges with Line I, which continues to Irapuato and Mexico City. The line is owned by the Federal government of Mexico and it is operated by Ferromex.

== History ==
The line was constructed by Atchison, Topeka and Santa Fe Railway as they organized the Sonora Railway in 1879. On September 14, 1880, Sonora Railway received a 99-year concession to build and operate from Guaymas to the United States border. The construction of the Nogales–Guaymas section was completed on October 25, 1882, and its opening ceremony was held at the border in Nogales. In 1898, the Santa Fe leased the Sonora Railway to the Southern Pacific Railroad until December 1911, when the Southern Pacific Railroad purchased the Sonora Railway and became part of the Southern Pacific Railroad of Mexico (Spanish: Ferrocarril Sud Pacifico de Mexico). The line was known as the West Coast Route (Spanish: Ruta de la Costa Occidental).

On April 15, 1927, the Southern Pacific Railroad of Mexico completed the extension to Guadalajara. Regular service began on April 16, operating from Nogales to Guadalajara, where a connection with the Ferrocarriles Nacionales de México (N de M) provided service to Buenavista station in Mexico City. In 1951, the line was sold to the Mexican government and became part of the Ferrocarril del Pacífico, which later merged into Ferrocarriles Nacionales de México in 1987.

As President Ernesto Zedillo privatized the Ferrocarriles Nacionales de México in 1995, Grupo Ferroviario Mexicano, a consortium composed of Grupo México (74%) and Union Pacific Railroad (26%), was awarded the concession of the line with a bid of 3.1527 million pesos in July 1997. The line subsequently became part of Ferromex.

== Passenger services ==
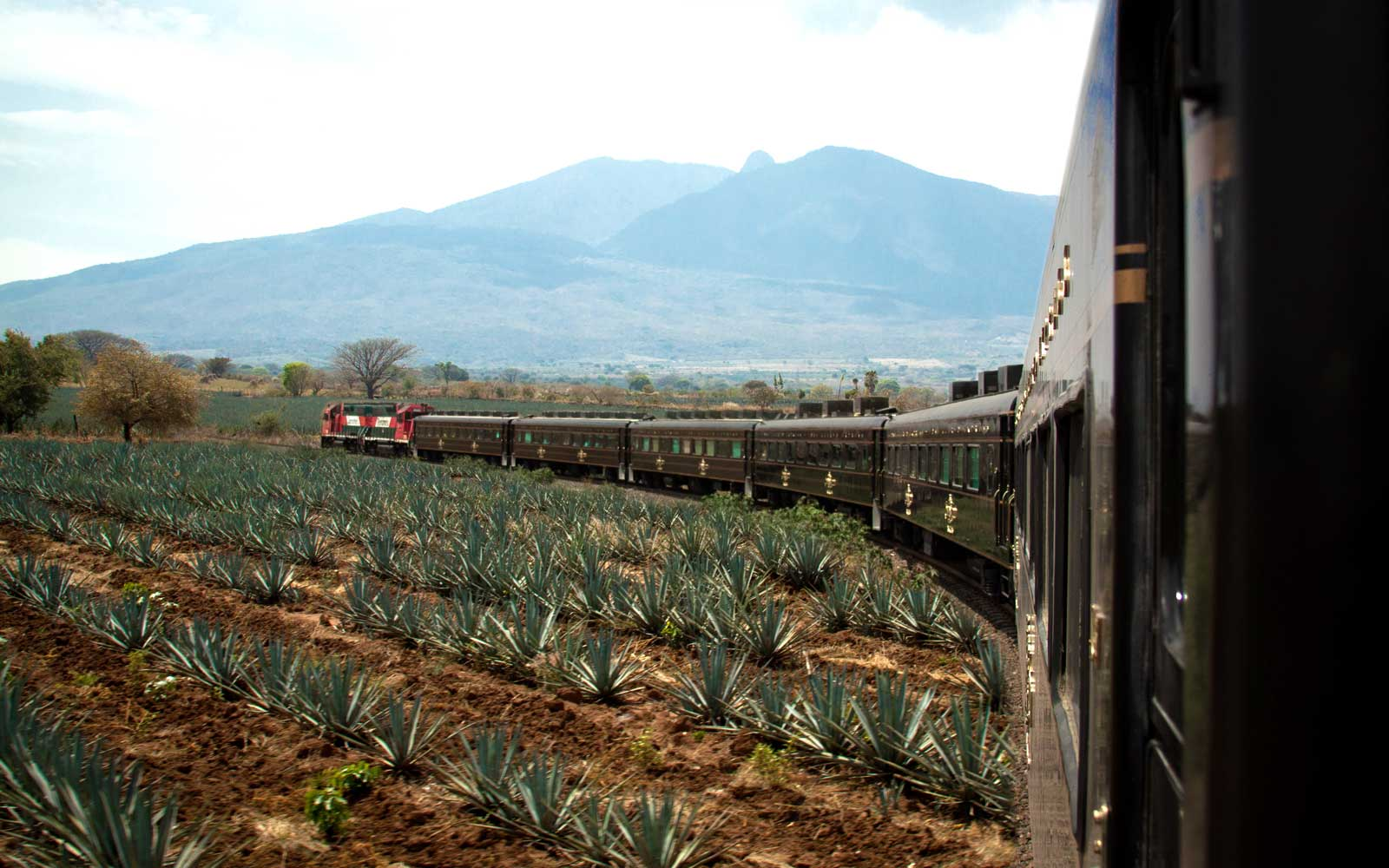
Tequila Express at the Blue Agave (Agave tequilana) in Jalisco

Although intercity passenger trains was discontinued in 1997, a few passenger trains still operate on the line in Jalisco section, which is currently used primarily by tourist trains:

- Cámara de Comercio de Guadalajara
  - Tequila Express (Guadalajara–Tequila)
  - Tequila Herradura Express (Guadalajara–Amatitán)

== See also ==
- Line A (Ferromex)
- Line B (Kansas City Southern de México)
- Ferrocarril Sonora–Baja California
- Ferrocarril Nacional de la Baja California
- Ferrocarril Chihuahua al Pacífico
- Rail transport in Mexico
