= Ferrocarril Mexicano =

Ferrocarril Mexicano may refer to:

- Ferrocarril Mexicano (1998), commonly known as Ferromex, a private rail consortium, one of the two largest (Ferrosur)
- Ferrocarril Mexicano (1867–1959), officially known as Mexican Railway, owner of a line between Mexico City and Veracruz
