= Tapatío (train) =

El Tapatío
Overview
- Locale: Mexico
- First service: 1888
- Last service: 1998
- Former operator: Ferrocarriles Nacionales de México

Route
- Termini: Buenavista station, Mexico City; Guadalajara station, Guadalajara

Technical
- Track gauge: Standard gauge

The Tapatío (named for the Spanish word tapatío, meaning a person from Jalisco) was a passenger service between Mexico City and Guadalajara. It was operated by the Ferrocarriles Nacionales de México (N de M), providing an express service between its two destinations.

== History ==
Under the N de M, the train in its normal service had more than 90 stations throughout its route, including its main stations at Mexico City's Buenavista station, Irapuato, and Guadalajara.

The branch of Line A of the national railway network, which was opened in 1888, reached Guadalajara for its importance as a means of passenger transportation. Eventually, this branch, known as the Irapuato-Guadalajara line, gave rise to the new Line T in 1943, which connected Guadalajara to Nogales. In 1957, the Irapuato-Guadalajara line also led to the expansion of Line I to the Pacific coast in the state of Colima, to help the transport of maritime cargo from Manzanillo to Mexico City, via Guadalajara.

By 1960, the Tapatío was one of the last four fully Pullman trains in North America. Soon afterwards, he old, heavy Pullman bed cars, painted in light turquoise with a red stripe, were replaced by newer cars that the N de M purchased second-hand from railroad companies in the United States.

From its opening in 1888 until its closure in 1998, the Tapatío supplemented the service of the long-distance train known as the Regiomontano, whose route was twice that of the Tapatío although its speed was also higher; both had stops in stations of the important cities. Like the local Regiomontano, the Tapatío was aimed at middle- and upper-class users, who traveled in Pullman sleeping cars.

=== Proposed revival ===
On 20 November 2023, the government of Andrés Manuel López Obrador issued a decree to reactivate seven passenger train lines, including the Mexico City-Guadalajara route.

In July 2024, president-elect Claudia Sheinbaum announced plans to restore the Mexico City-Guadalajara passenger train. The work on restoring this service will begin on 1 October 2024, and the new service will open on 17 May 2029.

The estimated time of the new Mexico City-Querétaro-Guadalajara Train route would be approximately three hours with 34 minutes, considering a maximum speed of 160 kilometers per hour in the 581 kilometers. The intention is also to connect the Guadalajara train with Nogales across the Pacific coast.

== See also ==
- Tren México-Querétaro-Guadalajara, for further reading on the proposed revival of the Tapatío
- Rail transport in Mexico
- Ferrocarriles Nacionales de México
