= Tequila Volcano =

Stratovolcano in Tequila, Jalisco, Mexico

- Volcan de Tequila
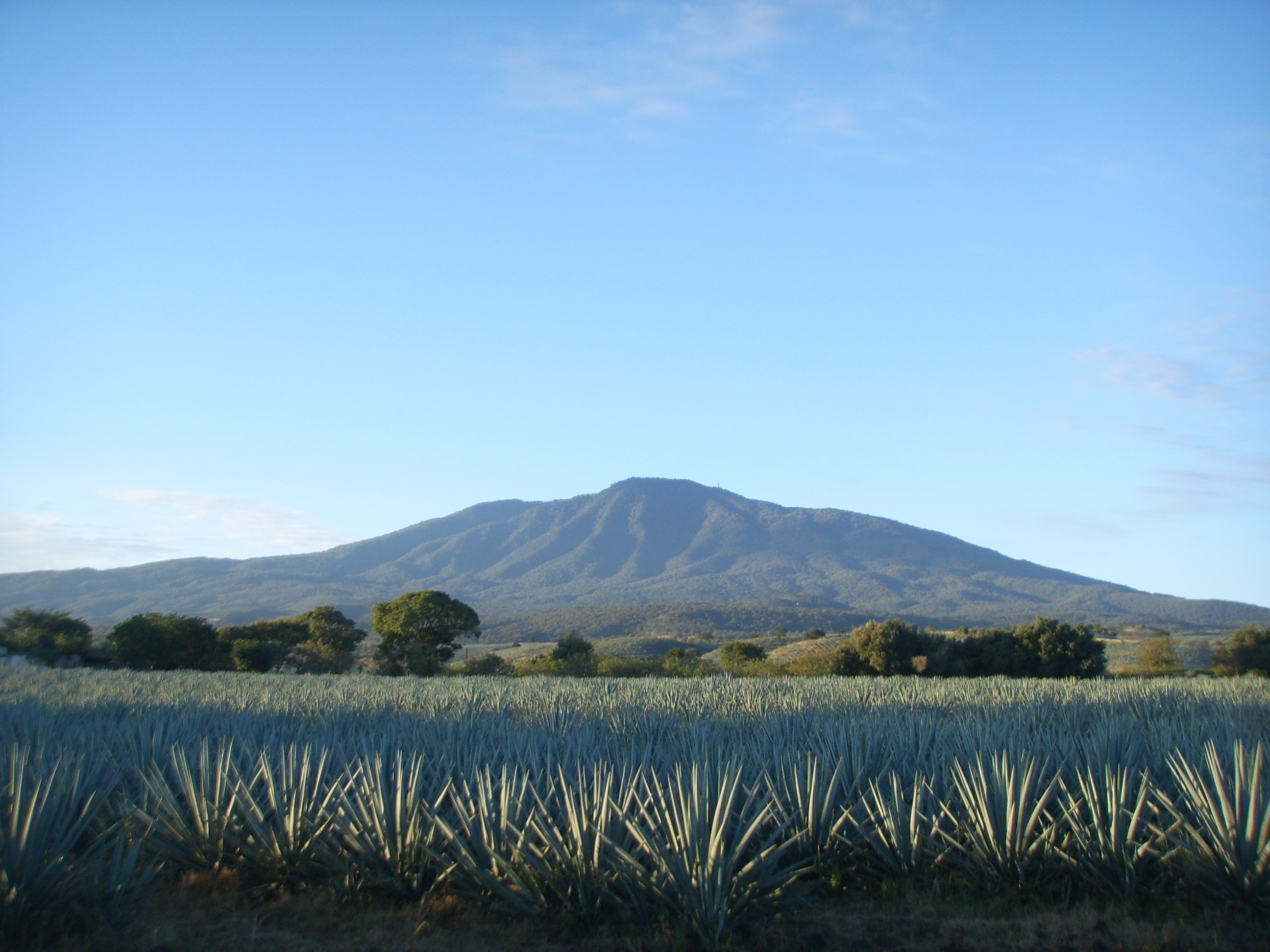

Highest point
- Elevation: 2,920 m (9,580 ft)
- Prominence: 1,520 m (4,990 ft)
- Listing: Ultra
- Coordinates: 20°47′15″N 103°50′48″W

Geography
- Location within Mexico Location within Jalisco
- Location: Jalisco, Mexico

Geology
- Mountain type: Stratovolcano
- Last eruption: ~200,000 years ago

Tequila Volcano, or Volcán de Tequila is a stratovolcano located near Tequila, Jalisco, in Mexico. It stands at a height of 2,920 meters (9,580 feet) above sea level.

== Tectonic setting ==
Tequila Volcano is located near the town of Tequila in the state of Jalisco, Mexico and it is the fourth highest of the state after Volcán Nevado de Colima, Volcán de Fuego and Cerro Viejo. The Tequila Volcano is part of a chain of volcanoes parallel with the Middle America Trench, is a 1,700 miles (2,700 km) oceanic trench in the eastern Pacific Ocean off the southwestern coast of Middle America, stretching from central Mexico and Costa Rica.

== Geological history ==
Compared to other types of volcanoes, the Tequila Volcano lived much longer and was more active since it is a stratovolcano. There is no particular date of when exactly the volcano itself was active, but we can tell whether it was active or not according to its volcanic field and structure. The Tequila Volcano’s volcanic field is 1600 km^3, showing that it was active at one point in the past. When the Tequila Volcano last erupted, there were no casualties.

== Tequila Volcano today ==
The volcano does not pose a threat to surrounding communities. Being inactive for around 220,000 years it is now covered in vegetation and is easy to access. Visitors can drive to the volcano's crater without any concerns for safety.

The volcano has contributed greatly towards an agave culture where Mexico relies on the rich soils that the volcano created to cultivate blue agave and create the beverage Tequila and Mescal. Tequila, Jalisco benefits greatly from the Tequila Volcano. When the volcano erupted, lava flowed where the town is located today and left enriched soils where blue agave can thrive. Blue agave is the main ingredient for Mexico’s National drink, tequila. Agave is the dominant agriculture in Tequila, Jalisco; "roughly one-fourth of all inhabitants of Tequila work in the fields and at least another 1,200 work distilling, bottling, packaging, or promoting tequila."

== See also ==
- List of Ultras of Mexico
- Mountain peaks of México
