= Buenavista railway station (1873) =

Former railway station in Mexico City, Mexico

Buenavista
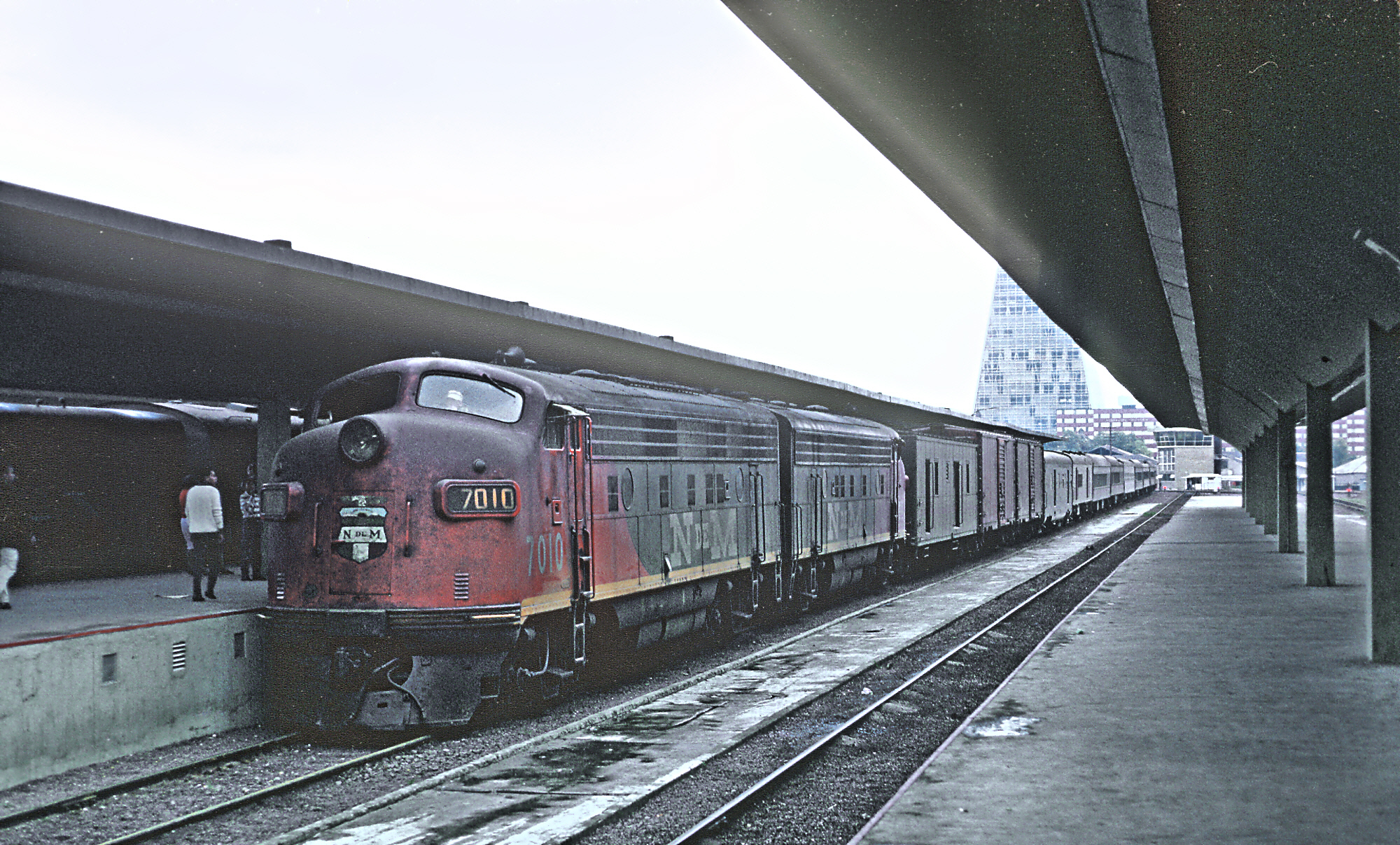
- An EMD FP9 at the platforms in 1966

General information
- Location: Cuauhtémoc, Mexico City
- Coordinates: 19.4478°N 99.1522°W
- Owner: N de M (1909-2001)
- Line: Various destinations
- Platforms: 5 island and 2 side platforms
- Tracks: 10

Construction
- Structure type: At-grade
- Platform levels: 1

History
- Opened: January 20, 1873
- Closed: 1958, 2005
- Rebuilt: 1961

Former services
Preceding station	N de M	Following station
Terminus	Águila Azteca	Huichapan toward Nuevo Laredo
Terminus	El Jarocho	Valle de México toward Veracruz
Terminus	El Regiomontano	San Luis Potosí toward Monterrey
Terminus	El Tapatío	Lechería toward Guadalajara
Terminus	Mexico City–Querétaro electric passenger train 1994-1996	Cuautitlán toward Querétaro
Location
- Old location in Mexico City

Buenavista Station (Spanish: Estación Buenavista), also called Buenavista Terminal (Spanish: Terminal Buenavista), was a passenger train station in Mexico City. The station opened in 1873 and was fully operated by Ferrocarriles Nacionales de México from 1909 until its demolition in 1958. The original station was replaced by a modern structure, which remained in operation until 2005. In 2008, the site was redeveloped to become the terminus of the Tren Suburbano commuter rail service.

== History ==
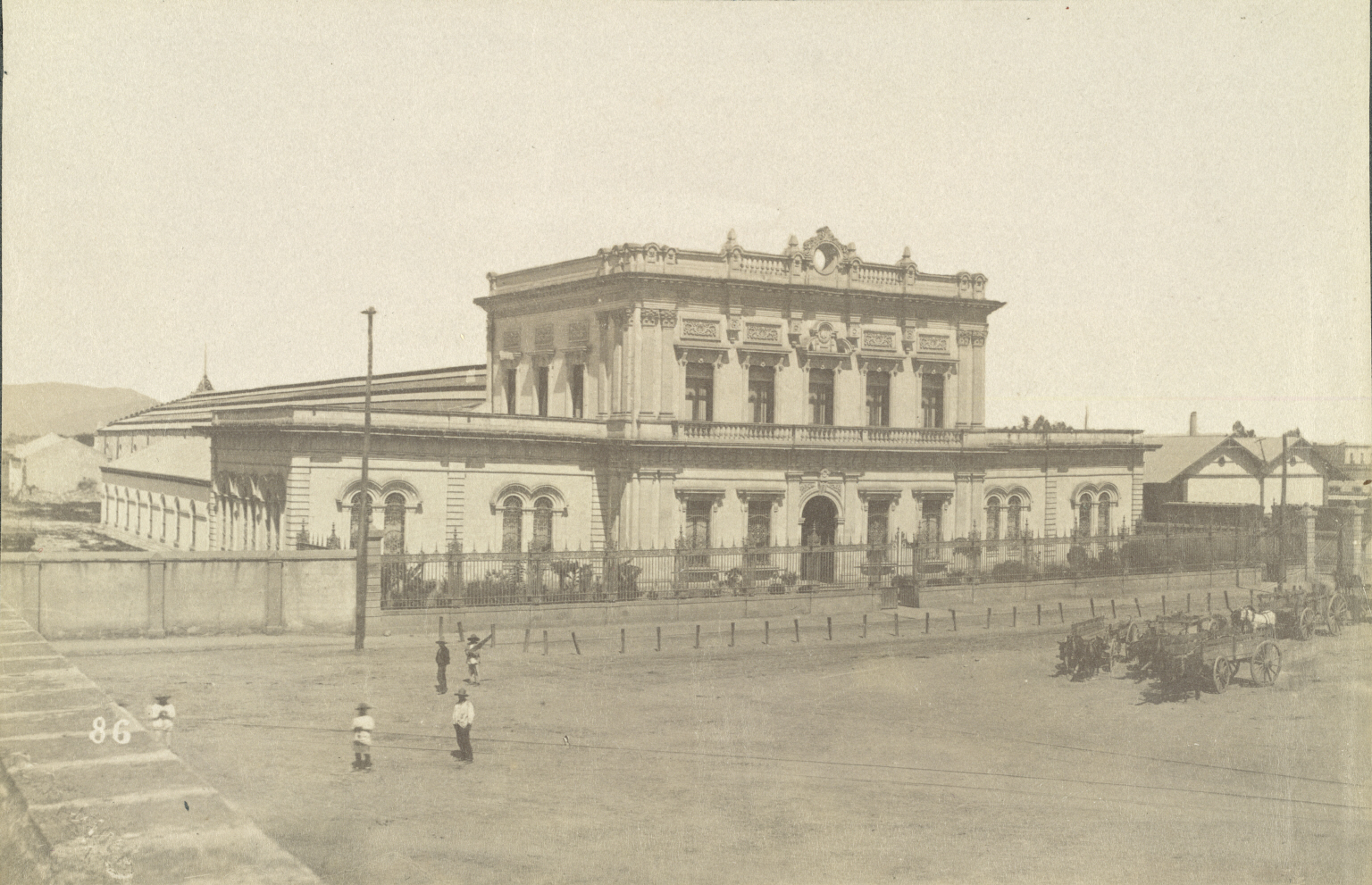
The train station c. 1885

The station served to inaugurate passenger rail service in Mexico on January 20, 1873, when Ferrocarriles Nacionales de México ran its first passenger rail trip from Mexico City to the Port of Veracruz. Among the passengers of the inaugural trip was Sebastián Lerdo de Tejada, President of Mexico at the time. The rail trip took three days due to a number of official presidential events along the route.

The original structure was demolished by Ferrocarriles Nacionales de México in 1958 to construct a new station nearby. The plot on which the original station stood was redeveloped. The new Buenavista Station was inaugurated in 1961 by President Adolfo López Mateos.

The headquarters of Ferrocarriles Nacionales de México were built in front of the station and to the north of the station, an automated postal facility was constructed. To the south of the station, the borough hall of the Borough of Cuauhtémoc was inaugurated in September 1976. The traffic circle in front of the station holds a statue of Christopher Columbus, which was inaugurated on October 12, 1892, in celebration of the 400-year anniversary of the explorer's discovery of America.

The principal intercity destinations served by Buenavista station were:

- Cuernavaca, Morelos
- Guadalajara, Jalisco
- Querétaro, Querétaro
- Veracruz, Veracruz
- Monterrey, Nuevo León
- Mérida, Yucatán
- Ciudad Juárez, Chihuahua
- Nuevo Laredo, Tamaulipas
- Durango, Durango
- Aguascalientes, Aguascalientes
- San Luis Potosí, San Luis Potosí
- Oaxaca, Oaxaca
- Morelia, Michoacán

Ferrocarriles Nacionales de México used the train terminal for passenger train traffic to connect the United States, Guatemala, and Belize with other Mexican cities.

== See also ==
- Rail transport in Mexico
- List of Mexican railroads
