= Regiomontano (train) =

El Regiomontano
Overview
- Locale: Mexico
- First service: 1882
- Last service: 1997
- Successor: Proposed revival (2029)
- Former operator: Ferrocarriles Nacionales de México

Route
- Termini: Buenavista station, Mexico City; Monterrey
- Stops: 4

Technical
- Track gauge: Standard gauge

The Regiomontano (from the Spanish demonym for a person from Monterrey) was a passenger train that provided service between Mexico City and Monterrey, formerly operated by Ferrocarriles Nacionales de México.

It was considered a luxury train, due to the small niche of users, mainly from the middle or upper class. Therefore, it did not provide a mass transport service. Its journey was fifteen hours, and its intermediate stops were mainly San Luis Potosí and Saltillo.

The train had 4 stations on its route: Mexico City's Buenavista station, San Luis Potosí, Saltillo, and Monterrey.

== History ==
Line B of the national railway network, which runs from Mexico City to Nuevo Laredo, was built during the Porfiriato through foreign capital investment. On 31 August 1882, it reached Monterrey, which, together with the steel and brewing industries, triggered the development of the third most important metropolitan area in Mexico.

Because its route was geographically less rugged than other routes from the country's capital, it was supposed to be one of the two fast trains of the Mexican railway system, along with the Águila Azteca, that transported passengers from Mexico City to Monterrey, being able to cover that route in a time of between twelve and fourteen hours, not making any stopovers.

During the 1970s, railroads built on wooden sleepers were better off than asphalt or dirt roads; and passenger transport was cheaper than the more modern civil aviation. Initially, the city of San Luis Potosí was the only stopover between Monterrey and Mexico City; but in time it was possible for the train to stop at Huehuetoca.

Following the decentralization of the national rail transport service in 1996 and the dissolution of Ferrocarriles Nacionales de México in 2001, privately owned railroads have used Line B for freight transport only. From the end of the N de M until the opening of Tren Maya and Tren Interoceánico in 2023, the only remaining inter-city passenger trains in Mexico were tourist trains, such as the Tequila Express and the Ferrocarril Chihuahua al Pacífico.

=== Proposed revival ===
On 20 November 2023, the government of Andrés Manuel López Obrador announced a decree to reactivate seven passenger train routes, including the Mexico City-San Luis Potosí-Monterrey-Nuevo Laredo route. By February 2024, Canadian Pacific Kansas City, the current operator of the Mexico City-Nuevo Laredo Line, had expressed interest in hosting the service.

The following July, president-elect Claudia Sheinbaum announced that this line will be the first passenger train route to be built during her administration, and that it will be built by military engineers of the Secretariat of National Defense. The revived Mexico City-Nuevo Laredo train, will be an electric train traveling at a top speed of 160 kilometres per hour (99 mph), and it will have intermediate stops at Querétaro, San Luis Potosí and Monterrey. This train is currently scheduled to open in December 2029.

== Amenities ==
The Regiomontano was a luxury train which carried a dining car that offered a first class service, a menu of exquisite table wines, and dishes for dinner and lunch. It also had a bar car in which drinks and snacks were served. The sleeping cars had dressing rooms and bedrooms with private bathrooms and comfortable armchairs that, at night, became beds.

== See also ==
- Águila Azteca
- Rail transport in Mexico
- Ferrocarriles Nacionales de México
