= Amatitán =

- Municipality and town
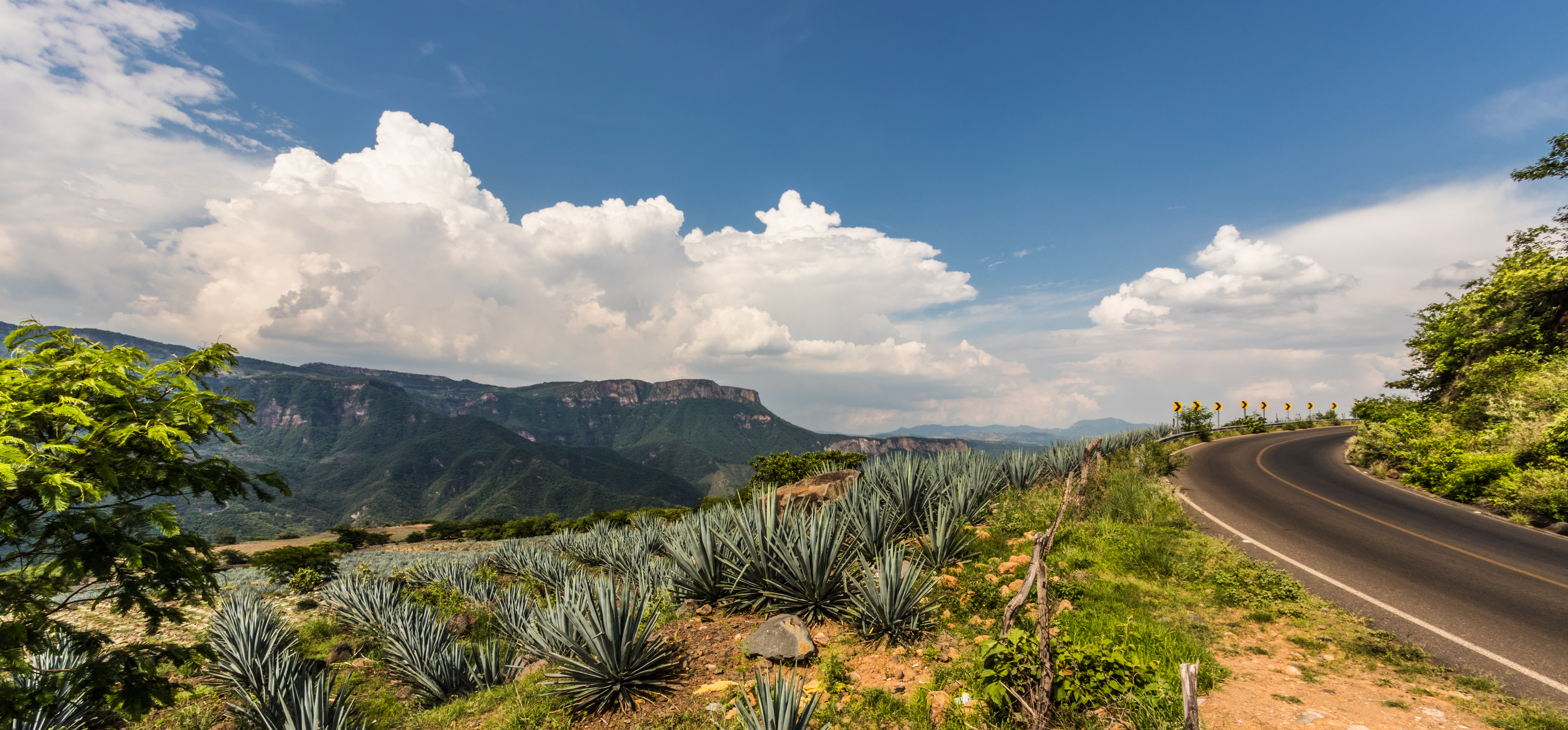

- Coat of arms

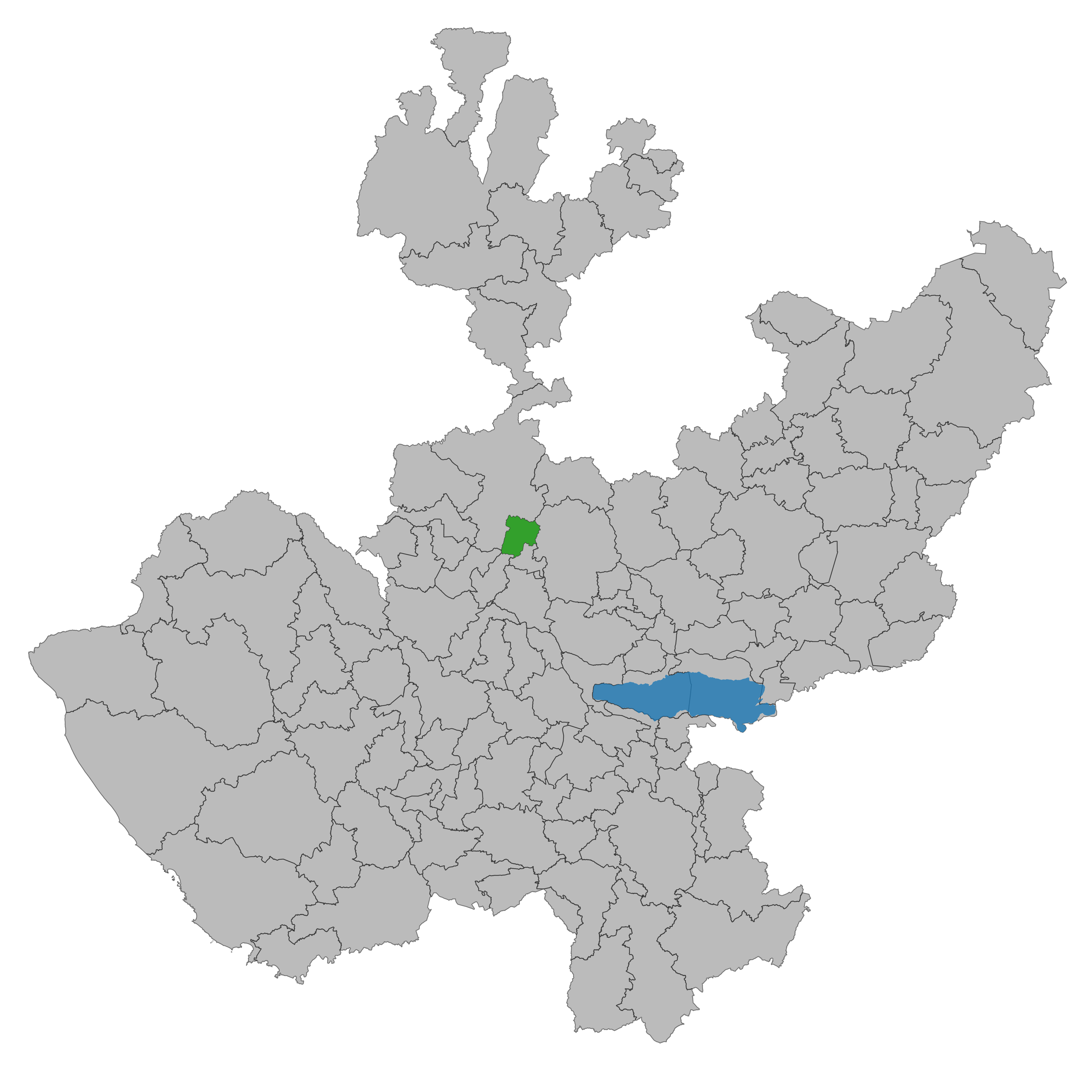
- Municipality of Amatitán in Jalisco

- Location in Mexico Amatitán (Mexico)
- Country: Mexico
- State: Jalisco
- Municipal seat: Amatitán

Area
  - Total: 172.6 km^{2} (66.6 sq mi)
  - Town: 2.83 km^{2} (1.09 sq mi)

Population (2020 census)
  - Total: 16,490
  - Density: 95.54/km^{2} (247.4/sq mi)
  - Town: 12,180
  - Town density: 4,300/km^{2} (11,100/sq mi)
- Time zone: UTC-6 (Central (US Central))
- postal code: 45380
- Area code: 374

Amatitán is the seat of a municipality in the Mexican state of Jalisco, and is home to one of the world's largest tequila distilleries.

It is the location of "La Hacienda de San José del Refugio", a distillery which makes "Tequila Herradura" and "Tequila Jimador" and is the main source of employment for the residents of the town and surrounding communities.

The Town of Amatitán is the administrative center for the "Municipio de Amatitán" which also includes the surrounding communities of Santiaguito, Villa de Cuerámbaro, Chome, La Mata, La Conchilla, El Amarrilo, Agua Fría, Santa Rosa and several other smaller settlements.

Amatitán can be visited from Guadalajara by taking the Tequila Herradura Express, a train which runs on Saturdays from Guadalajara to Amatitán, there tourists are offered tours of the local distilleries and the nearby city of Tequila, located 14 kilometres (8.7 mi) north of Amatitán. Amatitán can also be reached from Guadalajara by car driving north on Mexican Federal Highway 15, it is a drive of about 45 minutes and the road is kept in fairly good shape.

The economy of the municipality of Amatitán, like that of the surrounding areas, relies heavily in the production of tequila beverage. Its agriculture is dominated by the cultivation of the agave plant, which is used to produce the tequila. The climate in Amatitán is hot and dry which suits the agave plant well. There is usually one rainy period during the year that lasts from June through September, when most of the residents grow their other dominant crop, corn, which requires significantly more water. There is virtually no artificial irrigation in the area and most farmers still depend on rainwater for the irrigation of their fields. Some residents also raise cattle and other livestock, mainly for regional consumption. The lifestyle of its inhabitants is mostly of a rural nature and the residents are mostly Catholic. Some commute daily or weekly to Guadalajara for employment. The area is also a source of immigrants to the United States, most of whom settle in California.

== Government ==
=== Municipal presidents ===
Municipal president	Term	Political party	Notes
Juan Cardona	1910–1911		
Maximiano Hernández	1912–1913		
Florentino Orozco	1914		
Fermín Hernández	1915–1916		
Ismael Cruz	1917		
Jesús Martínez	1918		
Fermín Hernández	1919		
Refugio Mendoza	1919		
Domingo Ontiveros	1920		
Ismael Cruz	1920		
Juan Cardona	1921		
Salvador Ontiveros	1921		
Bartolo Cortez	1922–1923		
Mauricio Meléndrez	1924–1929		
Juan Cardona	1930	PNR	
Bartolo Cortez	1931	PNR	
Emilio Hernández	1932	PNR	
Juan Cardona	1933–1934	PNR	
Mauricio Meléndrez	1935	PNR	
Nicasio C. Rosales	1936	PNR	
Alberto Meléndrez	1937	PNR	
Silverio Franco	1938	PRM	
Pascual Villegas	1939	PRM	
Nicasio C. Rosales	1940	PRM	
Vicente Real	1941–1942	PRM	
Rosendo Ramos	1943–1944	PRM	
Ignacio Flores	1945–1946	PRM	
Emilio Hernández Curiel	1947–1948	PRI	
Sebastián Rivera	1949–1951	PRI	
Bartolo Cortez	1952	PRI	
Florentino Orozco Camarena	1953	PRI	Acting municipal president
José Rivera Ocampo	1954	PRI	
Florentino Orozco C.	1955	PRI	
Emilio Hernández O.	1956–1957	PRI	
Martín Ortega Calderón	1958	PRI	Acting municipal president
L. Ramiro Cortez M.	01-01-1959–31-12-1961	PRI	
Salvador Rivera Lizardi	01-01-1962–31-12-1964	PRI	
Alfredo Rivera Lizardi	01-01-1965–31-12-1967	PRI	
L. Ramiro Cortez Martínez	01-01-1968–31-12-1970	PRI	
Salvador Rivera Lizardi	01-01-1971–31-12-1973	PRI	
Manuel Delgado Hernández	01-01-1974–31-12-1976	PRI	
Ma. Guadalupe Guapo Rivera	01-01-1977–31-12-1979	PRI	
David Calderón Zepeda	01-01-1980–31-12-1982	PRI	
Rosendo Ramos Ontiveros	01-01-1983–31-12-1985	PRI	
Manuel Delgado Hernández	01-01-1986–31-12-1988	PRI	
Salvador Rivera Cardona	01-01-1989–1992	PRI	
Zenón Vargas Gutiérrez	1992–1995	PRI	
Benjamín Aldana González	1995–1997	PRI	
Raúl Andrés Ontiveros Bahnsen	01-01-1998–31-12-2000	PRI	
Benjamín Aldana González	01-01-2001–31-12-2003	PRI	
Joel Rodríguez Saldívar	01-01-2004–31-12-2006	PAN	
Rubén Núñez Yera	01-01-2007–31-12-2009	PRI	
Eutimio Pérez Ocampo	01-01-2010–30-09-2012	PRI; Panal	Coalition "Alliance for Jalisco"
Jaime Villalobos Rivera	01-10-2012–30-09-2015	PRI; PVEM	Coalition "Compromise for Jalisco"
David Calderón González	01-10-2015–30-09-2018	PAN; PRD	
Gildardo Partida Meléndrez	01-10-2018–30-09-2021	Panal	
Josué Saúl Pérez Ocampo	01-10-2021–	Morena	
