= Tequila, Jalisco =

Tequila
- Town & Municipality
- Santiago de Tequila
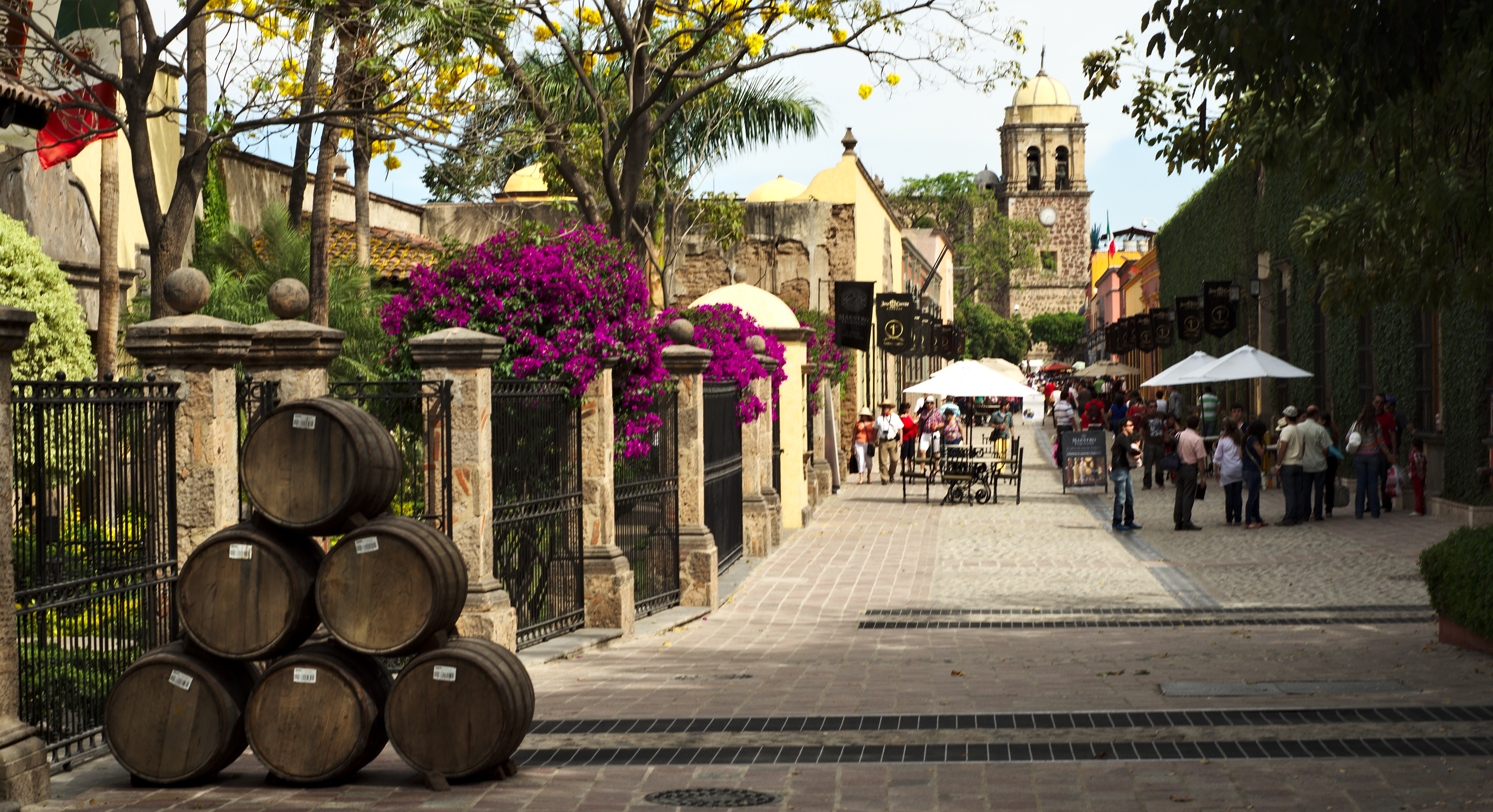
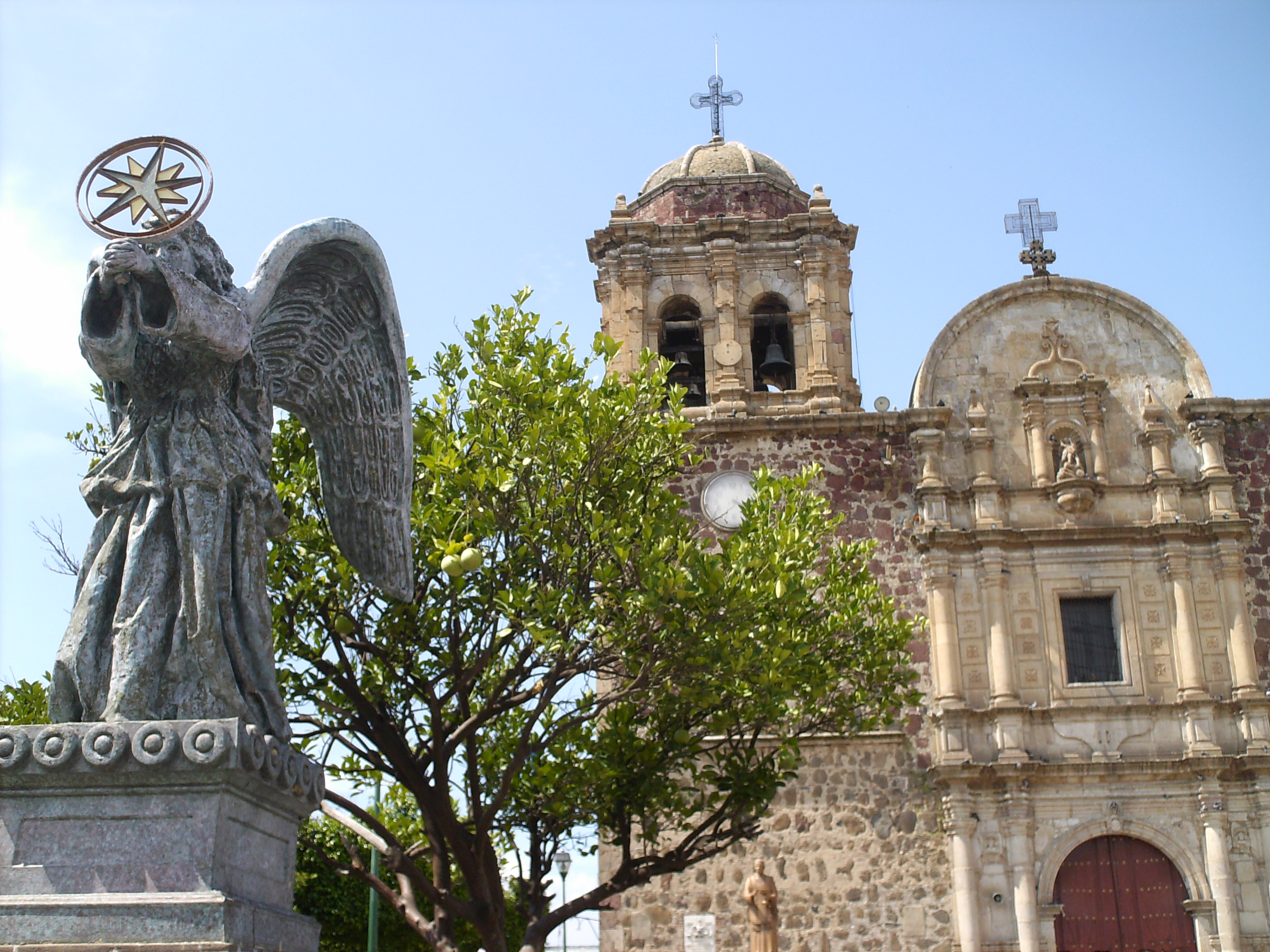
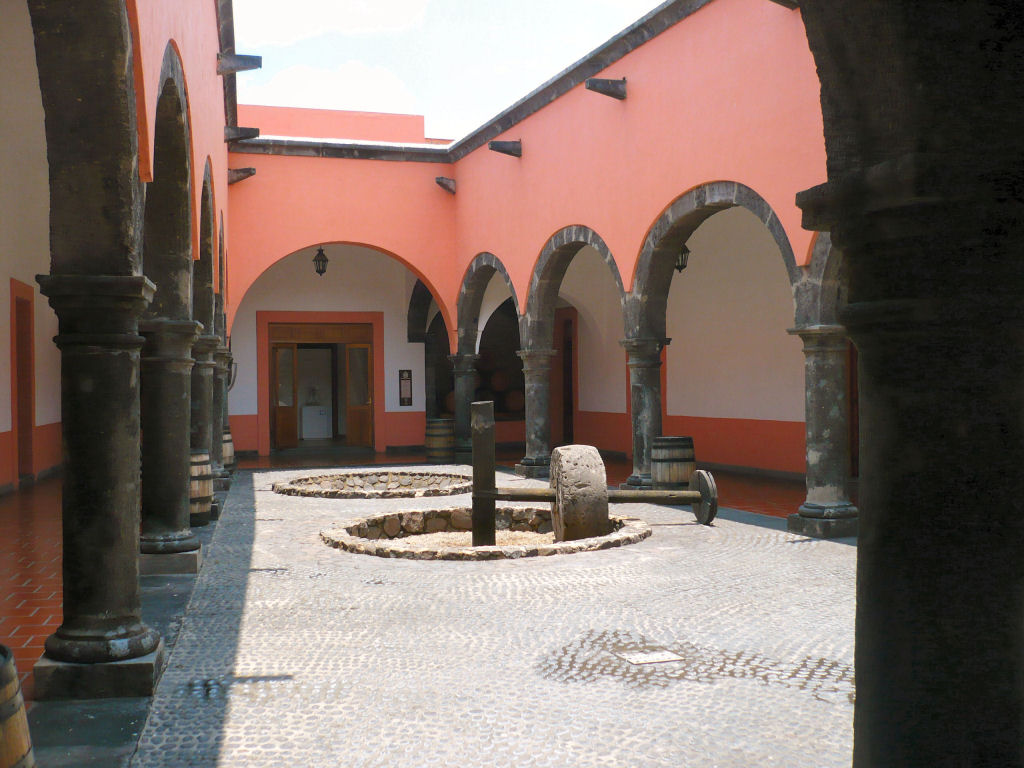
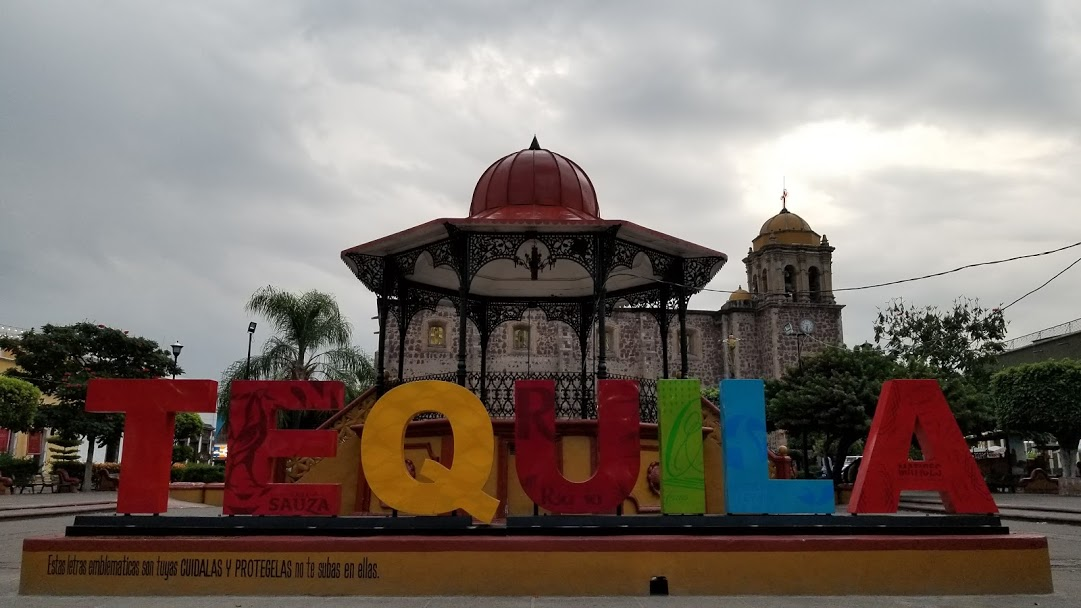

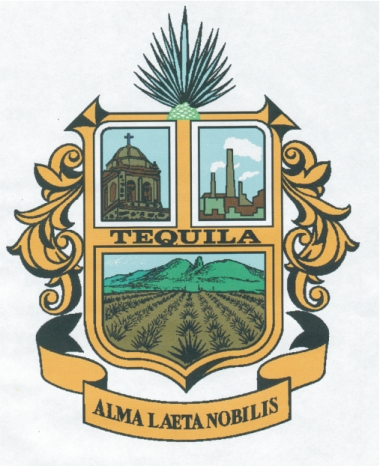
- Coat of arms

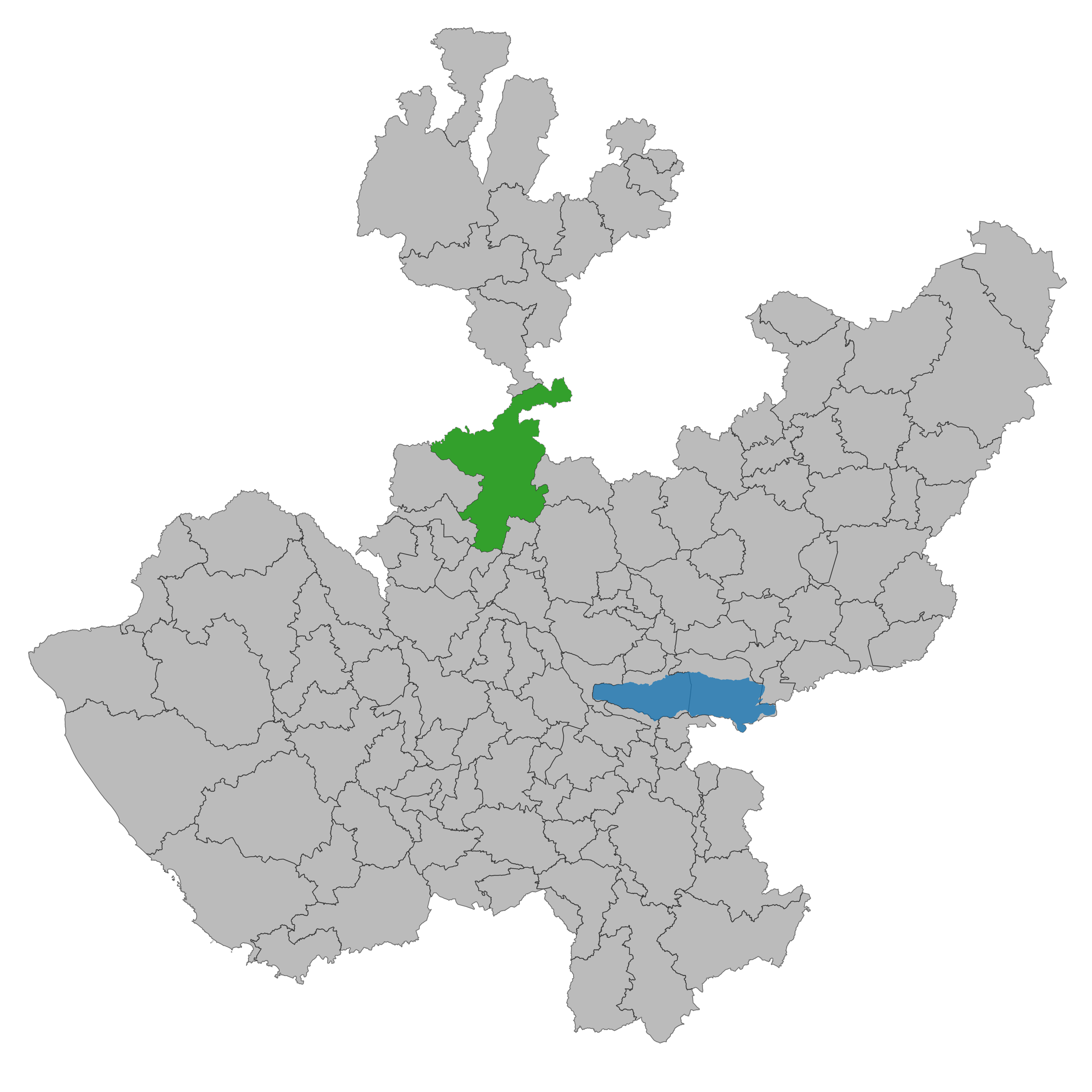
- Location of the municipality in Jalisco

- Location in Mexico
- Coordinates: 20°52′58″N 103°50′12″W
- Country: Mexico
- State: Jalisco
- Founded: 1530
- Municipal Status: 1850

Government
  - Mayor: Lorena Marisol Rodríguez

Area
  - Municipality: 1,693 km^{2} (654 sq mi)
  - Seat: 6.62 km^{2} (2.56 sq mi)
- Elevation (of seat): 1,180 m (3,870 ft)

Population (2020 census)
  - Municipality: 44,353
  - Density: 26.20/km^{2} (67.85/sq mi)
  - Seat: 31,115
  - Seat density: 4,700/km^{2} (12,200/sq mi)
- Time zone: UTC-6 (Central (US Central))
- Postal code (of seat): 46400
- Demonym: Tequilense
- Website: (in Spanish) Official site

Santiago de Tequila (Spanish: [teˈkila]; Nahuatl languages: Tequillan, Tecuila "place of tribute") is a Mexican town and municipality located in the state of Jalisco about 60 km from the city of Guadalajara. Tequila is best known as being the birthplace of the drink that bears its name, "tequila," which is made from the blue agave plant, native to this area. The heart of the plant contains natural sugars and was traditionally used to make a fermented drink. After the Spanish arrived, they took this fermented beverage and distilled it, producing the tequila known today. The popularity of the drink and the history behind it has made the town and the area surrounding it a World Heritage Site. It was also named a "Pueblo Mágico" (Magical Town) in 2003 by the Mexican federal government.

The coat of arms of the municipality was officially adopted on 31 December 1983 by the municipal council. It contains the Latin phrase ALMA LAETA NOBILIS, meaning "cheerful and noble soul". Its representative symbols include the tower of the main church in the town of Tequila, the chimneys of the distilleries, the agave plant and Tequila Mountain.

== History ==
The first peoples to live in this area were probably the people from the shaft tomb culture during the Middle Formative Period. By the Late Formative and Classic period, the Teuchitlan tradition entered the region. Several guachimonton complexes were built nearby such as Huitzilapa to the west and Amatitan to the east. The Epiclassic saw an intrusion of peoples from the Bajio region during a period of intense drought bringing with them many Central Mexican characteristics. By the Postclassic a variety of ethnic identities were in the region such as Caxcan, Cora, and Huichol. The major pre-Hispanic settlement was not where the town of Tequila is today, but rather in a place called Teochtinchán. After the Spanish Conquest of the Aztec Empire, the Spanish moved west and this region became part of what was known as Nueva Galicia during the colonial period. Initial resistance to Spanish domination was brief. Local people fortified their major town, but in the end decided to surrender peacefully.

The village of Santiago de Tequila was founded in 1530 by Franciscan friars, who moved many of the local people here from Chiquihuitillo Mountain (now known as Tequila Volcano). In 1541, indigenous people in various parts of Nueva Galicia revolted against Spanish rule. Locally, The Tecoxines and Caxcanes in the towns of Tlaltenango, Xochipila, Nochictlán and Teocaltech rebelled first, with those in Tequila joining later. These rebels made their stand on Tequila Mountain. Friar Juan Calero of the monastery near Tequila went to try and pacify the situation, but he was killed by a barrage of arrows and rocks. His body was stripped of its robes and hung on the local stone idol. Another monk who died trying to negotiate a settlement was Friar Antonio de Cuellar of the Etzatlan monastery. In October 1541, the situation in Nueva Galicia was so serious that the viceroy, Antonio de Mendoza, arrived from Mexico City. Rebel chief Diego Zacatecas went to meet with the viceroy, but was immediately taken prisoner by the Spanish. The price for his release was the end of the rebellion and for the chief to convert to Christianity.

In 1600, Pedro Sánchez de Tagle decided to build a large scale distilling operation based on a local fermented beverage made with the local agave plant. He also introduced the idea of cultivating this plant, native to the region, on a mass scale.

At the beginning of the 19th century came another rebellion in the Tequila area, this time led by a man only known as "The Gold Mask". This rebellion was suppressed by the governor of Nueva Galicia, José Fernando de Abascal y Sousa, for which he was subsequently promoted to viceroy of Peru.

Shortly after this came the Mexican War of Independence. Rafael Pérez, under orders from José María Mercado, came to Tequila with 200 men to take over the town from royalist forces. After Independence, the town to Tequila was made the seat of one of the departments of the new state of Jalisco. When these departments were reorganized into municipalities, the town of Tequila was made the seat of the municipality of the same name. In 1874, the town of Tequila was given the official status of city. This was in recognition of an event in 1873, when Sixto Gorjón, about 50 police and citizens of Tequila fought off a group of bandits headed by Manuel Lozada, known as "The Tiger of Alicia".

== The town ==
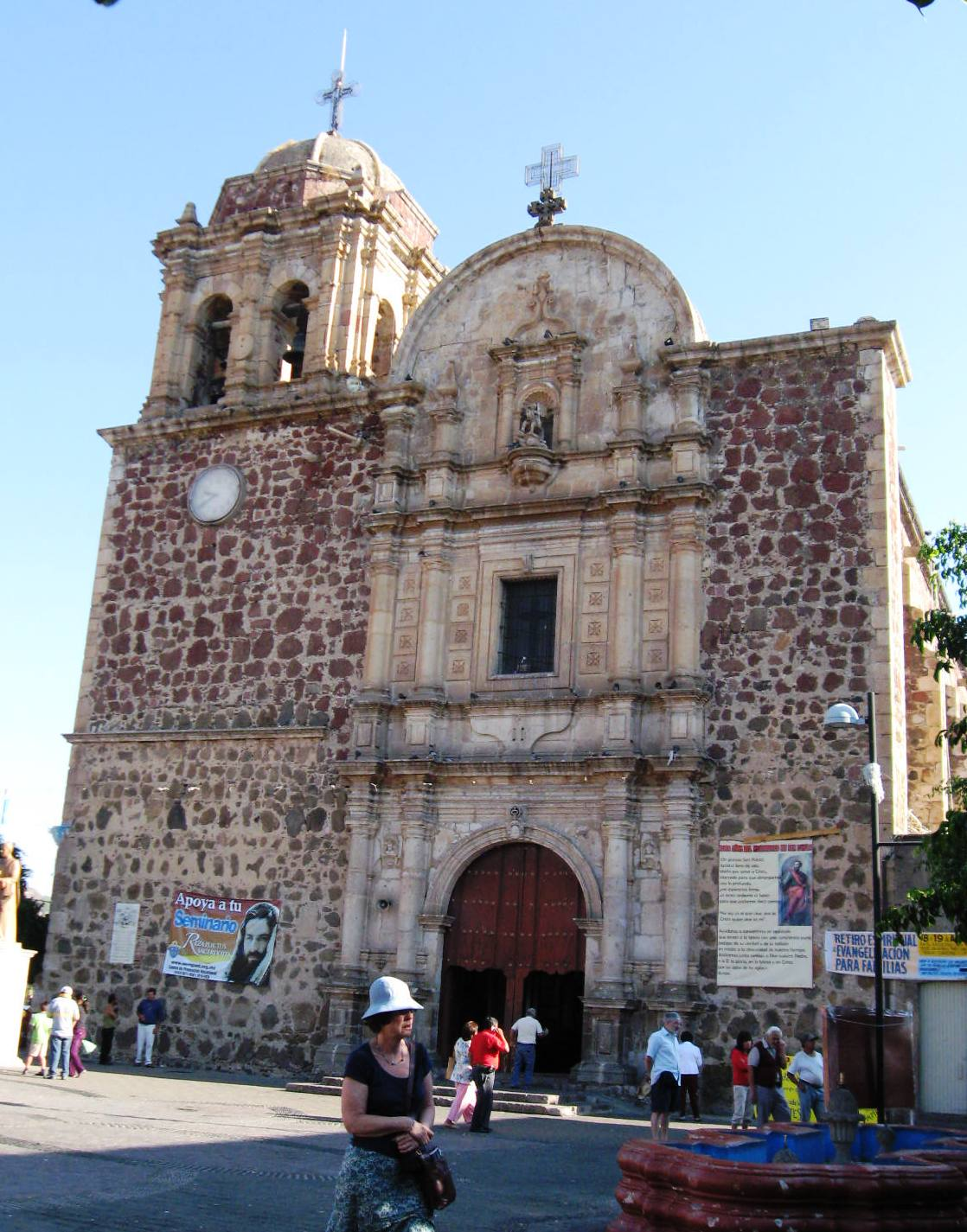
Church of Santiago Apostol, the main church

José Cuervo street

The town of Tequila had a population of 26,809 (2010 census), accounting for about 73% of the municipality's inhabitants. It contains the main parish church, Our Lady of the Purísima Concepción, built in the 18th century by Martín Casillas. The church has a stone facade, a bell tower and inverted truncated pyramid (estipite) pilasters that flank the main portal. The portal has two levels and a crown. The first level contains the door arch with has moulding and a seal and is supported by two Doric columns. The upper portion contains a window with moulding with Doric columns in each side, decorated with curves and vegetable motifs. The crown at the top contains a sculpture of the Archangel Michael in a niche flanked by Doric columns. The side portal is an arched entrance with Tuscan columns and cornice and a cross in relief at the midpoint. Inside are one nave and a Neoclassical main altar. Also inside is a statue of Our Lady of the Conception that dates from 1865.

Notable secular structures include the Quinta Sauza, built in the 1830s, and the La Perseverancia distillery, which was built in 1873. The Quinta Sauza has a large exterior garden with elaborate stone fountains. In the atrium, there are carvings with scenes from the passion of Christ. The facade of the house has reliefs of plants in which there are several entrances. Inside, there is a courtyard with a decorated fountain in the center and the entrance to the chapel in the back, which is decorated with plant and serpent motifs. In La Perseverancia there is a huge work painted by Gabriel Flores in 1969 depicting the making and drinking of tequila. The distillery has guided tours. This distillery also has a museum in front of the municipal palace, containing paintings, photographs, sculptures and the machinery of the La Perseverancia distillery and a room dedicated to regional crafts.

The National Museum of Tequila (MUNAT) is located in the town of Tequila on land that was purchased and set aside by Cipriano Rosales at the beginning of the 20th century for cultural and/or educational activities. The Eduardo González Primary School was established first in 1933 and became a vocational high school in 1979. This was closed in the 1980s due to the deterioration of the building. After extensive remodeling, it reopened as the Casa de Cultura Tequilense (Tequila Cultural Center) and remained so until 2000, when it was converted into the National Museum of Tequila. It is the first museum in the world dedicated to this liquor.

Just 10 km outside the town of Tequila proper is the Sanctuary of Saint Toribio Romo González on the road that leads to the Balneario La Toma, in a community called Agua Caliente. Toribio Romo was recently canonized by John Paul II. The Sanctuary is located in the place where Saint Toribio, as in commonly known was apprehended and shot during the Cristero War.

The National Festival of Tequila is held every year from the end of November to the middle of December. During this event, a Tequila Queen is crowned and the main distillers in the area all have a presence with samples of their tequila. There are also charreada events and a parade with floats, cockfights, mariachis, fireworks and rides. This festival coincides with the feast of Tequila's patron saint, Our Lady of the Purisíma Concepción.

There is a local tradition of a nightly blessing of the town by the parish priest. At 9pm every night, the priest offers blessings by ringing a bell three times, and directing the holy of holyest cross with the sacraments towards all 4 cardinal points. At this moment, everyone in the town stops what they are doing, including turning off things like the television or radio, and stands for the blessing.

== The town and the beverage ==
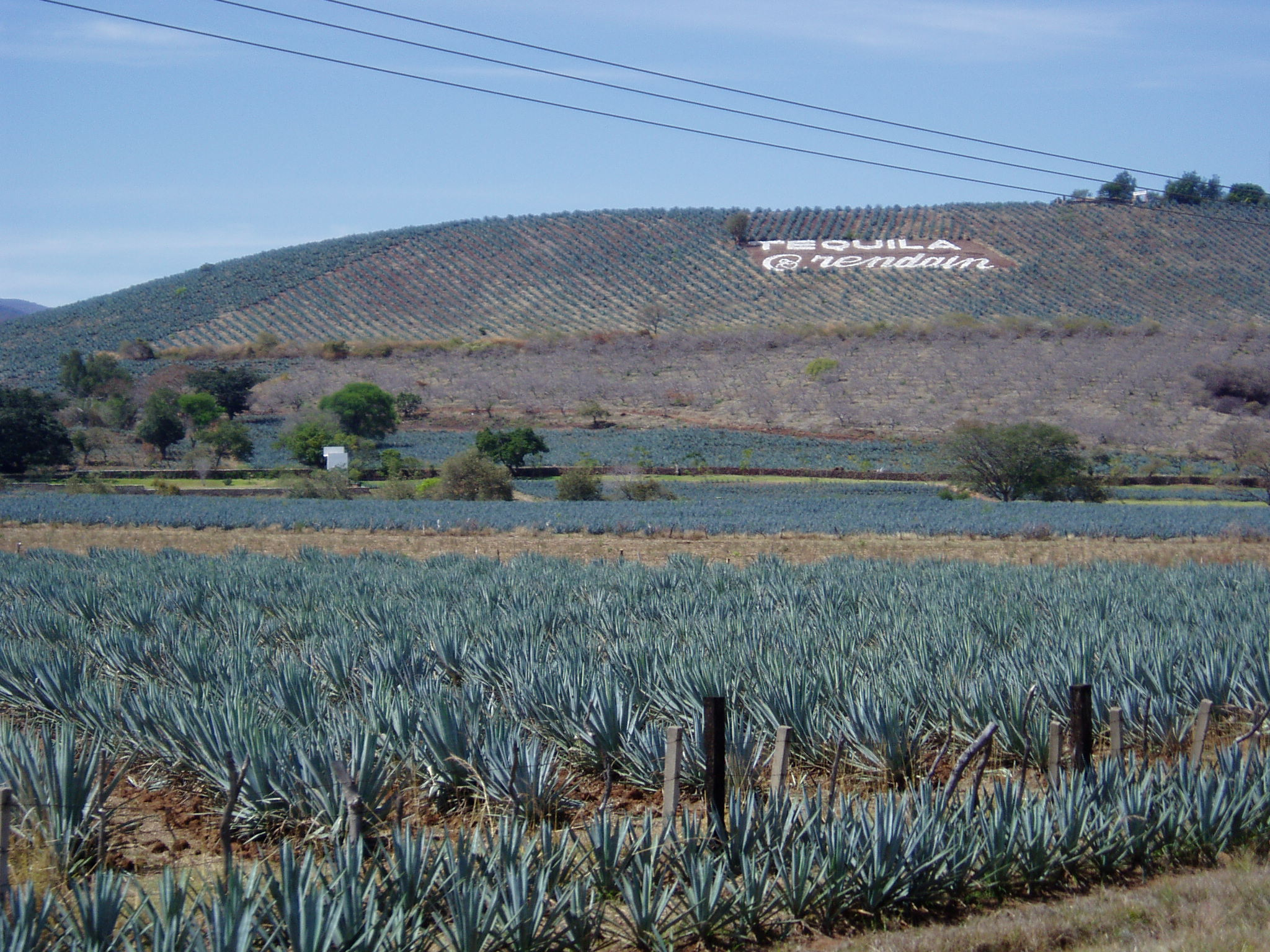
Blue agave fields near Tequila.

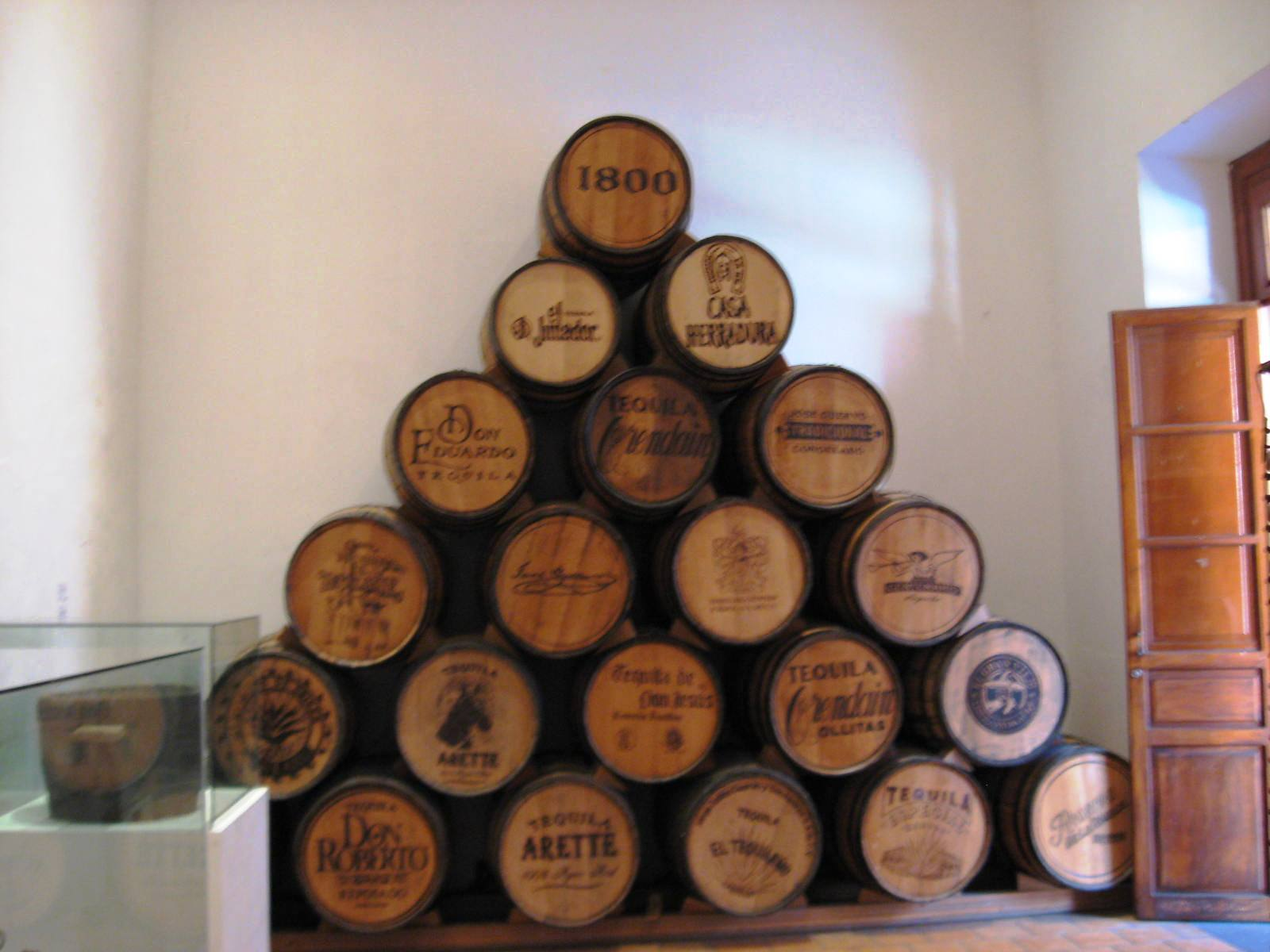
Tequila barrels on display at the National Museum of Tequila

The beverage called tequila is really a variety of mezcal, made wholly or mostly from the blue agave plant. This plant is native to the Tequila area so this version of mescal was named after the town. Use of the agave plant goes far back into the pre-Hispanic period. Traditionally, it was cultivated to combat soil erosion, used as an element in house construction, in the production of cleaning products, and more. The "piña" (lit. pineapple) or heart of the plant was used by the indigenous peoples cooked as a sweet, and as the base for a fermented alcoholic beverage. This beverage was called mescal by the native people and was much like what is called pulque today. By the time the Spanish arrived, the natives had already been cultivating the plant. The Spanish first considered taking the plant back to Spain but decided to develop it and its product in Mexico.

The Spanish introduced distillation to turn the native fermented mescal into what is now known as tequila. The original mescal was already a well-known drink that was sold in towns regularly, and when the Spanish discovered this they used it as the source product for distillation. It was an excellent product because by 1546, soldiers were obliged to mix their water with these agave alcohols, as drinking water was often contaminated. Drinks made from Agave plants rose in popularity very quickly. Agave products were prized to the extent that they were objects of trade over considerable distances, for example, from Arizona's Grand Canyon as much as 450 km eastward to consumers on the Colorado Plateau.

The first large-scale distillery was created in 1600 and over the colonial period demand for the drink resulted in some of the oldest, still-operating enterprises in this area such as: "La Rojeña", founded in 1795; "El Tigre" (now La Constancia) founded in 1823; Destiladora de Occidente (now "Tequila D'Reyes") founded in 1840; La Perseverancia (now Tequila Sauza) founded in 1873; El Llano (now Tequila Azteca) founded in 1876; La Mexicana (now Tequila Orendain) founded 1879.

The progress of tequila as a national drink was not without several "booms" and fall-backs. The initial boom on a global scale that would promote the drink further was when the drink began to captivate the European palette. Mexicans going to Europe discovered that their national drink was famous there, and upon returning they would drink it and promote it in their social circles. In this way we see the globalization process, and the progress of the drink as a symbol of identity for the region. Further, in 1873, the "Mezcal wine" (a former name used when referring to Tequila the drink) from the region of Jalisco was officially named "Tequila", in order to distinguish it from Mezcal spirits produced in the south of Mexico, such as those produced in Oaxaca.

The name "Tequila" has been protected by the Mexican government since 1974, and its use is limited to products distilled from agave grown in certain regions of Mexico. These regions are in the states of Jalisco, Michoacán, Nayarit, and Guanajuato, and parts of the State of Tamaulipas. The lands in Tamaulipas were added later as the need to cultivate blue agave grew, and these lands and the agave grown on them were certified by the Mexican government for quality. The term is also limited to fifteen production facilities such as Tequila Sauza, Tequila Orendaín, and Jorge Salles Cuervo.

Long-established distilleries here produce between 500 and 1000 liters a day but this is not enough to meet the international demand for the product, which has skyrocketed since the 1980s. The number of brands of tequila have also increased exponentially, since the incorporation of national and international investors, politicians, entrepreneurs, distribution intermediaries, marketers, among others, have made their appearance interested in participating in the mezcal market. The popularity of the drink has led to the attraction of thousands of visitors to the area each year to see the fields, distilleries, Museo Nacional de Tequila (The National Museum of Tequila), the Barraca de Tequila and to ride the Tequila Express, which is a train that runs from Guadalajara to tequila country, arriving at the Tequila railway station. The train has 4 cars with a capacity of 68 people and usually requires that tickets be bought a month in advance.

== World Heritage Site ==
Agave Landscape and Ancient Industrial Facilities of Tequila
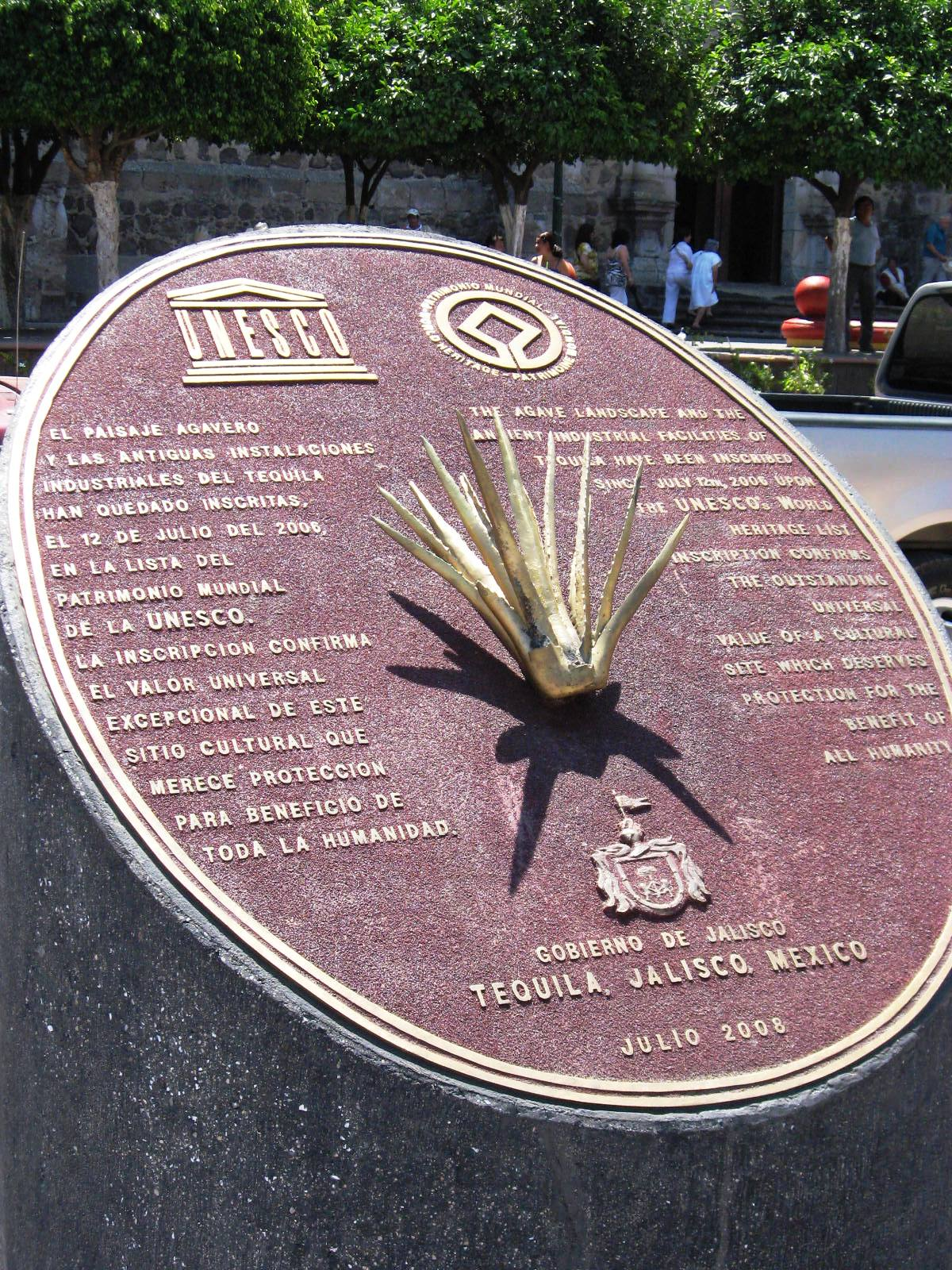
- Plaque commemoration Tequila's inclusion into the World Heritage List
- Interactive map of Agave Landscape and Ancient Industrial Facilities of Tequila
- Location: Tequila, Jalisco, Mexico

Site notes
- Area: 35,019 hectares

UNESCO World Heritage Site
- Type: Cultural
- Criteria: ii, iv, v, vi
- Designated: 2006 (30th session)
- Reference no.: 1209
- Region: Latin America and the Caribbean

The history and culture behind tequila production has led to the town of Tequila and the vast agave fields surrounding it to be declared a World Heritage Site. It encompasses 35,019 hectares between the foothills of the Tequila Volcano and the valley of the Rio Grande de Santiago, which is covered in fields of blue agave. For over 2,000 years, this plant has been used to make fermented drinks and cloth and since the 16th century has been used to make the distilled liquor with the name of Tequila. Both the drink and the culture associated with making it has become absorbed into Mexican identity. Within these fields are the towns of Tequila, Arenal, Amatitan and Teuchitlán with large tequila production facilities. This site contains an inventory of fields, distilleries and factories (active and inactive) as well as "tabernas" (illegal tequila facilities during the Colonial period), the towns and the Teuchitlán archeological sites. Many of the tequila-making facilities are located on large haciendas that date back as far as the 18th century. Most distilleries and haciendas are made of brick and adobe, featuring stucco walls with an ochre lime-wash, stone arches, quoins and window frames. Most are decorated with Neoclassical or Baroque ornamentation. The production of tequila represents the fusion of the pre-Hispanic tradition of making alcohol with agave with European distilling techniques. The Teuchitlán archeological site is of one of the first cultures here that first produced an agricultural society here.

== Tequila tourism ==
The Tequila Route as a tourist destination was created in 2006 and the Tequila Express were created with the aim of promoting the tourism of Tequila into the neighboring municipalities of El Arenal, Amatitán, Magdalena and Teuchitlan, which also contain important tequila facilities, as well as cultural and archeological attractions. Both also go through the vast blue agave fields that were recently named a World Heritage Site. The Tequila Route was created and is supervised by the Consejo Regulador del Tequila, which regulates the production and authenticity of the liquor produced here. Other attractions on the route include archeological sites, old mansions and opal and obsidian mines. The archeological sites primarily belong to a culture known as the Guachimontones located in the municipalities of Teuchitlan and Magdalena. In a number of the old hacienda/distilleries, visitors are invited to try their hand at some of the aspects of tequila making, such as cutting the spines off the agave plant. Most of these haciendas also have tasting rooms and restaurants. Along the route is the Tequila Volcano.

The Tequila Express is a train for tourists that has been in operation since 1997. On Saturdays and Sundays this train takes passengers through tequila country, accompanied by live mariachi music and bilingual guides to the Hacienda San José del Refugio. Another guided tour is Tequila Adventure, which shuttle people in vans to the distilleries of la Cofradía and Mundo Cuervo.

== Geography ==
Tequila is one of the 124 municipalities of Jalisco, located just west of the center of the state. Its territory extends for 1689.11km2, with elevations that vary between 700 and 2,900 meters above sea level. The municipality borders with the main metropolitan region of Guadalajara to the east (Zapopan), and the State of Zacatecas to the north. All of the neighboring municipalities surrounding Mount Tequila conform the greater region of 'Tequila'. These include the adjacent municipalities of Amatitlán, Magdalena, San Juanito de Escobedo, San Martín de Bolaños, San Cristóbal de la Barranca, Hostotipaquillo and, south of Tequila Volcano: Teuchtilán and Ahualulco de Mercado. The original land-subdivision of the region was delineated by the Agave-growing haciendas that are found throughout.

After Independence, the state of Jalisco was originally divided into 26 departments, with Tequila being one of the seats of these departments. After modern municipalities were created, Tequila remained a seat, but of the municipality that bears its name. This municipality contains 207 communities with the most populous (outside of the town of Tequila) being El Salvador, San Martín de las Cañas, Santa Teresa and Potrero de la Rivera aside from the municipal seat. The total population of the municipality is 38,534, 73% of which lives in the municipal seat of Tequila.

The municipality is located on rugged terrain with little flat space except in some valleys. The Santiago y Chico River constitutes the low points of the municipality at 700 meters while the high peaks are located in the south. The highest mountain is Tequila Volcano or Tequila Mountain at 2,900 meters. This as an inactive volcano, not having had an eruption in more than 220,000 years, and dominates the landscape in the center of the municipality. Hiking and other ecotourism is possible here but infrastructure such as roads, security and signs are minimal. The eastern part of the municipality is dominated by the Sierra de los Balcones.

=== Climate ===
Tequila has a tropical savanna climate with some semi-arid influences. It has a dry season in the winter and spring and a rainy season in summer and fall. Temperatures do not vary greatly between summer and winter and average about 22.7 C. The higher elevations have pine and oak forest while the lower elevations have mesquite, nopal, and other vegetation. The municipality has 28,430 hectares of mostly pine forest in the higher mountain areas. The major rivers of the municipality are the Santiago, El Chico and Bolaños and a large number of small streams.

Climate data for Tequila, Jalisco (1991-2020, extremes 1961-present)
Month	Jan	Feb	Mar	Apr	May	Jun	Jul	Aug	Sep	Oct	Nov	Dec	Year
Record high °C (°F)	34.0 (93.2)	37.0 (98.6)	40.0 (104.0)	40.0 (104.0)	41.0 (105.8)	45.0 (113.0)	36.5 (97.7)	37.5 (99.5)	36.0 (96.8)	36.0 (96.8)	35.0 (95.0)	34.0 (93.2)	45.0 (113.0)
Mean daily maximum °C (°F)	27.5 (81.5)	29.4 (84.9)	32.3 (90.1)	34.4 (93.9)	35.8 (96.4)	34.1 (93.4)	30.8 (87.4)	30.8 (87.4)	30.2 (86.4)	30.3 (86.5)	29.2 (84.6)	27.9 (82.2)	31.1 (87.9)
Daily mean °C (°F)	18.6 (65.5)	20.0 (68.0)	22.2 (72.0)	24.2 (75.6)	26.1 (79.0)	26.2 (79.2)	24.2 (75.6)	24.2 (75.6)	23.9 (75.0)	23.1 (73.6)	21.0 (69.8)	19.1 (66.4)	22.7 (72.9)
Mean daily minimum °C (°F)	9.8 (49.6)	10.6 (51.1)	12.1 (53.8)	13.9 (57.0)	16.3 (61.3)	18.3 (64.9)	17.5 (63.5)	17.6 (63.7)	17.7 (63.9)	16.0 (60.8)	12.8 (55.0)	10.3 (50.5)	14.4 (57.9)
Record low °C (°F)	1.0 (33.8)	3.0 (37.4)	4.0 (39.2)	9.0 (48.2)	9.0 (48.2)	9.0 (48.2)	12.0 (53.6)	1.0 (33.8)	11.0 (51.8)	7.0 (44.6)	5.0 (41.0)	1.0 (33.8)	1.0 (33.8)
Average precipitation mm (inches)	22.0 (0.87)	12.3 (0.48)	7.9 (0.31)	1.8 (0.07)	22.9 (0.90)	155.0 (6.10)	253.3 (9.97)	199.9 (7.87)	160.1 (6.30)	49.7 (1.96)	11.6 (0.46)	9.7 (0.38)	906.2 (35.67)
Average precipitation days (≥ 0.1 mm)	1.3	1.0	0.7	0.3	2.1	10.4	17.2	15.3	12.2	4.1	1.1	0.9	66.6
Source: Servicio Meteorológico Nacional

See or edit raw graph data. Most of the municipality's economy is still based on agriculture, employing about 47% of its people. Despite the very visible growing of the blue agave plant, most acres here are still devoted to corn. Other crops include sorghum, beans, mangos, oranges, avocados and squash. Livestock includes beef cattle, dairy cattle, pigs, goats, horses, fowl and bees. The making of tequila employs about 25% of the municipality's population, but brings in the most money. It accounts for almost all the municipality's industrial base. Tourism, such as that related to tequila and ecotourism sites are a growing part of the economy. One example of ecotourism here is the Balneario La Toma, which is located on very rugged terrain with cliffs, promoting rappelling, paragliding and other similar sports. There is some mining here, mostly of opals, gold and silver.

== Sister cities ==
Tequila maintains sister city relations with Cathedral City, California, which is located in the Coachella Valley of Southern California. Tequila Council members, business promoters, and Rotary Club officials have attended many celebrations hosted by the California city, including the Tequila Festival, held in 1998, which highlighted the arts, culture, and products of Tequila, Jalisco. The city of Cathedral City has since renewed an annual tradition of celebrating the twenty year anniversary of sister city, which in 2016 happened to coincide with the 35th anniversary of incorporation of Cathedral City. The Taste of Jalisco Festival was held in downtown, the second year honoring the culture, music, and food of the city's diverse Mexican heritage.

Other sister cities include Jelenia Góra, Poland.
