= Tequila Express =

Mexican passenger train

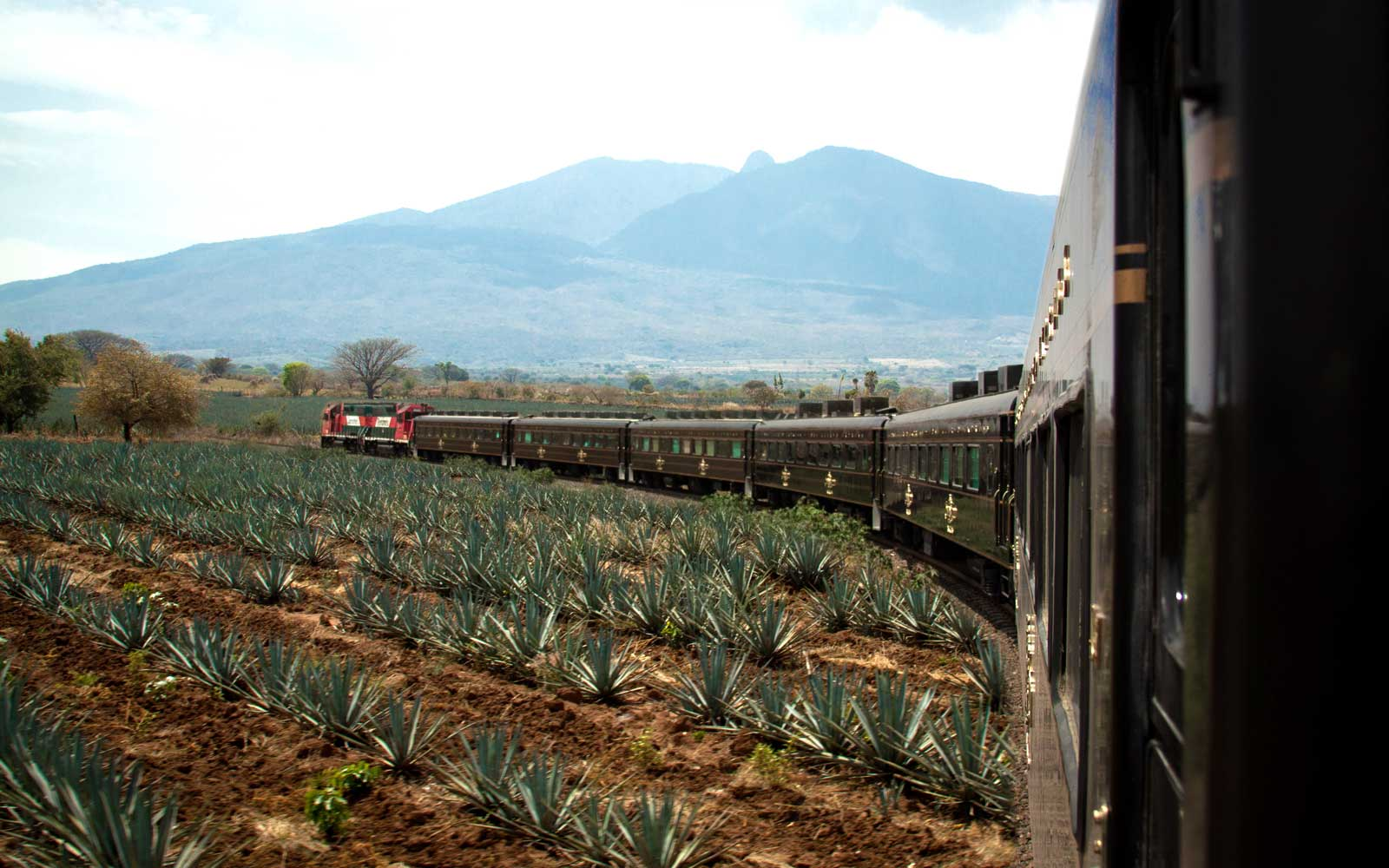
- Blue Agave (Agave tequilana) in a Jalisco field

Overview
- Service type: Tourist train
- Locale: Jalisco, Mexico
- First service: 1997
- Current operator: Cámara de Comercio de Guadalajara

Route
- Termini: Guadalajara; Tequila
- Average journey time: 105–180 minutes
- Line used: Line T

On-board services
- Seating arrangements: Reserved coach seat
- Observation facilities: Observation car

Technical
- Rolling stock: 2 × GE U23B locomotives 2–4 × coach cars 1 × observation car (used occasionally)
- Track gauge: 1,435 mm (4 ft 8 1/2 in)
- Track owner: Ferromex

The Tequila Express is a Mexican tourist passenger train service that operates from Guadalajara, Jalisco, to the Sauza Tequila distillery in the municipality of Tequila. The train service is so named because it features tequila tastings and transports its passengers through blue agave fields to the distillery "La Perseverancia" in Tequila.

The service began operating in 1997. The service is operated by The Cámara de Comercio de Guadalajara (Guadalajara Chamber of Commerce). The excursion includes live mariachi music, a tour of the distillery and Quinta Sauza, as well as a food buffet on the Quinta premises. The Encuentro Internacional del Mariachi y la Charrería festival is held in Guadalajara.

== Tequila Herradura Express ==
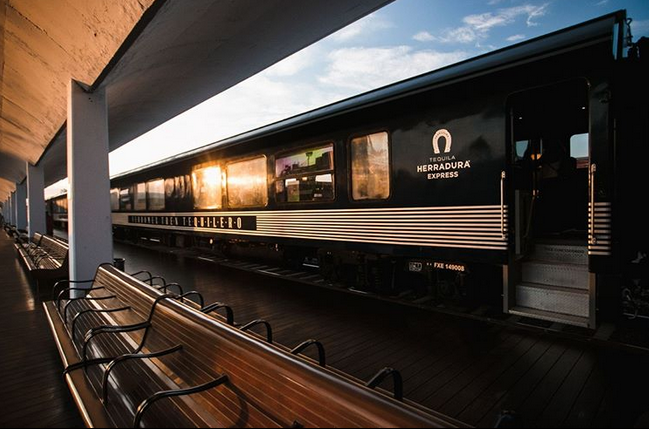
The Tequila Herradura Express at Guadalajara station

Another tourist train service named Tequila Herradura Express, operates between Guadalajara and Amatitán. They launched on March 23, 2017 in partnership with Ferromex, was introduced by the Tequila Herradura distillery as a luxury tourism project promoting the Guadalajara region. The entire tour consists of a trip to the distillery of this brand, accompanied by a meal with typical Jalisco folk music and dances. The train makes round trips from the city of Guadalajara to Amatitán, where the Casa Herradura has been located since 1870.

== Gallery ==
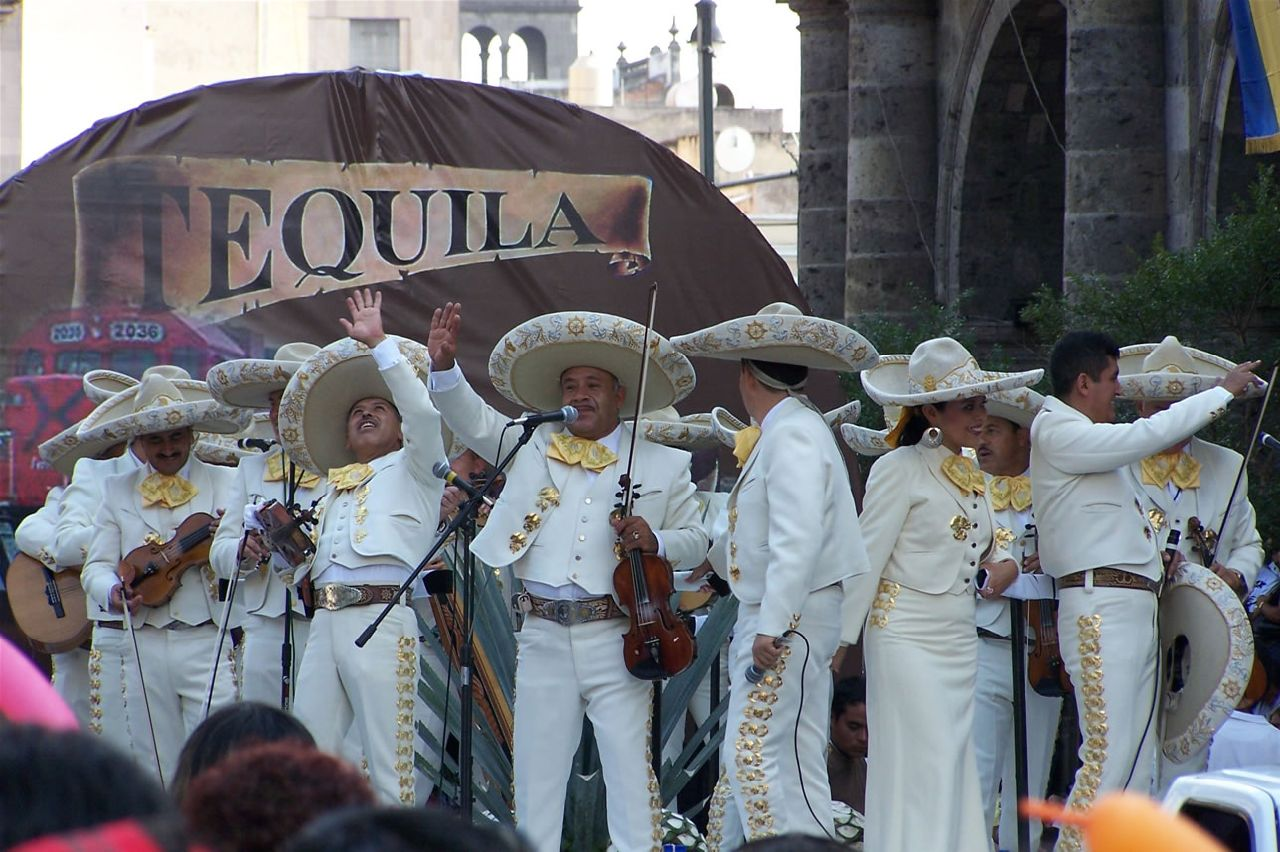
Mariachis on stage in Guadalajara in front of a Tequila Express banner

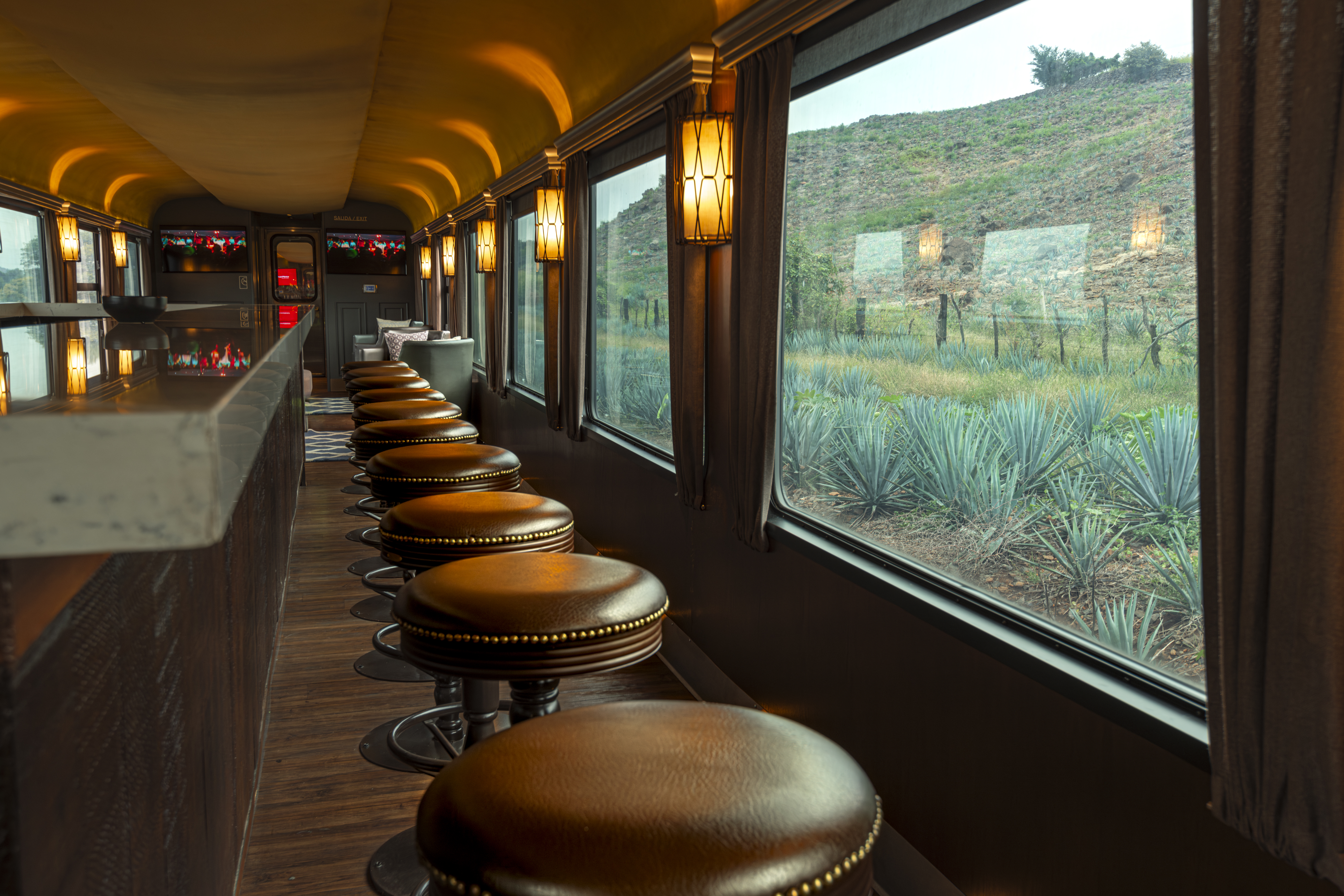
Bar interior
