= Ferromex =

Mexican railway company

Grupo Mexico Transporte Ferromex
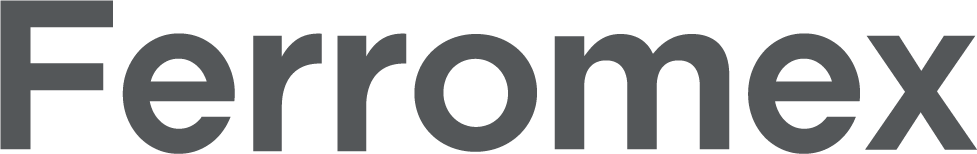

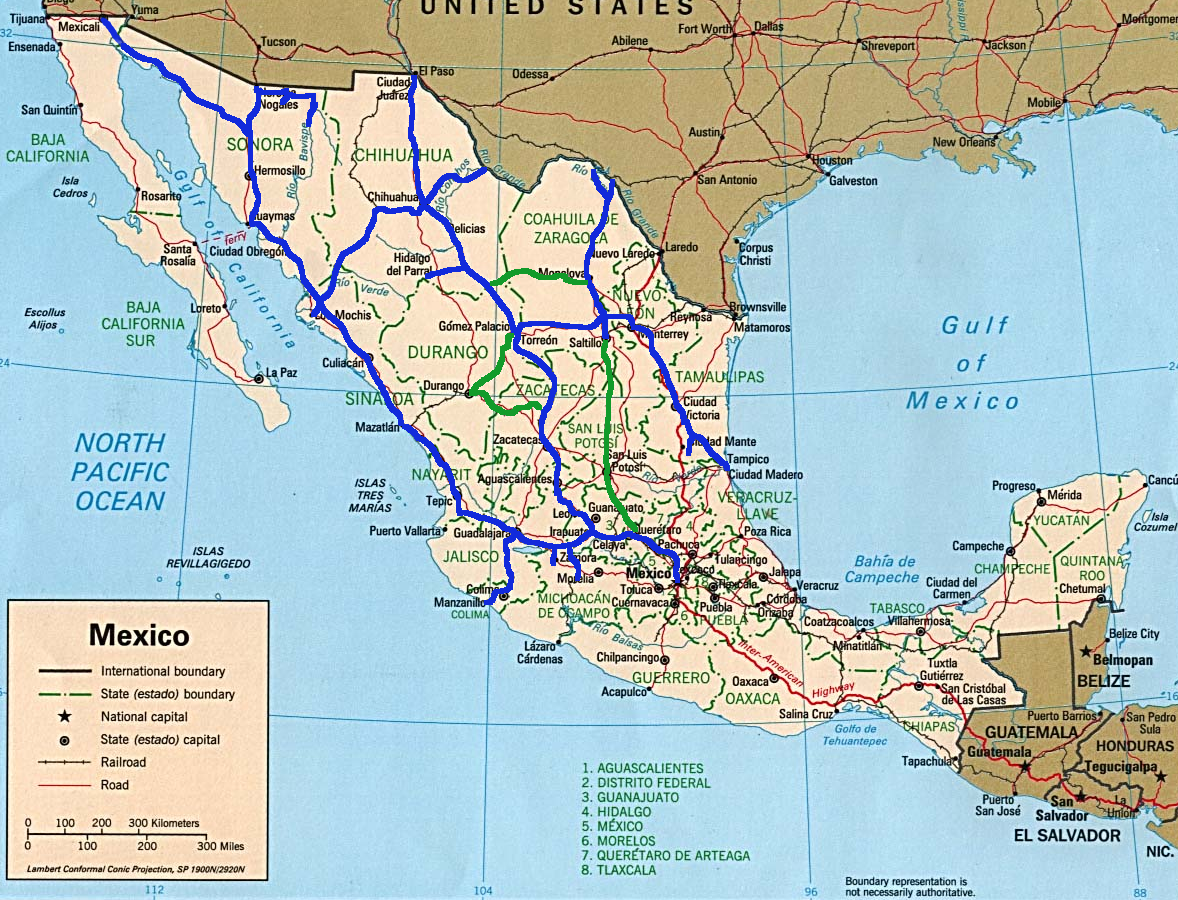
- Ferromex system map (own rails in blue, trackage rights in green)

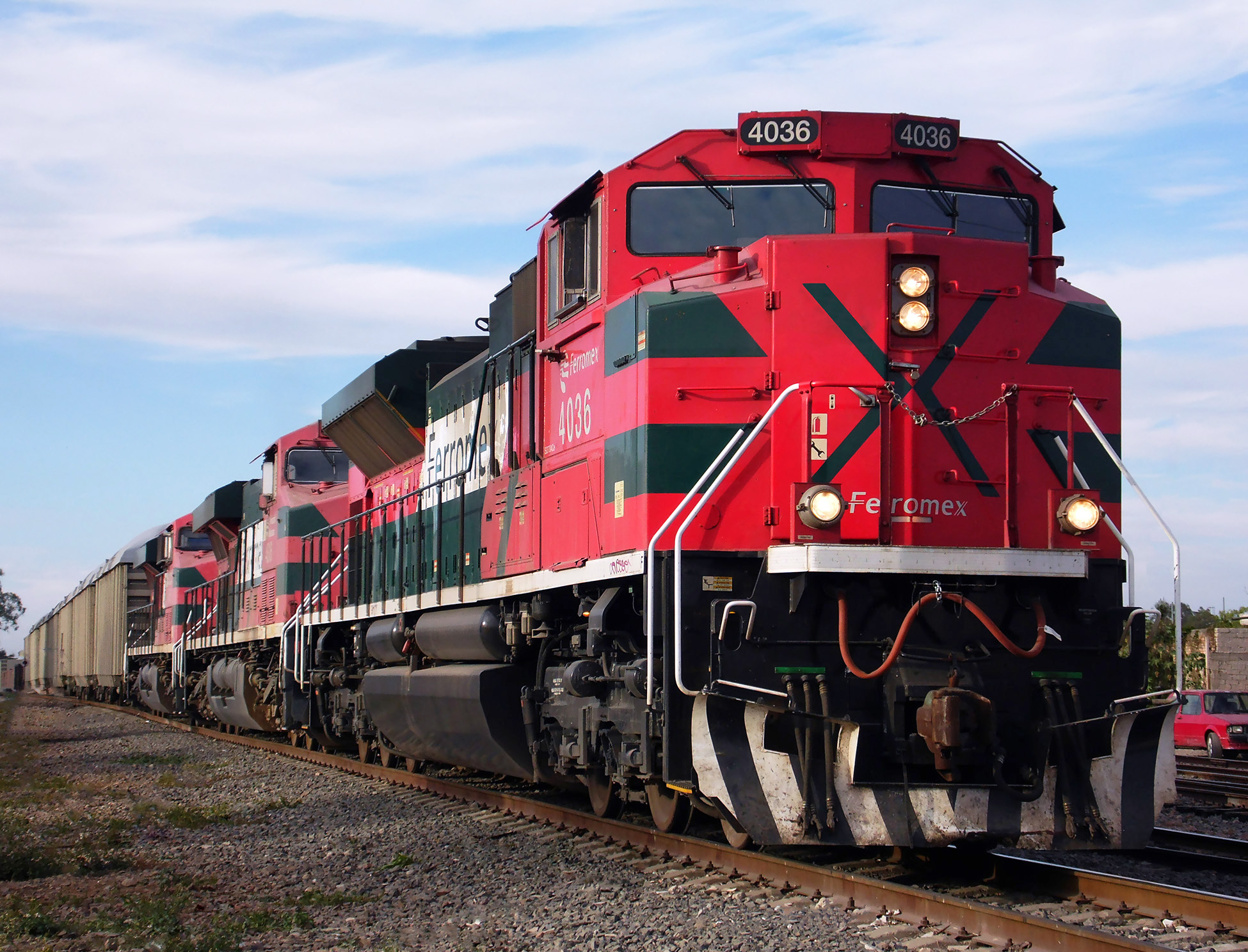
- FXE 4036, an EMD SD70ACe, in Tepic, Nayarit

Overview
- Parent company: Grupo México (74%); Union Pacific (26%)
- Headquarters: Mexico City
- Reporting mark: FXE
- Locale: Mexico
- Dates of operation: 1998–present
- Predecessor: Ferrocarriles Nacionales de México

Technical
- Track gauge: 1,435 mm (4 ft 8 1/2 in) standard gauge
- Length: 12,100 km (7,500 mi)

Other
- Website: ferromex.mx

Grupo México Transportes (GMXT), doing business as Ferromex (reporting mark FXE; syllabic abbreviation of Ferrocarril Mexicano, 'Mexican Railway'), is a private rail consortium that operates the largest (by mileage) railway in Mexico with combined mileage (Ferromex + Ferrosur) of 12,100 kilometres (7,500 mi) and is often classed with North American Class I railroads. The Grupo México owns 74% and Union Pacific Corporation owns 26% of the company.

== History ==
Ferromex began operations on February 19, 1998, after Grupo Ferroviario Mexicano, a consortium composed of Grupo México (74%) and Union Pacific Railroad (26%), was awarded the concession to operate the railway network after submitting bids of 414 million pesos for the Chihuahua-Pacific and 3.1527 million pesos for the North Pacific in July 1997, following the privatization of most of the government-owned railways under President Ernesto Zedillo Ponce de León.

=== Attempted merger with Ferrosur ===
In November 2005, Grupo México, the majority owner of Ferromex, purchased Infraestructura y Transportes Ferroviarios, the parent company of Ferrosur, another of Mexico's Class I railroads, in a US$309 million stock transaction. The Mexican Federal Competition Commission (CFC) had rejected a proposed 2002 merger of Ferromex and Ferrosur amid opposition from Ferromex competitor Grupo Transportación Ferroviaria Mexicana (TFM).

Following the November 2005 purchase of Ferrosur by Grupo México, Kansas City Southern de México (KCSM), successor to TFM, petitioned the Mexican government to block the merger of Ferrosur and Ferromex. The CFC rejected the merger in June 2006 and stated that the merger would have led to excessive concentration in the railway industry to the detriment of consumers and competing shippers. However, in March 2011, a tribunal ruled in Grupo México's favor, and the merger was permitted.

=== Failed participation in the privatization of Trenes Argentinos Cargas ===
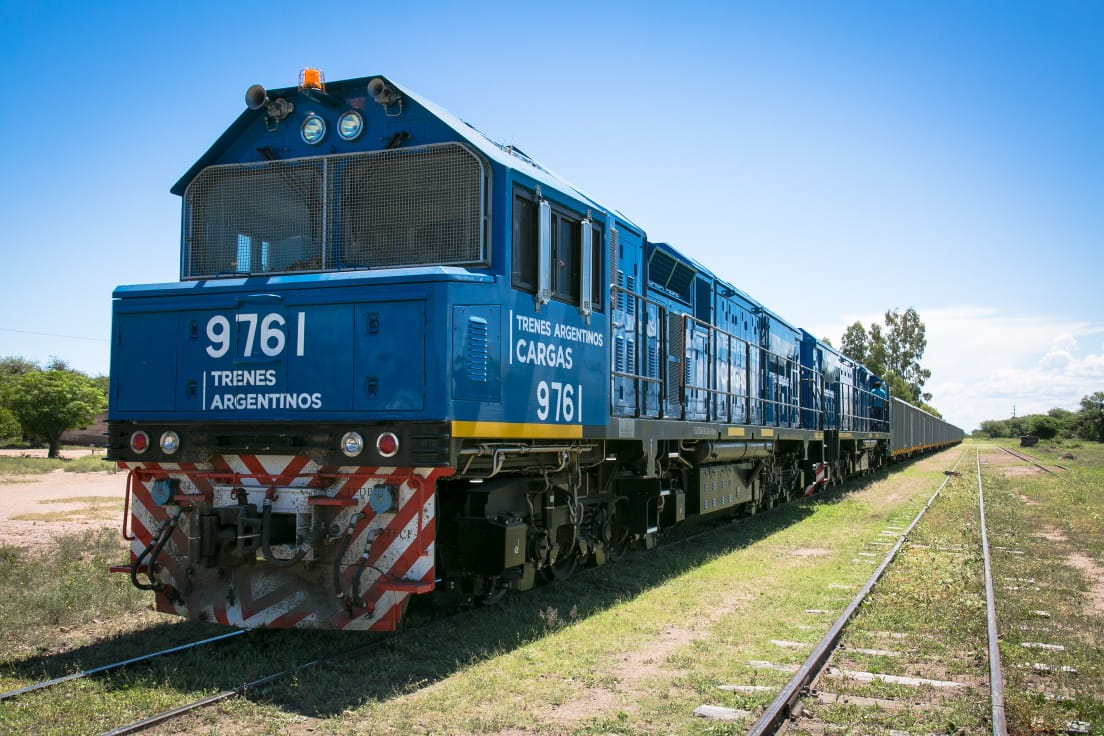
A train operated by the state-owned holding company Trenes Argentinos Cargas. Grupo México had expressed interest in participating and securing the concession from the Argentine railway freight company

In November 2025, Grupo México Transportes expressed interest in participating in the bidding process for the reprivatization and concession of the freight lines of the Belgrano, San Martín, and Urquiza railways, currently operated by the state-owned holding company Trenes Argentinos Cargas, which is in the process of liquidation amid the wave of privatization being carried out by the government of Argentine President Javier Milei.

In December 2025, GMXT CEO Bernardo Ayala arrived in Argentina to hold meetings with government officials involved in the privatization process of the state-owned freight holding company, as well as with companies who currently transport their goods via the three lines, presenting the Group’s plans for the three lines. Ayala promised that the Group will invest more than $3 billions if awarded the concession.

Although the privatization, sale, and liquidation process was initially intended to be carried out in phases—with the shops, rolling stock, and tracks being awarded as separate business units, Grupo México requested that the bidding documents be amended, seeking a comprehensive (vertical) for the complete operation of the three lines for 50 years, along with access to the tax, legal, and fiscal benefits offered by the Incentive Regime for Large Investments (RIGI), given the volume of money to be invested in the concessioned lines, along with the fact that the Group plans to bring new locomotives and railcars from Mexico.

Grupo México subsequently raised the possibility of taking over the rail networks currently operated under concession by Ferroexpreso Pampeano, a subsidiary of the Techint steel group, and Ferrosur Roca, a subsidiary of the Loma Negra–Pampa Energía construction holding company, whose concessions expire in April and September 2026, given the business diversification that this would entail (access to the Vaca Muerta oil and gas Basin in the case of the network operated and concessioned to Ferrosur, and the operation of the grains rail network in the province of La Pampa, the southern parts of the provinces of Santa Fe and Córdoba, and the western, central, and southern parts of the province of Buenos Aires currently operated by Ferro Expreso Pampeano—along with access to the hinterland of the Ingeniero White Port in Bahía Blanca, the main port on Argentina’s coast, also dominated by Ferro Expreso).

In April 2026, several Argentine media outlets reported that Grupo México was going to withdraw from the Trenes Argentinos Cargas bidding process, allegedly after failing to convince the government to change certain provisions in the bidding documents, which would favor a joint venture of agricultural export companies also vying for the freight holding company’s concession. In June 2026, just a few months before the formal launch of the bidding process, GMXT denied those rumors, and also announced a strategic alliance with Wabtec Corporation to strengthen its bid for the Argentine holding company’s concession.

In August 2026, the Argentine government made a series of changes to the bidding documents, at the request of the Grupo México-Wabtec alliance, to allow for the comprehensive (vertical) for the complete operation of the three lines to be put out to concession, a move that also sparked discontent among the joint venture of agricultural export companies that are also competing for the concession of the Argentine railway holding company.

However, in October 2026, just three weeks before November 11—the date on which the winner of the bid will be announced— Grupo México/Ferromex announced that it would permanently withdraw from the bidding process for the Argentine railway holding company, as it was dissatisfied with the Argentine government regarding certain provisions in the bidding documents and discrepancies therein (the main point of contention, and the source of anger for Grupo México, was the so-called “Open Access” system, which allows any freight operator to operate on the networks to be concessioned by paying tolls to the concessionaire, whereas GMXT/Ferromex sought a vertically integrated or comprehensive operation of the three lines to be concessioned).

== Passenger services ==
Ferromex hosts the Ferrocarril Chihuahua al Pacífico "ChePe" railroad, a tourist line that runs through the Copper Canyon. Ferromex also operates the Tequila Express, which runs from Guadalajara to a tequila distillery in Amatitán.

== Other ==
Grupo México Transportes, with Fundación Grupo México, operates Dr. Vagón, a hospital train that offers free, complete healthcare for hard to reach communities in Mexico.

== Rolling stock ==
In March 1999, Ferromex reached an agreement with GE Transportation Systems to purchase 50 AC4400CW locomotives with 4,400 HP, with plans to acquire 110 more units over the next two years. The investment totaled $95 million, bringing Ferromex's locomotive fleet to 564 locomotives. Two AC4400s replaced three conventional 3,000 HP locomotives, primarily used on the Colima–Ciudad Guzmán section, which features gradients of up to 2%. In January 2011, Ferromex ordered 44 new SD70ACe locomotives from EMD, its first order since 2006.

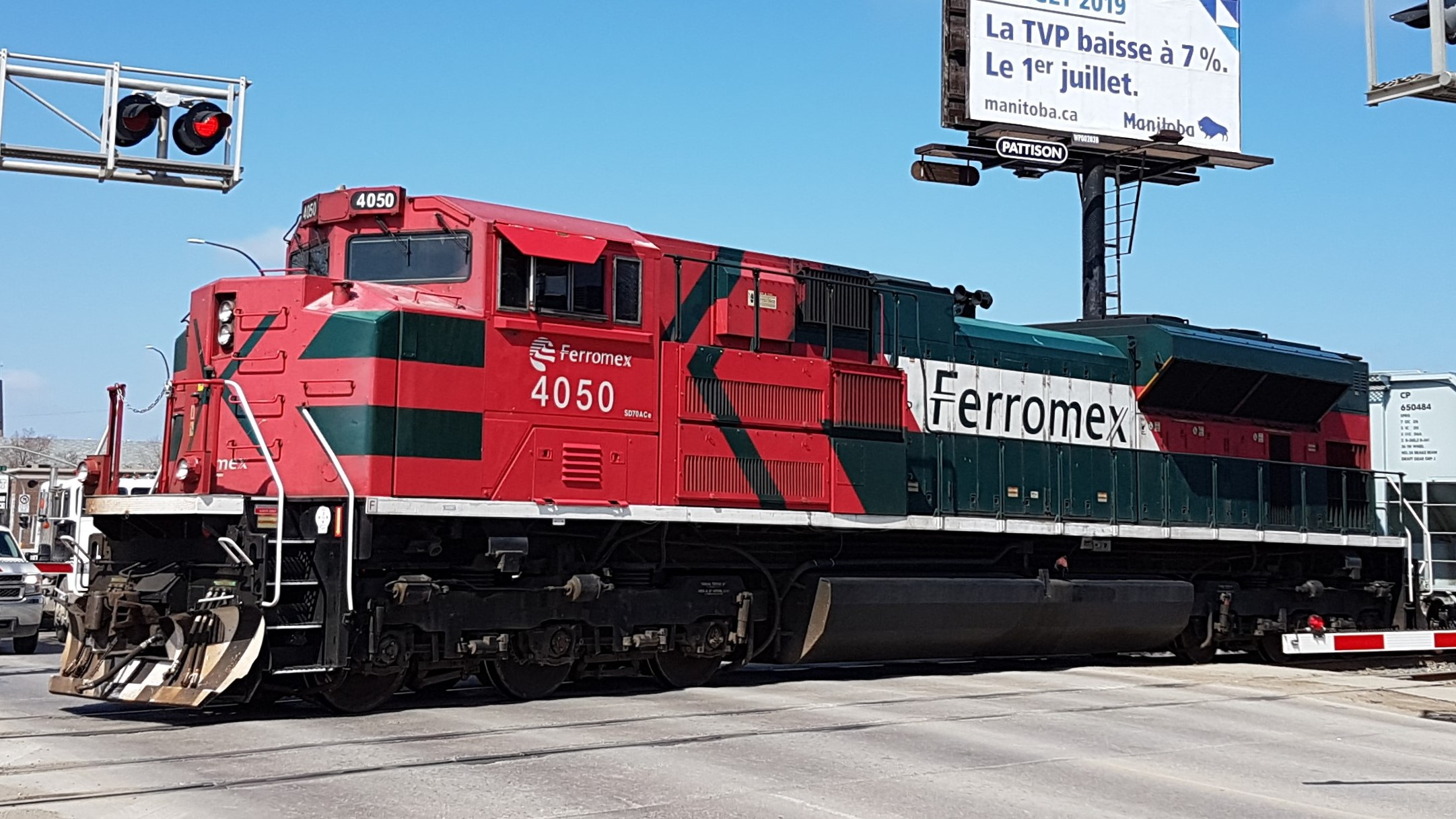
FXE 4050, an EMD SD70ACe in Winnipeg, Manitoba on the CPKC Railway's Emerson Subdivision

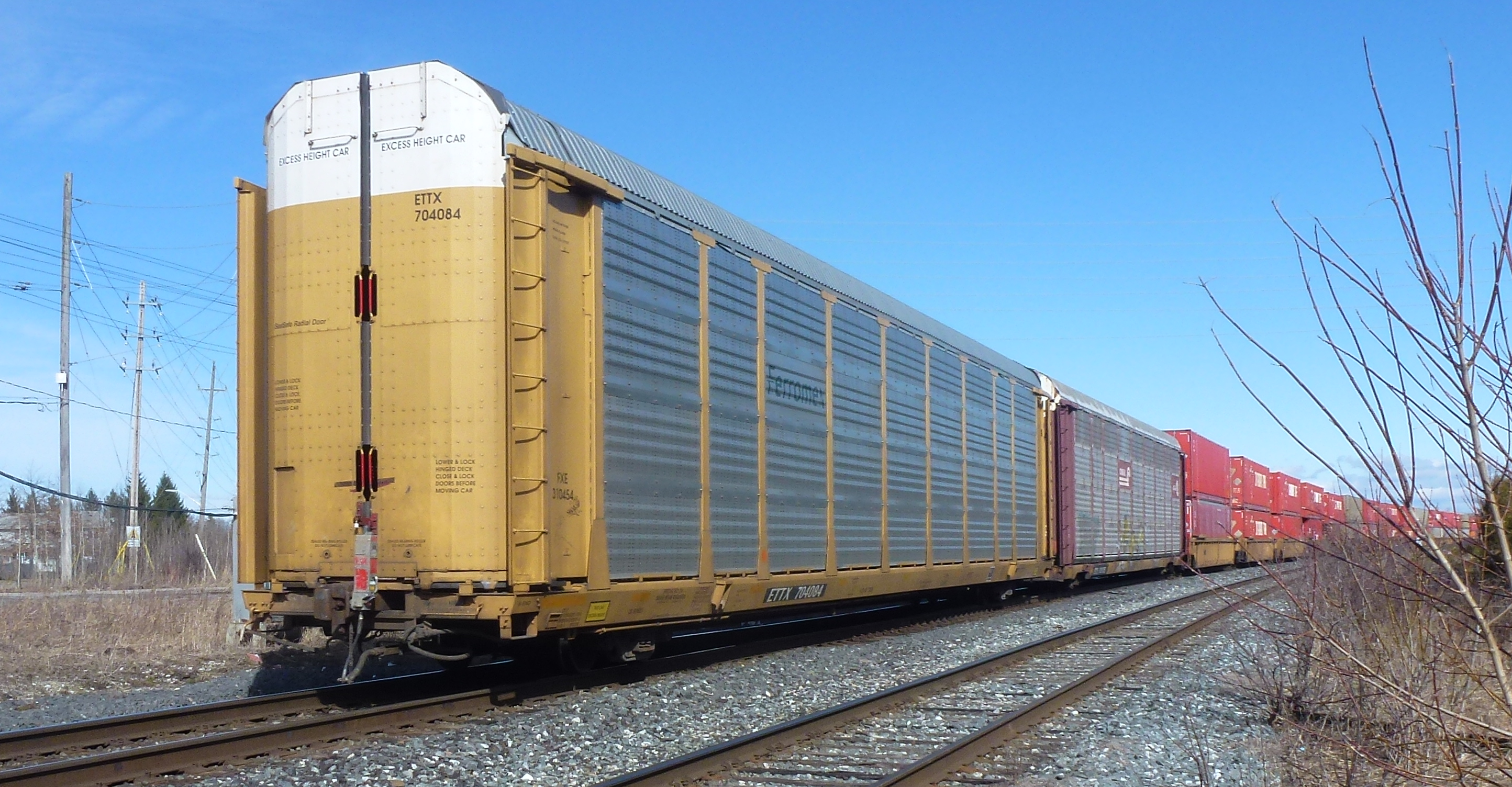
A Ferromex-branded autorack owned by TTX Company in Bolton, Ontario

== See also ==
- List of Mexican railroads
- Rail transport in Mexico
