= Line B (Kansas City Southern de México) =

Railway line in Mexico

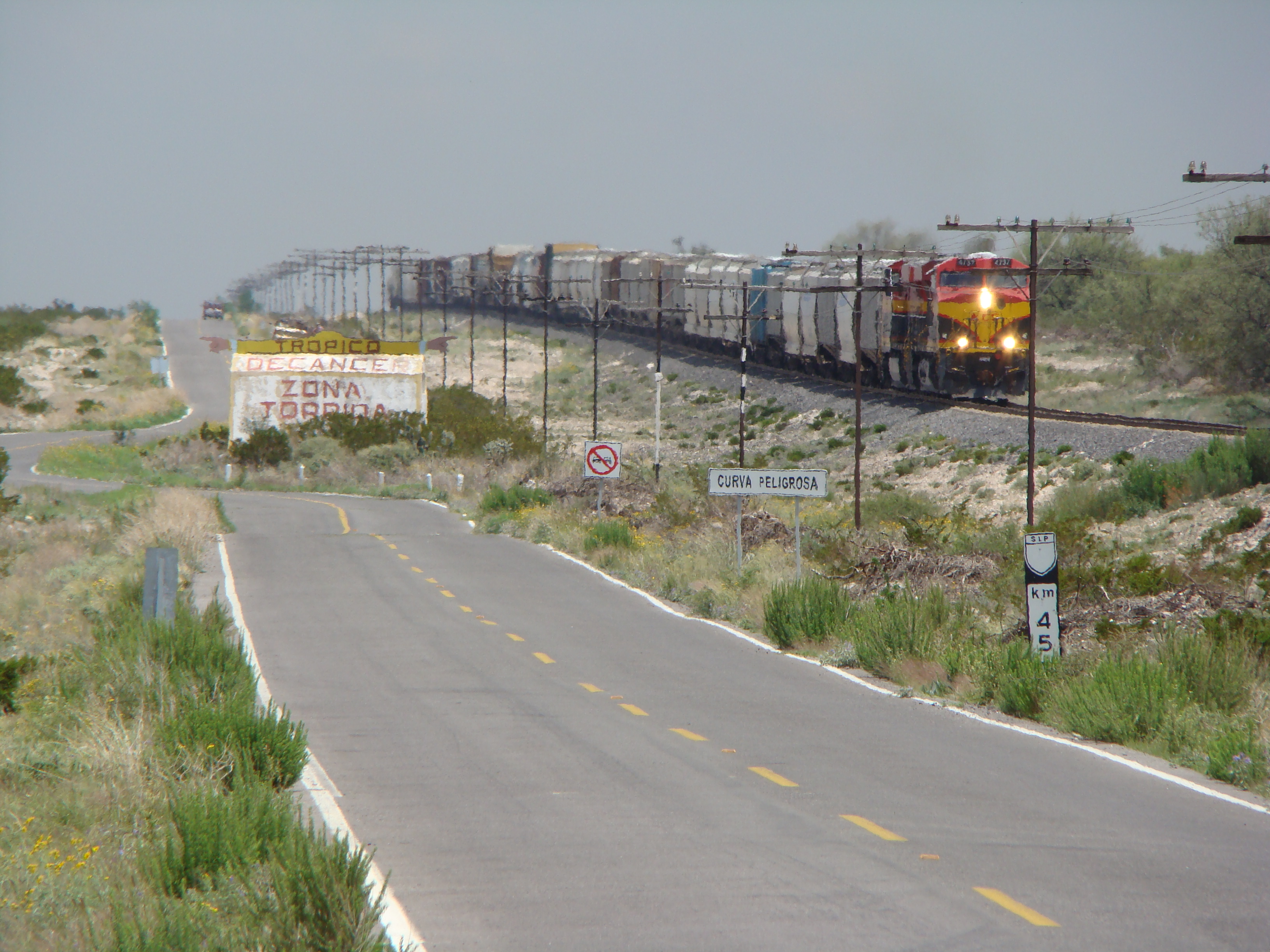
- KCSM No. 4637, GE ES44AC at Trópico de Cáncer (Tropic of Cancer) marker in San Luis Potosí, Mexico

Overview
- Native name: Línea B
- Owner: Federal government of Mexico
- Locale: Mexican Plateau
- Termini: Nuevo Laredo; Mexico City

Service
- Type: Freight rail
- System: CPKC
- Operators: CPKC de México; Ferromex (Saltillo–Querétaro–Mexico City); Ferrovalle (Maravillas–Mexico City)

History
- Work began: 14 October 1880; 145 years ago
- Completed: 1 November 1887; 138 years ago

Technical
- Line length: 1,350 km (840 mi)
- Number of tracks: 1–2
- Track gauge: 1,435 mm (4 ft 8 1/2 in) standard gauge
- Old gauge: 3 ft (914 mm)

The Line B (Spanish: Línea B) is a 1,350-kilometre (840 mi) railway line located in Mexican Plateau. It connects between Mexico City and Nuevo Laredo. At its northern terminus in Nuevo Laredo, the line directly intercharges with the Union Pacific Railroad and Kansas City Southern Railway, where the Patrick J. Ottensmeyer International Railway Bridge (formerly known as Texas Mexican Railway International Bridge) over the Rio Grande connects to Laredo in Texas. At its southern terminus in Mexico City, where the line ends at Ferrovalle Yard.

== History ==
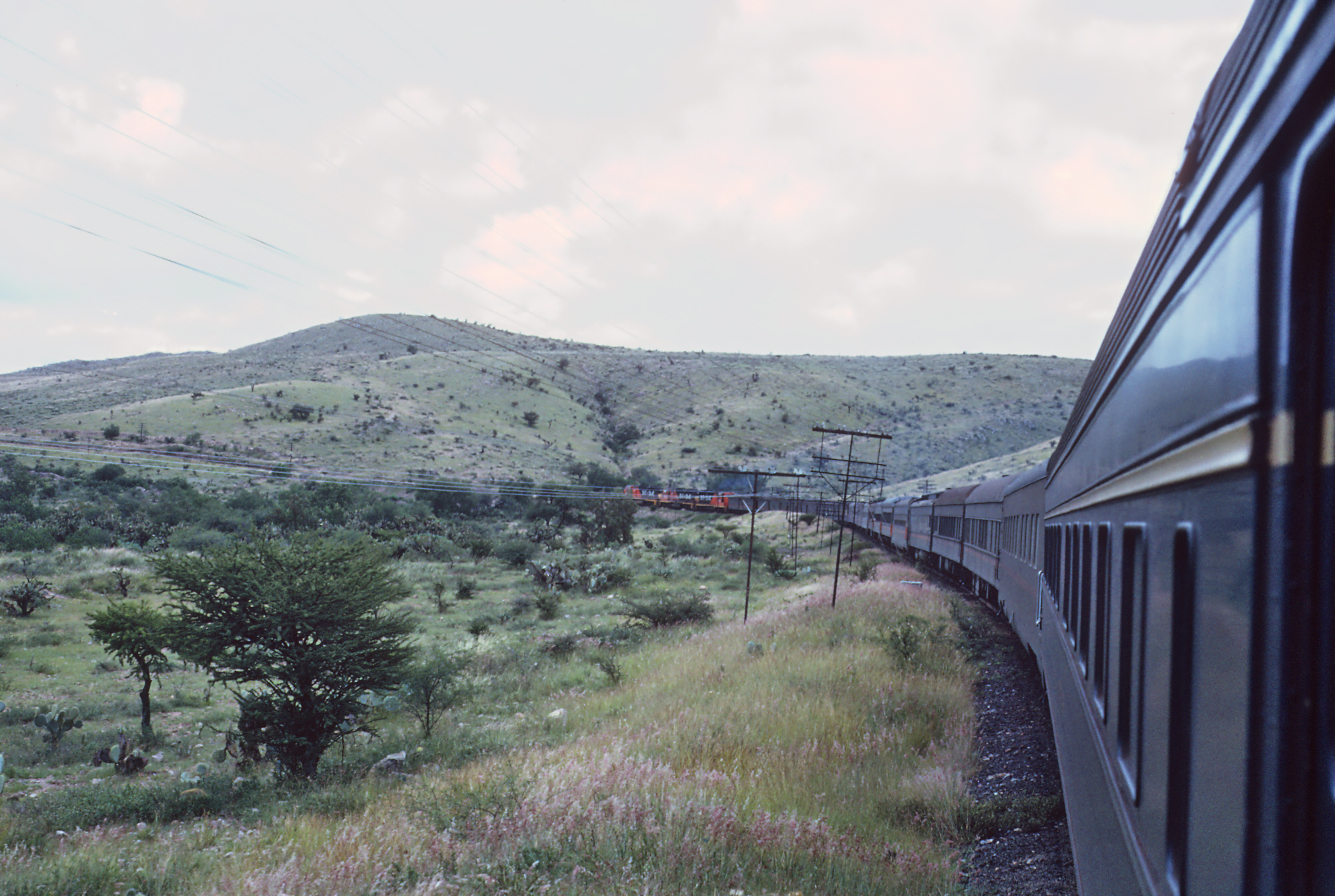
The Águila Azteca train at the south of San Luis Potosí in 1966.

The American railway company Denver & Rio Grande Railroad owned by Messrs. William J. Palmer and James Sullivan, formed the Mexican Construction Company on November 12, 1877. President Porfirio Díaz gives the concession to build the railway between Mexico City and Nuevo Laredo on September 13, 1880, and construction began on October 14. In 1883, a bridge was completed across the Rio Grande to Nuevo Laredo, making the second Mexico–United States rail connection, after El Paso–Juárez which completed in 1882. The same year, contruction of the line was suspended after Denver and Rio Grande Railroad give up its concession, due to insufficient capital, and lost of interest the project.

On May 23, 1886, the construction company was sold to Eckstein Norton, representative of the Mexican National Railway, and completed the main line between Nuevo Laredo and Mexico City using 3 ft (914 mm) narrow gauge on November 1, 1887. The line was known as the International Line. Reconstruction of the line to standard gauge began on December 31, 1901, and the gauge conversion was completed in November 1903. On March 28, 1908, the National Railroad of Mexico was merged into Ferrocarriles Nacionales de México.

In 1995, President Ernesto Zedillo announced privatization of the line, as Ferrocarriles Nacionales de México was faced financial difficulties. The Grupo Transportación Ferroviaria Mexicana was awarded the concession of the line with a bid of 11,071.9 million pesos in December 1996. The line subsequently became part of Transportación Ferroviaria Mexicana (later Kansas City Southern de México).

In 2015, Kansas City Southern de México installed 79, 900 of concrete ties and 40 tk/km of 136 pound on the Nuevo Laredo–Monterrey section. The bridge along the line was reconstructed two central support, replaced the existing metal girders for ballast concrete beams to increase train speed limits.

In December 2024, the construction on the second crossborder bridge in Laredo–Nuevo Laredo was completed, which ended the bottleneck created by the previous single-tracked bridge. KCS's CEO and President, Patrick "Pat" J. Ottensmeyer had pushed for the new bridge during his tenure at KCS, prior to the merger with Canadian Pacific Railway. He died in July 2024, and CPKC's directors named the new bridge in his memory. The second bridge was opened on February 6, 2025.

From May 30 to June 7, 2024, the Canadian Pacific 2816 steam locomotive, also known as "Empress", was used for their Final Spike Steam Tour in Mexico. The tour ran from Calgary in Canada, to Mexico City, passing through Laredo–Nuevo Laredo on May 28, with a stop in Monterrey on May 31. On June 9, the locomotive departed from Mexico City for its return trip north, which arrived in Laredo on June 11.

== Operation ==
The line is owned by the federal government of Mexico, with CPKC as the primary operator.

The southern section of Line B, between Querétaro and Mexico City, is also used by Ferromex, which shares the tracks with CPKC's Line AQ, between Querétaro and Maravillas in Hidalgo. Ferromex also has trackage rights between Querétaro and Saltillo. The section between Maravillas and Mexico City is the northern portion of Ferrovalle.

== Projects ==
=== Proposed Amtrak service to Monterrey ===
In October 2024, the American national passenger railroad company Amtrak have proposed a route connecting San Antonio in Texas with Monterrey. According to the Texas Passenger Rail Advisory Committee, the proposed route would pass through Dallas and Austin in Texas. For the cross-border segment, two possible routes were being considered, either through Laredo or McAllen.

=== Laredo–Nuevo Laredo Elevated Guideway ===
On October 3, 2024, United States President Donald Trump proposed the Green Corridors Intelligent Freight Transportation System as an alternative to railway transportation at the Laredo–Nuevo Laredo border, in accordance with the US$535 million allocated under the 33rd. This permit consists of the elevated guideway and bridge over the Rio Grande which connects inland terminals near Monterrey, Mexico, in the state of Nuevo Leon and near Interstate 35, north of Laredo, Texas, its approaches, and any land, structures, installations, or equipment appurtenant thereto located on the United States side of the international boundary between the United States and Mexico, located just downstream from the Laredo–Colombia Solidarity International Bridge at the connection between Texas State Highway 255 and the Nuevo Leon State Highway Spur 1.

== See also ==
- Laredo–Nuevo Laredo
- Mexican Federal Highway 85
- Águila Azteca (train)
- Line A (Ferromex)
- Texas Mexican Railway
- Rail transport in Mexico
