= Line A (Ferromex) =

Railway line in Mexico

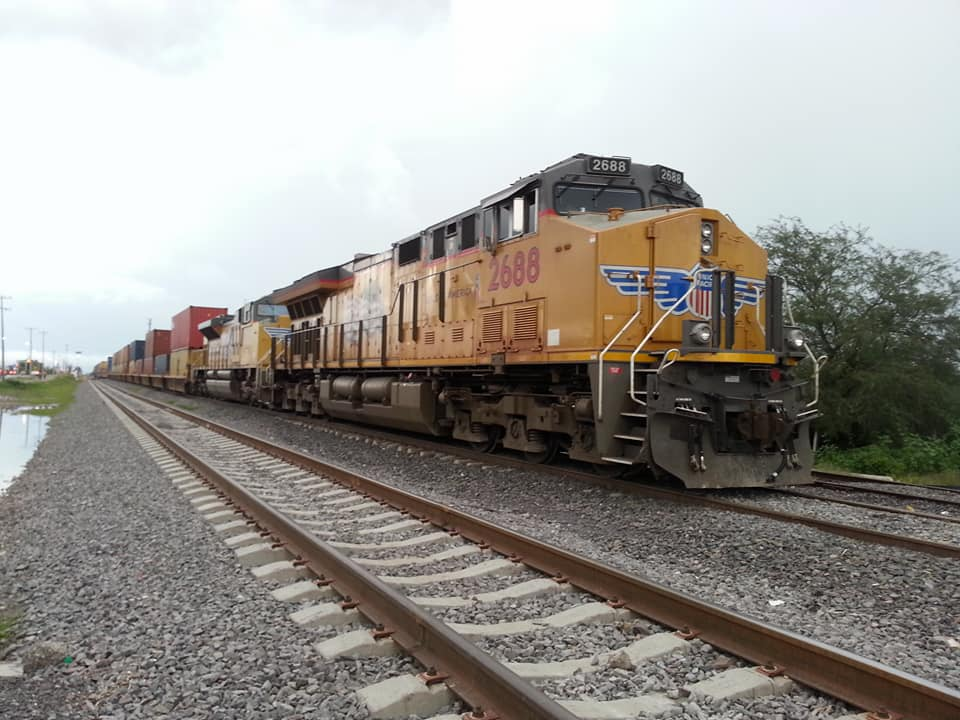
- A Union Pacific ET44AC No. 2688 leads an intermodal train on the Ferromex Guadalajara–Torreón route at León, Guanajuato.

Overview
- Native name: Línea A
- Owner: Federal government of Mexico
- Locale: Mexican Plateau
- Termini: Ciudad Juarez; Mexico City
- Stations: 63 (defunct)

Service
- Type: Freight rail
- System: Ferromex
- Operators: Ferromex; Línea Coahuila Durango (Torreón–Escalón); CPKC de México (Guanajuato–Querétaro–Mexico City); Ferrovalle (Huehuetoca–Mexico City)

History
- Work began: 1880; 146 years ago
- Opened: March 1884; 142 years ago

Technical
- Line length: 1,224.16 mi (1,970.09 km)
- Number of tracks: 1–2
- Track gauge: 1,435 mm (4 ft 8 1/2 in) standard gauge
- Electrification: Querétaro–Mexico City: 25 kV 60 Hz AC overhead line (1994–96)

The Line A (Spanish: Línea A) is a 1,224.16-mile (1,970.09 km) railway line located in the Mexican Plateau. It connects between Ciudad Juarez in Chihuahua (which close to the Mexico–United States border) and Mexico City. At its northern terminus in Ciudad Juarez, the line directly intercharges with the Union Pacific Railroad and BNSF Railway, where a bridge over the Rio Grande connects to El Paso in Texas. At its southern terminus in Mexico City, the line directly interchanges with Ferrovalle. The line is owned by the Federal government of Mexico and it's operated by Ferromex.

== Usage ==
The line is primarily used by freight trains, including those of Ferromex, CPKC (on the Querétaro–Mexico City section and have also trackage rights between Querétaro and León, Guanajuato), the Línea Coahuila Durango (who has trackage rights between Torreón and Escalón), and Ferrovalle (on the Huehuetoca–Mexico City section)

== History ==
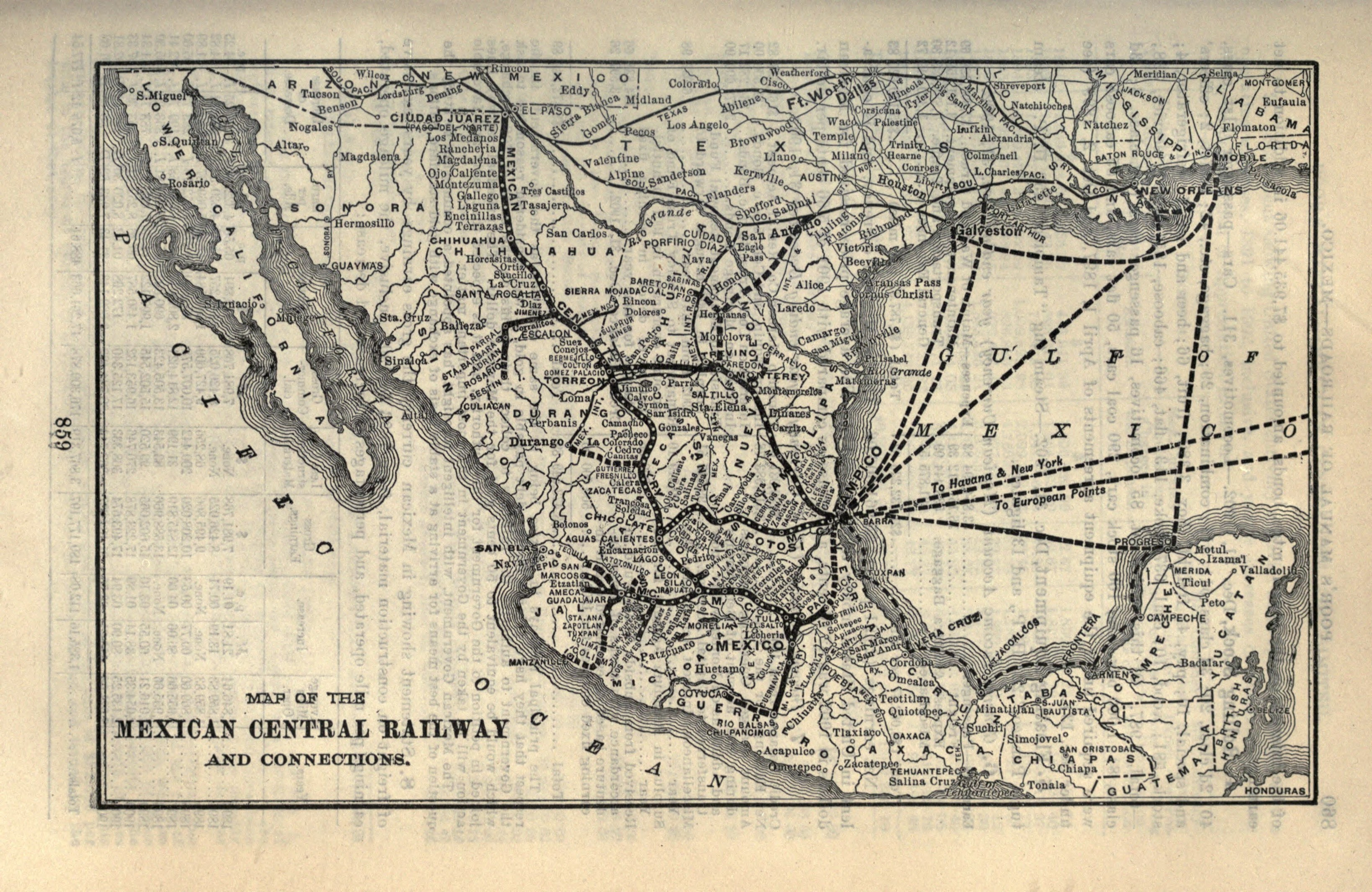
1903 map of the Mexican Central Railway

The line was constructed in 1880 as part of the Mexican Central Railway's main line. The first section between Mexico City and León, Guanajuato was opened in 1882. On August 2, 1882, the line was extended to El Paso and became the first railway line to cross the United States border. Construction of the line was completed, and it officially opened to traffic in March 1884. On February 29, 1908, the line became part of Ferrocarriles Nacionales de México, following the acquisition of Mexican Central Railway.

From 1979 to 1994, the Querétaro–Mexico City section was upgraded into electrified double track railway. The electric train services was inaugurated on February 14, 1994. However, due to privatization of the Ferrocarriles Nacionales de México, the electric service was discontinued in 1996, where gradual closure of the passenger rail operations throughout the country.

As President Ernesto Zedillo privatized the Ferrocarriles Nacionales de México in 1995, Grupo Ferroviario Mexicano, a consortium composed of Grupo México (74%) and Union Pacific Railroad (26%), was awarded the concession of the line with a bid of 3.1527 million pesos in July 1997. The line subsequently became part of Ferromex.

From 2022, the line became one of the routes known as "La Bestia", with thousands of migrants were attempting to ride the trains and putting their own lives at risk to make across the border into the United States. As the string of accidents, Ferromex suspended 60 freight trains in northern routes on September 19, 2023, to protect the safety of migrants.

In September 2025, the railway in Celaya was realigned through the Ferroférico project to avoid passing through the city's urban area. It was formerly known as the diamond crossing with CPKC Line NB. The former right-of-way will be occupied by Querétaro–Irapuato passenger train using elevated tracks.

== Projects ==
=== Querétaro–Irapuato passenger train project ===
The project is implemented by ATTRAPI to rehabilitate and upgrade the signalling system, electrification and double-track railway. The construction began on July 9, 2025, which entails the rehabilitation of 30 km (19 mi) railway between Querétaro and Irapuato. The project is expected to finish in 2027.

== See also ==
- Line T (Ferromex)
- Line B (Kansas City Southern de México)
- El Paso–Juárez
- Ferrocarril Chihuahua al Pacífico
- Rail transport in Mexico
- Mexican Federal Highway 45
