= Mexican International Railroad =

Prenationalization railroad in Mexico

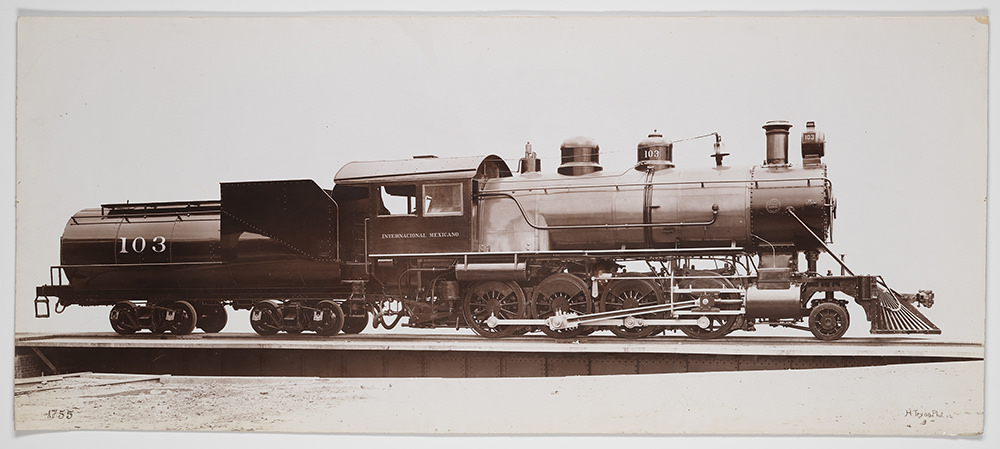
Baldwin locomotive of the railway.

The Mexican International Railroad (Ferrocarril Internacional Mexicano) was one of the primary pre-nationalization railways of Mexico. Incorporated in Connecticut in 1882 in the interests of the Southern Pacific Railroad (SP), it opened a main line from Piedras Negras (across the Rio Grande from Eagle Pass, at the end of an SP branch line) to Torreón, on the Mexican Central Railway, in 1888, and to Durango in October 1892. Branches extended from Durango to Santa Catarina de Tepehuanes and Reata to Monterrey.

The National Railroad of Mexico gained control in 1901 after the death of Collis P. Huntington of the SP, and in June 1910 the government-owned Ferrocarriles Nacionales de México (National Railways of Mexico) took over the property. The line between Sauceda (west of Reata) and Matamoros (east of Torreón) was soon abandoned, as it was parallel to two ex-Mexican Central Railway and National Railroad of Mexico lines. On the other hand, construction of a branch from Allende north to the border at Ciudad Acuña, which had begun in 1911 and been suspended in 1913, was resumed in 1919, with the intent of connecting to a planned (and never-completed) branch of the Kansas City, Mexico and Orient Railway from San Angelo to Del Rio. During the privatization in the 1990s, Ferromex acquired the line between Piedras Negras and Monterrey. The branch to Ciudad Acuña was abandoned and removed. The remaining western piece from Torreón to Durango is part of Línea Coahuila Durango.
