= Mexico City–Querétaro electric passenger train =

Former passenger train in Mexico

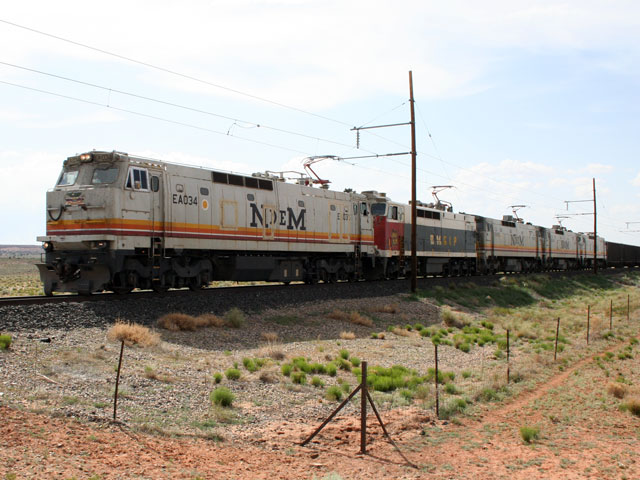
- Locomotives formerly used on the train

Overview
- Service type: Inter-city rail
- Status: Ceased operation
- Locale: Mexican Plateau
- First service: 1994
- Last service: 1996
- Successor: Tren Suburbano (Buenavista–Cuautitlán)
- Former operator: Ferrocarriles Nacionales de México

Route
- Termini: Buenavista station, Mexico City; Querétaro
- Stops: 6

Technical
- Rolling stock: GE E60C-2
- Track gauge: 4 ft 8 1/2 in (1,435 mm) standard gauge
- Electrification: 25 kV 60 Hz AC overhead lines
- Operating speed: Designed: 145 kilometres per hour (90 mph); Actual: 47 kilometres per hour (29 mph)

The Mexico City–Querétaro electric passenger train (Spanish: Tren Eléctrico de Pasajeros México–Querétaro) was a passenger train that provided services in central Mexico. During its 2 years of existence (1994–96), it was operated by Ferrocarriles Nacionales de México.

== History ==
=== Background ===
The oldest antecedents of this railroad date back to the concessions granted by the government of President Porfirio Díaz for the construction of the Mexican Central Railway, which used both American and Mexican capital. The Atchison, Topeka, and Santa Fe Railway provided the American capital, while the federal government of Mexico provided the Mexican capital. The base concession allowed the construction of a line between Mexico City and Ciudad Juárez, which was opened. in 1884. In 1888, a branch was added to the Pacific Ocean via the cities of Guadalajara and Querétaro.

In 1908, at the end of the Porfirian government, the state-owned Ferrocarriles Nacionales de México was created, which constituted the first nationalization of strategically valuable railroads in Mexican history. This nationalization was achieved by expropriating and merging the Mexican Central, National and International railroads, along with other smaller companies. The resulting company controlled 11,117 kilometres (6,908 mi) of nationalized railroads. Between 1910 and 1929, the state of these lines was uncertain, as they fell into the hands of the different groups that fought during the Mexican Revolution.

=== First proposals for electrification ===
The Mexican government's Railroad Development Plan 1973–1986 (Spanish: Plan de Desarrollo Ferrocarrilero de 1973 a 1986) had, among other projects, proposed the construction of an electrified Mexico City-Tijuana double-track railroad for the transport of cargo and passengers. In 1978, the Secretariat of Communications and Transportation planned the construction of the first Mexican double-track electric railroad fed by catenary. Based on a study prepared by that government agency, it was determined that the Mexico City–Querétaro route was the most viable to electrify. due to its high influx of passengers and cargo, almost slopeless topography, and strategic location in the center of the country.

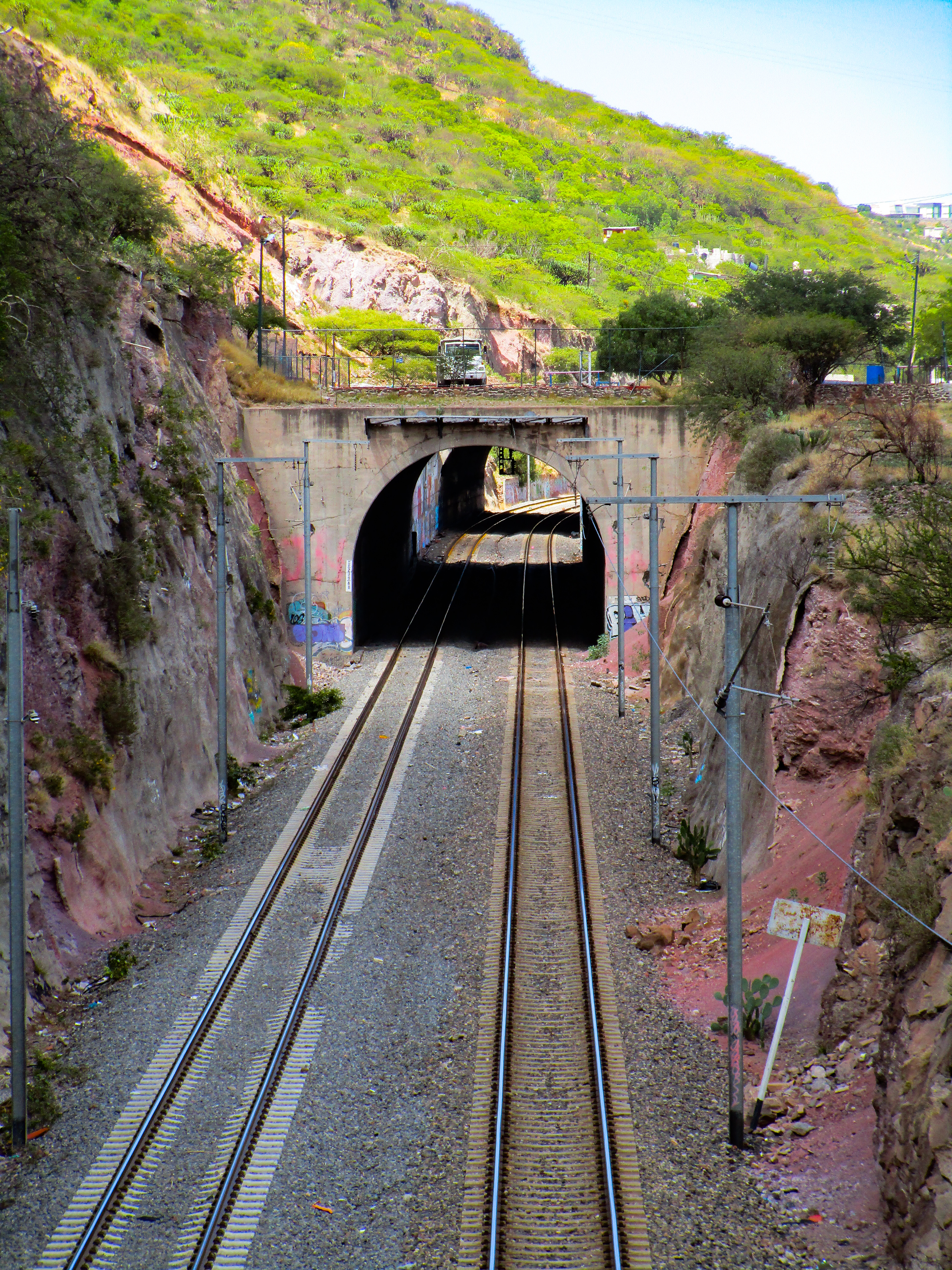
Current situation of the line, as of 2024

In 1979, as part of the construction work, the Mexican government included Japanese, English and French participation in the project. The locomotives used were the GE E60C-2, which were designed and assembled by the GE Transportation company in Aguascalientes between 1980 and 1982.

Around 1983, the Secretariat of Communications and Transportation decided to suspend the project due to changes in the layout of the routes and the operating policies. In 1986, electrification was restarted only with the participation of technical staff from the Secretariat of Communications and Transportation, Ferrocarriles Nacionales de México, and the French Société Francais d'Etudes et de Réalisations Ferroviaires.

During the construction of the track that lasted from 1983 to 1994, the construction of a railway like the Shinkansen on the same right-of-way was considered in 1987, but the lack of funds made it unfeasible. For this reason, the construction of the electrified tracks for mixed service continued.

=== Operation ===
On 14 February 1994, regular electric trips between the Buenavista station in Mexico City and Querétaro began. The service only lasted until 1996 with a poor result, because the electric locomotives could not run at full speed, since they had to share the tracks with diesel-electric locomotives. The restriction of the E60C-2s to serve only on this line made them unaffordable.

=== End of operations ===
In 1996, President Ernesto Zedillo disincorporated the state-owned company Ferrocarriles Nacionales de México, and passenger transport operations throughout most of the country were terminated.

After the railroad network was privatized again in 1997, Transportación Ferroviaria Mexicana decided to sell the 39 GE E60C-2 locomotives to American companies, ending the use of electrified track, leaving the electrified catenary lines for supposed use in the future. 22 of the locomotives were traded back to GE Transportation in exchange for GE AC4400CW diesel locomotives. Three of those were then sold to Texas Utilities for use on electrified freight trains. Meanwhile, the TFM sold 6 more E60C-2s to the Black Mesa and Lake Powell Railroad.

== Later use of electric infrastructure ==
Some of the overhead lines on this line would later be reused for the Tren Suburbano, an electrified commuter train between Mexico City's new Buenavista railway station and Cuautitlán.

== See also ==
- Rail transport in Mexico
- Ferrocarriles Nacionales de México

== Sources ==
- Harbour, Mike (July 1999). "New spur, more electrics on tap for Texas utility". Trains. 59 (7): 19–22. ISSN 0041-0934.
- Middleton, William D. (2001) [1974]. When the Steam Railroads Electrified (2nd ed.). Bloomington, Indiana: Indiana University Press. ISBN 978-0-253-33979-9. OL 2510988W.
