= Patrick J. Ottensmeyer International Railway Bridge =

Patrick J. Ottensmeyer International Bridge
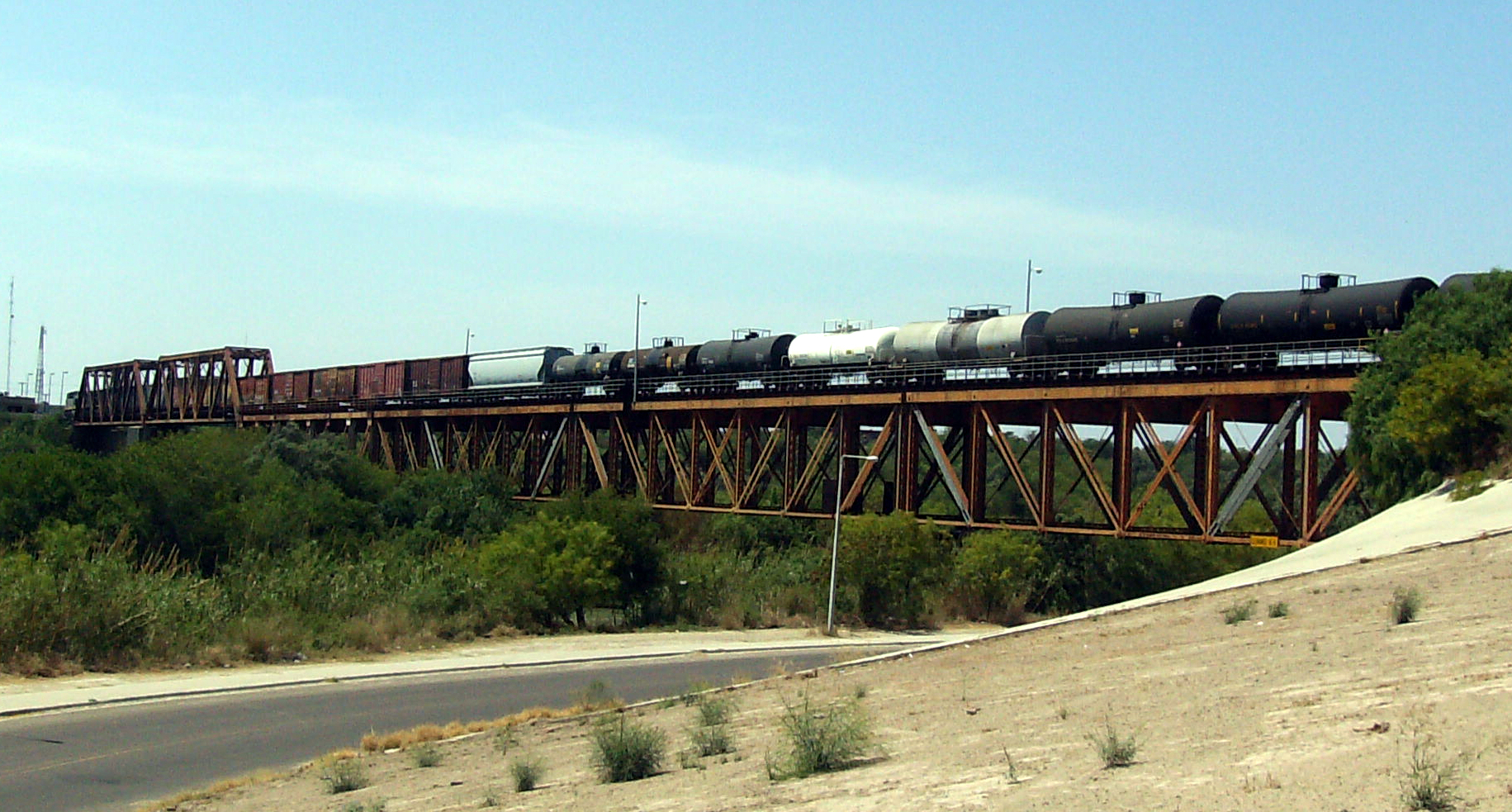
- Train crossing the Patrick J. Ottensmeyer International Railway Bridge, as seen from the U.S.
- Coordinates: 27°29′55″N 99°30′59″W
- Carries: Trains
- Crosses: Rio Grande/Mexico–United States border
- Locale: Laredo, Texas/Nuevo Laredo
- Other name(s): Laredo International Railway Bridge; Puente Negro
- Owner: CPKC
- Next upstream: World Trade International Bridge
- Next downstream: Gateway to the Americas International Bridge

Characteristics
- Design: Truss bridge
- Material: Steel
- Pier construction: Concrete
- Total length: 1,275 ft (389 m)
- Width: 18 ft (5.5 m)
- Capacity: 60 to 80 trains per day

Rail characteristics
- No. of tracks: 2
- Track gauge: 4 ft 8 1/2 in (1,435 mm) standard gauge

History
- Opened: 1920 (first bridge); 2025 (second bridge)

The Patrick J. Ottensmeyer International Bridge (until 2025 it was known as the Texas Mexican Railway International Bridge) is an international railway bridge across the Rio Grande and U.S.-Mexico border between Laredo, Texas, and Nuevo Laredo, Tamaulipas, the only rail link between these cities. Owned and operated by CPKC, the single-track bridge is the busiest rail border crossing in North America. It is also known as the Laredo International Railway Bridge and Puente Negro (The Black Bridge).

== History ==
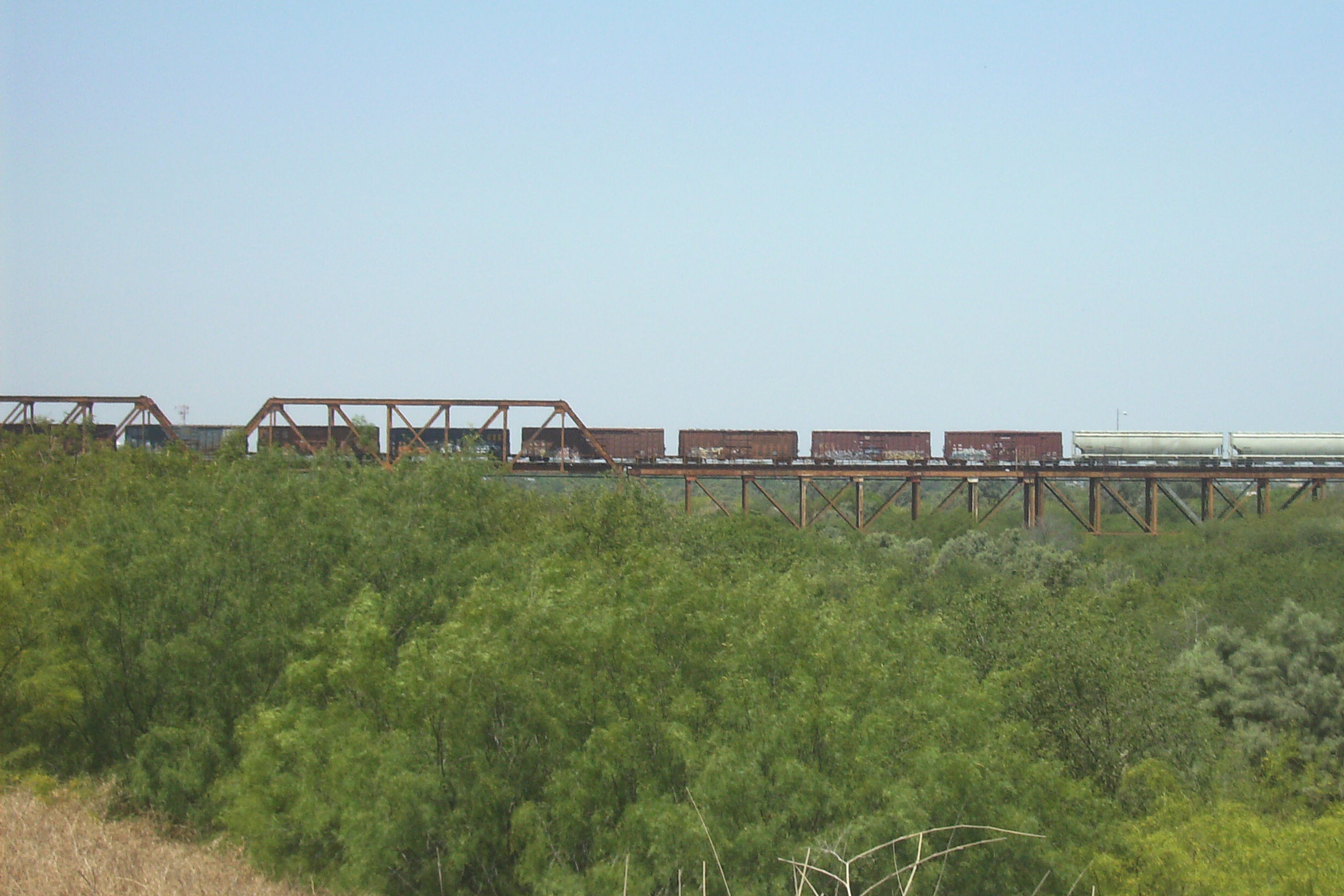
View of the bridge from Nuevo Laredo

The bridge opened in 1920. The approach to the bridge on the side of the United States was controlled by the Texas Mexican Railway (Tex Mex), which had been owned by the Mexican Government since the turn of the century. The approach to the bridge on the Mexican side would also come to be fully owned by the when all railroads were nationalized under Ferrocarriles Nacionales de México (N de M, English: Mexican National Railways) in the late 1930s.

Tex Mex was sold to Transportación Maritima Mexicana (TMM) in 1982. In 1996, the Mexican Government privatized N de M, and sold the Northeast Railroad leading to the bridge to Transportación Ferroviaria Mexicana (TFM), a joint venture between TMM and Kansas City Southern (KCS). At that same time, TMM sold 49 percent of Tex Mex to KCM, making both sides of the bridge a joint venture.

KCS bought out TMM in 2005, integrating Tex Mex into its Kansas City Southern Railway and turning TFM into Kansas City Southern de México, giving the railroad full control of a route between the midwestern United States and a large portion of Mexico.

Canadian Pacific Railway purchased KCS in December 2021 for US$31 billion. On April 14, 2023, the railroads merged to form CPKC, the first and only to directly serve Canada, Mexico and the United States. One of the major arguments for the merger was that it would increase competition in the Chicago–Mexico corridor that had been dominated by Union Pacific and BNSF Railway.

The bridge is the busiest rail border crossing in North America. As of 2022, the bridge was operating at its maximum capacity of 26 trains per day. Further growth was limited by the need for customs and safety inspections at the crossing. On October 31, 2022, KCS broke ground on a second parallel bridge, which more than doubled the capacity of the crossing, allowing each bridge to be focused on a single direction of traffic. The new bridge is named after KCS's long-remembered CEO and President, who pushed for its construction prior to the merger with CP. He died in July 2024, and CPKC's directors decided to name both bridges the "Patrick J. Ottensmeyer International Railway Bridge" after him. The second bridge was opened to traffic in February 2025, ending the bottleneck.

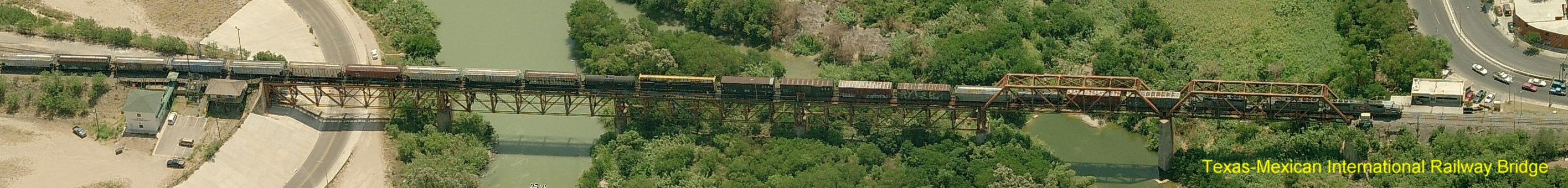
The full length of the Patrick J. Ottensmeyer International Railway Bridge.

== See also ==
- List of international bridges in North America
