= National Railroad of Mexico =

Major pre-nationalization railway of Mexico

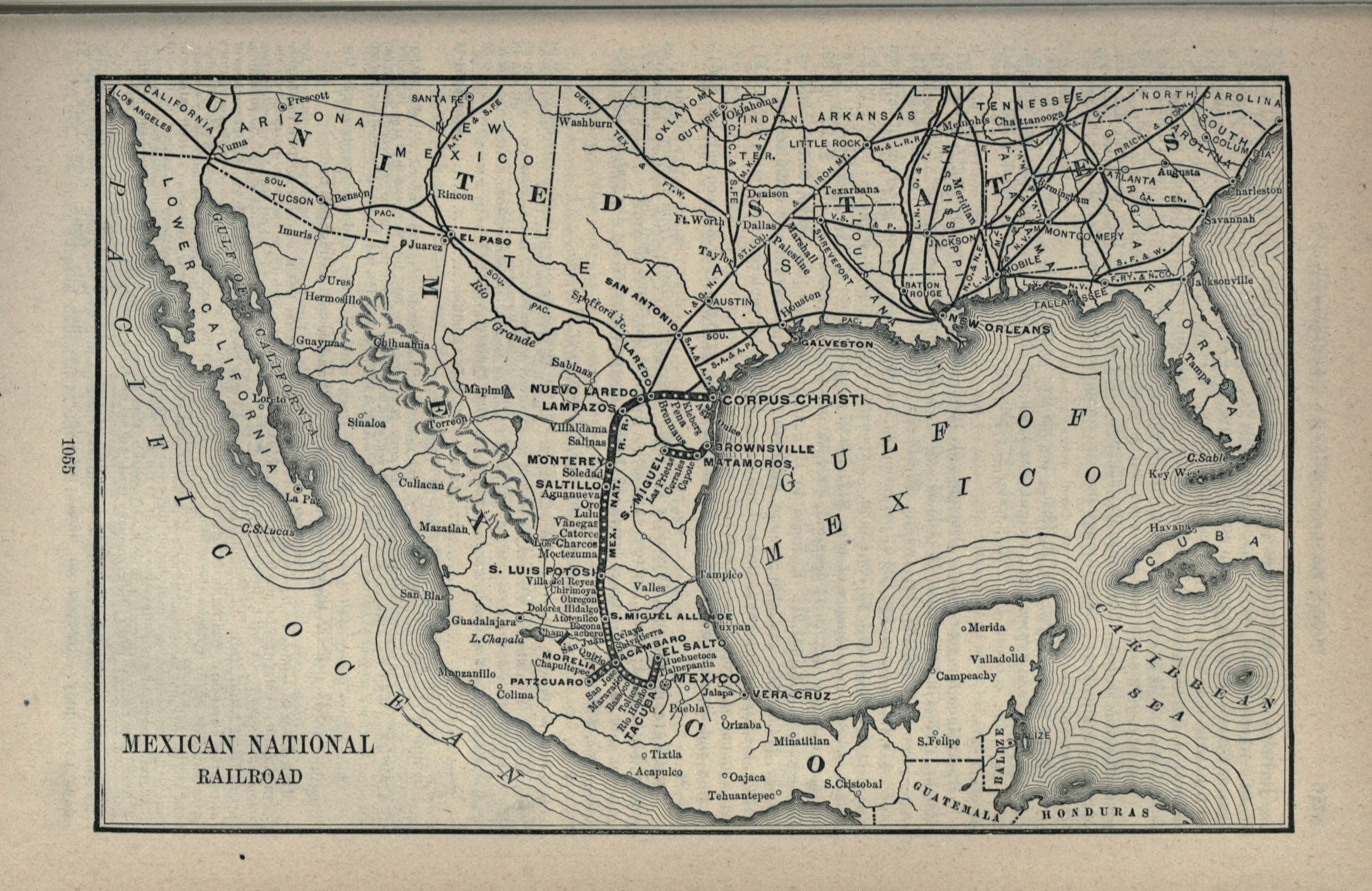
Poor's 1891 map of the system

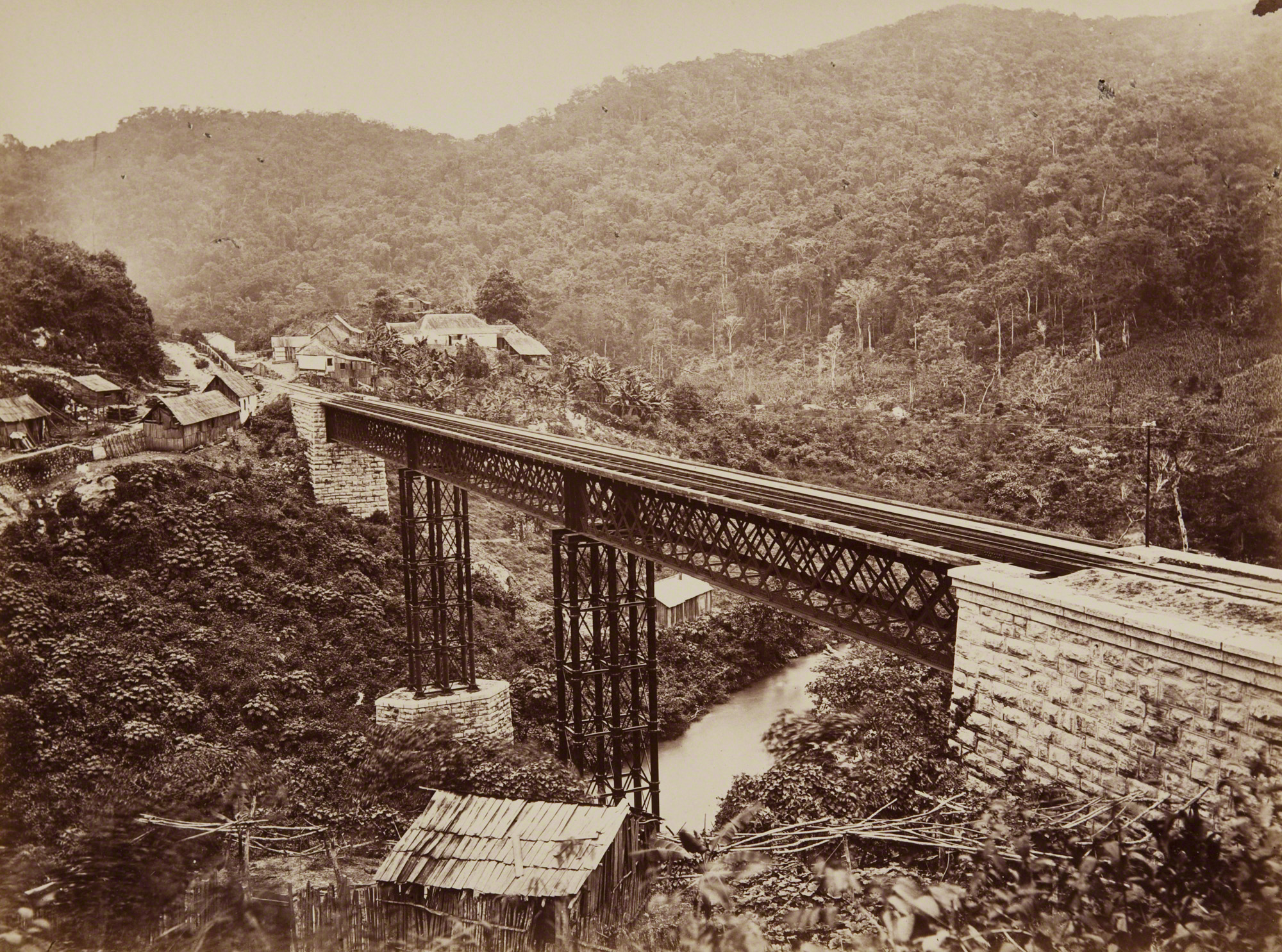
FNM Bridge over Rio Balsas, 1883.

The National Railroad of Mexico (Ferrocarril Nacional de México) was one of the primary pre-nationalization railways of Mexico. Incorporated in Colorado in 1880 as the Mexican National Railway (Ferrocarril Nacional Mexicano), and headed by General William Jackson Palmer of the Denver and Rio Grande Railway, it completed a 3 ft (914 mm) narrow gauge main line from Mexico City to Nuevo Laredo in September 1888 after an 1887 reorganization as the Mexican National Railroad. At its north end, the Texas Mexican Railway, owned since 1883, ran east from Laredo to the Gulf of Mexico at Corpus Christi; a second Gulf connection was completed in 1905 through a branch from Monterrey to Matamoros. Other branches included a cut-off from Mexico City through Querétaro to Celaya and an incomplete Pacific extension from Acámbaro to Uruapan. (Another piece of the latter, from Colima to Manzanillo, remained with the Mexican National Construction Company, and was acquired by the Mexican Central Railway in 1905.) In 1886 the railway commissioned Abel Briquet to take a series of photographs, which provide documentation of the railways at that time.

== After reorganisation in 1902 ==
The company was reincorporated again in Utah in February 1902 as the National Railroad of Mexico, and completed standard-gauging the main line in November 1903. The National subsequently acquired three narrow gauge companies in central Mexico. First it leased the Michoacán and Pacific Railway in 1900, giving it branches from Maravatio to Zitácuaro and Angangueo. In 1903 it acquired the Interoceanic Railway of Mexico, which included a main line from Mexico City to Veracruz and a number of branches, in exchange for the Mexican government gaining control of the National. Finally, in 1906, the Hidalgo and Northeastern Railroad, from Mexico City northeast to Tortugas, Pachuca, and Irolo, became part of the National Railroad of Mexico's system.

Six years after the government gained control, the properties of the National and Hidalgo and Northeastern were transferred to the Ferrocarriles Nacionales de México (National Railways of Mexico) in January 1909. (The Michoacán and Pacific, Interoceanic, and the latter's subsidiaries remained separate companies.) Following privatization for freight service in the 1990s, the old National Railroad of Mexico, including most of the Interoceanic, formed the majority of Transportación Ferroviaria Mexicana (now Kansas City Southern de México).
