= Línea Coahuila Durango =

Company

Overview
- Reporting mark: LFCD
- Locale: Durango & Coahuila
- Dates of operation: 1998–
- Predecessor: N de M

Technical
- Track gauge: 4 ft 8 1/2 in (1,435 mm) standard gauge
- Length: 1,371 kilometres (852 mi)

LFCD is also the ICAO code for Andernos-les-Bains airfield in France.

The Línea Coahuila Durango (reporting mark LFCD) is a short-line railroad company operating between the states of Durango and Coahuila in Mexico. It was created as a freight railroad company when the Ferrocarriles Nacionales de Mexico was privatized between 1997 and 1998. It started operations on 27 April 1998. The concession to run the company was purchased by a joint venture including Altos Hornos de Mexico and Peñoles. Control of the company is now in the hands of Industrias Peñoles.

== See also ==
- List of Mexican railroads
