= Sauceda =

Sauceda is a surname. Notable people with the surname include:

- Gregorio Sauceda-Gamboa (born c. 1965), Mexican drug trafficker
- Héctor Manuel Sauceda Gamboa (died 2009), Mexican drug trafficker
- Sunny Sauceda, American musician
- Sergio Sauceda (born 1973), Mexican track and field athlete
