= Texas Mexican Railway =

Railroad that operated as a subsidiary of the Kansas City Southern Railway

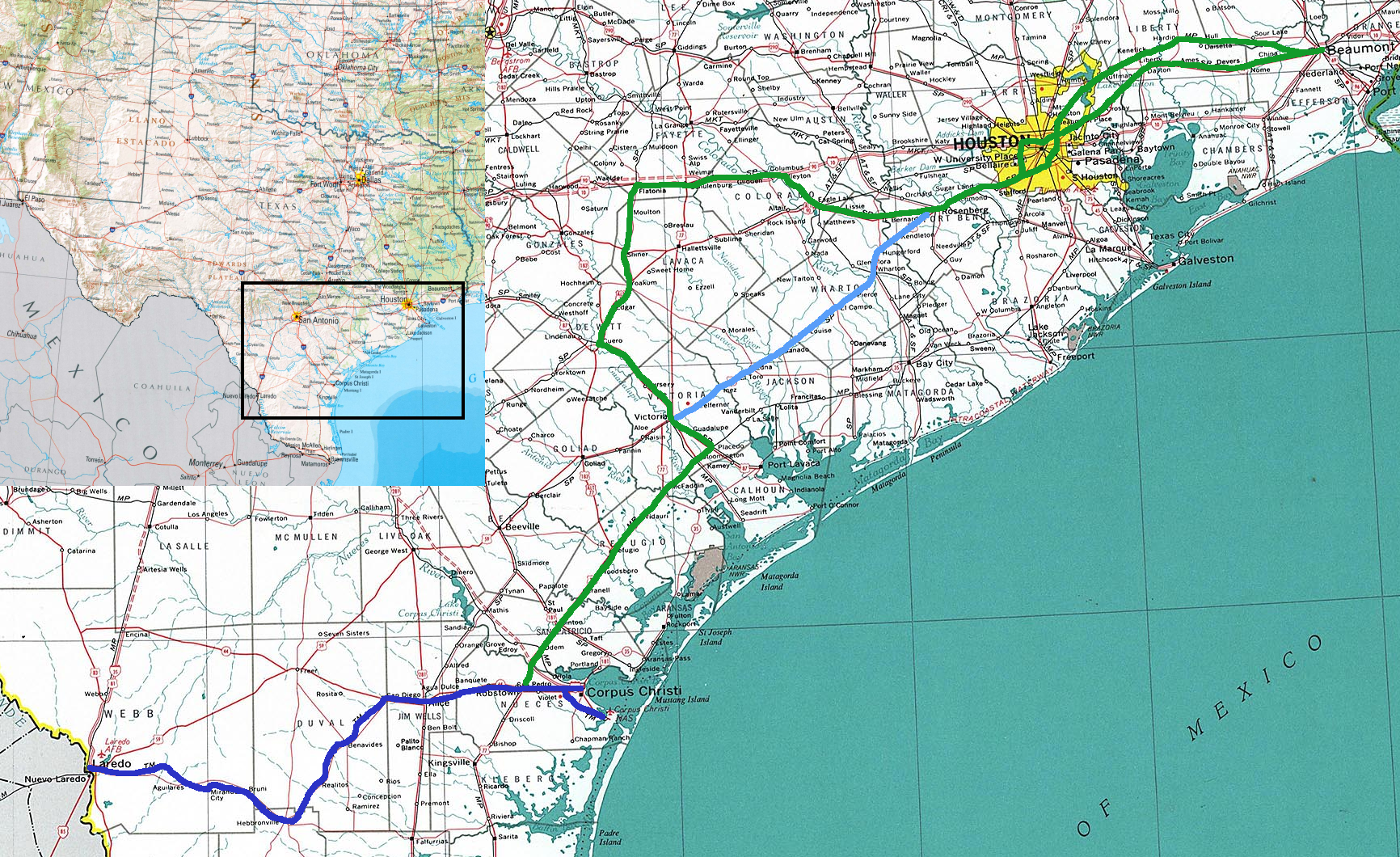
- The route of the Texas Mexican Railroad is shown in dark blue, trackage rights in UP Beaumont, Houston, Glidden, Cuero, Angleton and Brownsville Subdivisions in green, and the Macaroni Line in light blue

Overview
- Reporting mark: TM
- Locale: Texas
- Dates of operation: 1875–2005
- Successor: Kansas City Southern Railway, currently Canadian Pacific Kansas City.

Technical
- Track gauge: 4 ft 8 1/2 in (1,435 mm) standard gauge
- Previous gauge: 3 ft (914 mm) narrow gauge

The Texas Mexican Railway (reporting mark TM) was a short line railroad in the U.S. state of Texas operating between Corpus Christi and the Texas Mexican Railway International Bridge in Laredo, Texas. It is often referred to as the Tex Mex, or Tex Mex Railway.

The railroad traces its roots back to the Corpus Christi, San Diego and Rio Grande Gauge Railroad, a narrow-gauge railroad established in 1875. In 1883, the line was extended over the Rio Grande and the Mexico–United States border. The railroad was purchased by the Mexican government in 1900, which controlled the railroad until 1982 when it was sold to Transportación Maritima Mexicana (TMM). In 1996, Kansas City Southern (KCS) became a 49% owner of the railroad, as part of a larger business deal. KCS bought out TMM in 2005 and made Tex-Mex a wholly owned and consolidated subsidiary of its Kansas City Southern Railway.

Canadian Pacific Railway purchased KCS in December 2021 for US$31 billion. On April 14, 2023, the railroads merged to form Canadian Pacific Kansas City (CPKC). Lines originally operated by Tex-Mex are now a vital link in CPKC's rail network, the first and only to directly serve Canada, Mexico and the United States. One of the major arguments for the merger was that it would increase competition in the Chicago–Mexico corridor that had been dominated by Union Pacific and BNSF Railway.

== History ==
=== 19th century ===
Chartered in March 1875, the Corpus Christi, San Diego and Rio Grande Gauge Railroad built a 3 ft (914 mm) narrow-gauge line from Corpus Christi, Texas to Rancho Banquete, Texas between 1875 and 1877, and then on to San Diego, Texas by 1879. This 52-mile (84 km) line's main purpose was to take domestic sheep from Texas ranches to the shores of the Gulf of Mexico, and received some funding from Richard King and Mifflin Kenedy. In 1881, the line was sold to a syndicate that included William J. Palmer and it was given a new charter as the Texas Mexican Railway. Under this document, the line was built an additional 110 miles (180 km) to Laredo, Texas. While the charter also allowed for other lines which would have made a 1,400-mile (2,300 km) network, including one line from San Diego to the Sabine River with branch lines to Tyler, Galveston, San Antonio, Texas, and Sabine Pass, these expansions were never constructed. The small Galveston, Brazos and Colorado Railroad was purchased in 1881 for a connection to Galveston, but a line was never built between the two railroads.

In 1883 a bridge was built across the Rio Grande to Nuevo Laredo, making the Tex-Mex the first Mexico–United States rail connection. This granted rail access for all of Northern Mexico to the Port of Corpus Christi, devastating international commerce in Brownsville in the lower Rio Grande Valley, and its deep water port, Los Brazos de Santiago. This rail connection also devastated the commercial navigation of the Rio Grande, between Rio Grande City, Camargo (Mexico), Brownsville, and Los Brazos de Santiago, located adjacent to the mouth of the Rio Grande.

It was not until 1889 that the North American rail system connected Mexico with Canada. In 1910 an international rail bridge was completed in Brownsville, Texas and Matamoros, Tamaulipas, which is currently owned and operated by the Brownsville and Matamoros Bridge Company and operates as the Brownsville & Matamoros International Bridge, a joint venture of the Union Pacific and the Mexican government.

=== 20th century ===
The Mexican government controlled the Tex-Mex from 1900 to 1982, when privatization made it part of Grupo TFM. The railway became 4 ft 8 1/2 in (1,435 mm) standard gauge on July 17, 1902. In 1906 it bought the Texas Mexican Northern Railway, and in 1930, the San Diego and Gulf Railway. They also began operating a 19-mile (31 km) US government railroad from Corpus Christi to a naval air station in 1940.

Ordered on April 22, 1938, seven Whitcomb Locomotive Works diesel locomotives were delivered between August and November of 1939. While some steam locomotives were kept until 1946 or 1947, they were almost never used, and the Tex-Mex is considered to be the first railway in the world to dieselize.

The railway briefly resumed passenger service from January 31, 1986, to June 18, 1989, with the Tex-Mex Express. The seasonal train ran on a 157-mile (253 km) route between Corpus Christi and Laredo with stops in Robstown, Alice, and Hebbronville, taking 4.5 hours. One daily round trip operated on Fridays, Saturdays, and Sundays during the spring and summer.

In 1995, led by the vision of CEO and President Michael Haverty to connect the Chicago corridor directly to Mexico, and for the regional KCS to become a large international railroad, the company acquired a 49% stake in the Tex-Mex directly from the Mexican Government. At the time, the investment was considered questionable by some observers, because TM had no connection to KCSR. The solution would not come until 1996: as a result of the proposed merger between Union Pacific and Southern Pacific, KCS/TM made certain demands of the Surface Transportation Board for approval of the agreement. KCS/TM wanted trackage rights to enable it to connect the 380 mile distance from: Laredo, Texas, the crossing point of the TM into the United States; to Beaumont, Texas, the southern end junction of the KCS's route to Port Arthur, Texas. KCS/TM further requested the right to buy the virtually abandoned 91 miles of the SP "Macaroni Line", from Rosenberg to Victoria.

In 1996, Kansas City Southern Industries won a Mexican government concession to operate the "Northeast Railroad," a potentially profitable 5,335-kilometer rail system connecting key cities and ports. This line, which carried a significant portion of Mexico's rail traffic and freight from the United States, was highly sought after due to its strategic location, including proximity to numerous auto assembly plants. The concession was operated by a new company known as Transportación Ferroviaria Mexicana (TFM), which was a joint venture of KCSI with Transportación Maritima Mexicana (TMM). In 2005, TMM sold its share of TFM to KCSI, prompting a rename to Kansas City Southern de México (KCSM).

Responding to increased international trade between the US and Mexico, the railroad built a large railroad yard and intermodal freight transport facility at Laredo in 1998. They also won Regional Railroad of the Year that same year.

In August 2004, KCS again purchased a controlling interest in Tex-Mex.

The Macaroni line laid dormant and unused for 11 years until 2006, when KCS/TM announced that they would rebuild the line to Class 1 standards, to avoid running on a circuitous UP monopolised route which required running for 120 kilometers of the Glidden Subdivision from Houston to Flatonia, along with an additional 90 miles through Cuero Sub from Flatonia to Placedo and Bloomington, where they KCS trains enter UP Angleton/Brownsville Subs, heading to Robstown, Texas. Construction began in January 2009 and the line opened for the first trains for over 20 years, by June 2009. The line now operates daily trains, has CTC signaling, and an intermodal facility at Kendleton, Texas.

=== 21st century ===
In 2002, however, both companies sold their shares to Grupo Transportación Ferroviaria Mexicana. In August 2004, KCS again purchased a controlling interest in Tex-Mex, although they were held by a trust company until the Surface Transportation Board approved the move for January 2005.

In 1996 Tex-Mex bought a 90 miles segment of unused/abandoned Southern Pacific trackage from Rosenberg to Victoria, TX. The line was dormant and unused by the TM until 2006 when they announced they would rebuild the line to avoid continued running on a circuitous Union Pacific route from Houston to Flatonia (UP Glidden Subdivision) and from there to Placedo and Bloomington (UP Cuero Subdivision), where they KCS trains enter UP Angleton/Brownsville Subdivisions, heading to Robstown. In June 2009, Tex-Mex began operating on new trackage between Victoria and Rosenberg, Texas, known as the Macaroni Line. The line was built in 1882 and was called the Macaroni Line because the main food for the workers constructing the line was macaroni. In 1885, it was acquired by Southern Pacific, which operated the 91-mile line until 1985: by the early 1990s, the tracks were mostly worn out. In 2006, KCS and Tex-Mex announced they would rebuild the Macaroni Line, to end the need for trackage rights on a circuitous Union Pacific route. Construction began in January 2009 and the line opened for the first trains for over 20 years, by June 2009. The line now operates daily trains and has CTC signaling.

On May 23, 2018, the Tex-Mex announced they were moving the point of interchange where the railroad met Kansas City Southern de Mexico (KCSM). For many years the interchange took place on the bridge connecting Mexico and the United States at Laredo, Texas where Mexican crews and American crews would change out. American crews working for Tex-Mex did not operate in Mexico and Mexican crews working for KCSM did not operate in the U.S. The Federal Railroad Administration (FRA) approved the Tex-Mex's request to allow Mexican crews to cross the border with their trains and operate 9 miles into the U.S. to the North Laredo switching yard. The Carrier asserted that this would relieve the congestion and road blockages by the long freight trains, which lasted for hours in Nuevo Laredo and in Laredo since the trains would no longer have to change crews on the border bridge. The Brotherhood of Locomotive Engineers & Trainmen (BLET) objected to the use of Mexican crews in the United States and threatened to strike over the matter. U.S. District Court Judge Diana Saldana enjoined the BLET from striking and ordered the parties to arbitrate the matter before an arbitrator. The arbitrator ruled on July 19, 2020, that the bargaining contracts between the Tex-Mex Railway and the BLET allowed the railroad the exclusive right to determine where the point of interchange would be. He noted that the FRA's decision to allow Mexican crews to operate into the United States was not before him, because that matter had previously been decided by the FRA and was not a part of the BLET's grievance.

Preceded by Red River Valley and Western Railroad	Regional Railroad of the Year; 1998	Succeeded by Providence and Worcester Railroad
