= Ferrovalle =

Ferrocarril y Terminal del Valle de México
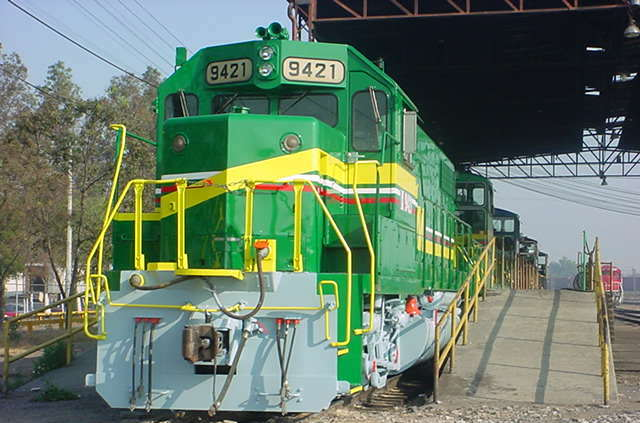
- Ferrovalle 9421 a EMD GP38-2 locomotive

Overview
- Headquarters: Mexico City
- Locale: Mexico City
- Dates of operation: 1998–
- Predecessor: N de M

Technical
- Track gauge: 1,435 mm (4 ft 8 1/2 in)
- Length: 824 kilometres (512 mi)

Other
- Website: www.ferrovalle.com.mx

The Ferrocarril y Terminal del Valle de México (Ferrovalle) is a company that operates railroads and terminals in and around Mexico City, the capital of Mexico. It is jointly owned by Canadian Pacific Kansas City (25%), Ferromex and Ferrosur.

Locomotives

As of today the FTVM has different locomotives from EMD and GE

- 9 EMD SW1504s
- 9 GE B23-7s
- 3 EMD GP38-2s (These are FTVMs newest locomotives)
- 6 EMD MP15ACs
- 5 GE C30-7s

== See also ==
- List of Mexican railroads
