= Canadian Pacific Kansas City =

Canadian railroad holding company

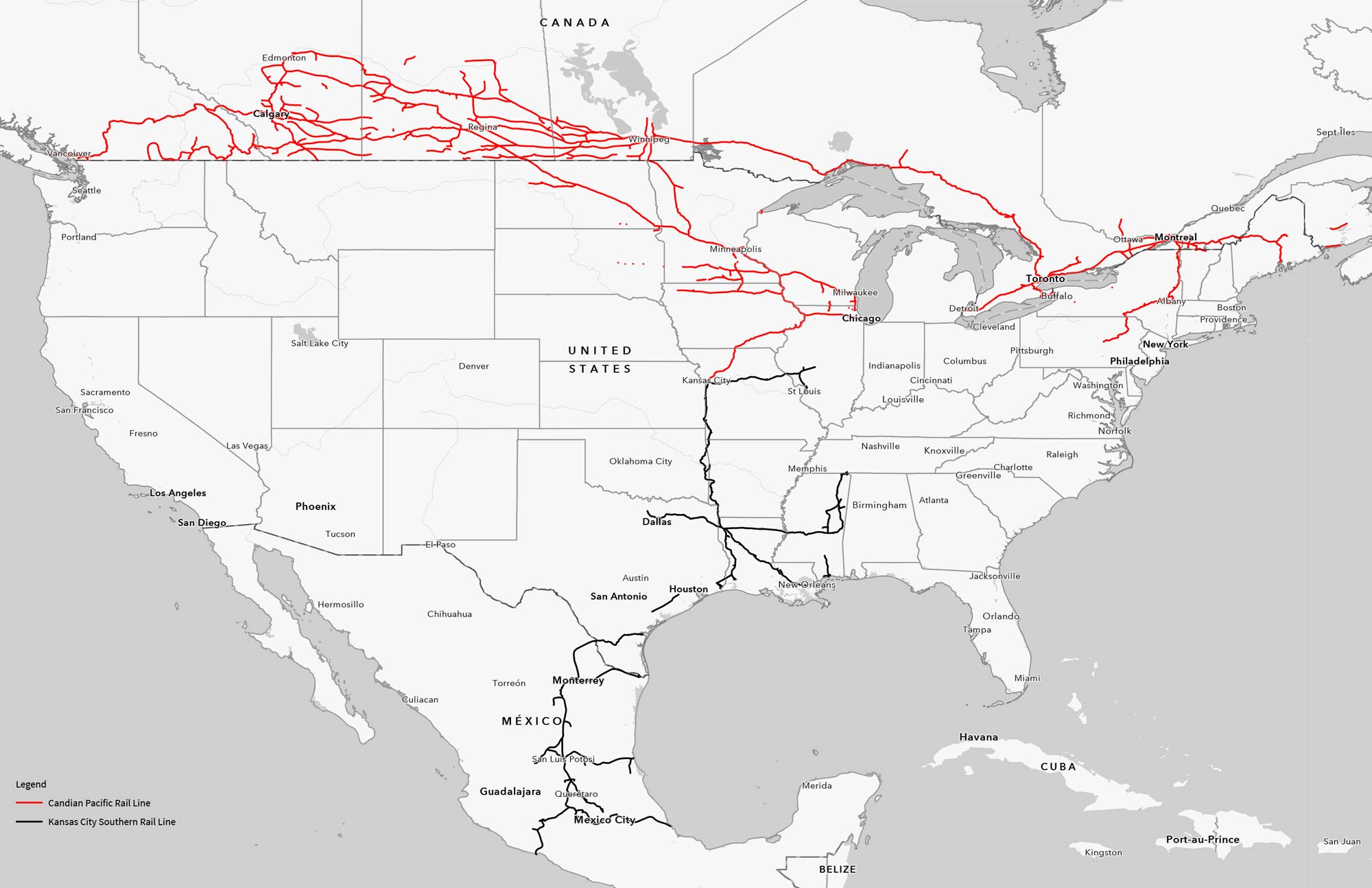
- CPKC system map, showing CP tracks in red and KCS in black. Does not include trackage rights.

Overview
- Locale: Canada; Mexico; United States
- Dates of operation: 2023–present

Technical
- Track gauge: 1,435 mm (4 ft 8 1/2 in) standard gauge
- Length: 32,000 km (20,000 mi)

Other
- Website: cpkcr.com

Canadian Pacific Kansas City Limited
- The CPKC shield, featuring a beaver and maple leaf, both national symbols of Canada. The initials of the three subsidiary railroads are also visible.
- Trade name: CPKC
- Type: Public
- Traded as: TSX: CP; NYSE: CP; S&P/TSX 60 component
- Industry: Rail transport
- Founded: April 14, 2023; 3 years ago
- Headquarters: Calgary, Alberta, Canada
- Areas served: Canada; Mexico; United States
- Key people: Keith Creel (President and CEO); Gordon Trafton (Chair)
- Revenue: ▲ C$15.1 billion (2025)
- Net income: ▲ C$4.14 billion (2025)
- Number of employees: 20,000
- Subsidiaries: Canadian Pacific Railway; Kansas City Southern Railway; Kansas City Southern de México

Canadian Pacific Kansas City Limited (known as Canadian Pacific Railway Limited until 2023), doing business as CPKC, is a Canadian railway holding company headquartered in Calgary. Through its operating subsidiaries, including the Canadian Pacific Railway, Kansas City Southern Railway, and Kansas City Southern de Mexico, it operates about 32,000 kilometres (20,000 mi) of rail in Canada, Mexico, and the United States.

== History ==
=== Predecessors and formation ===
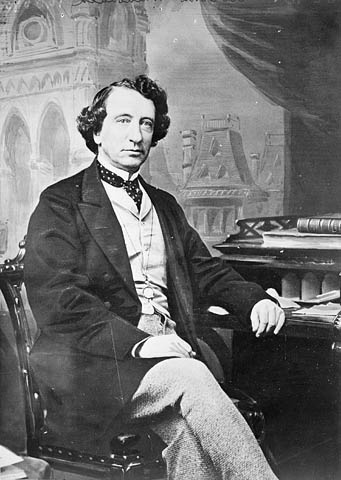
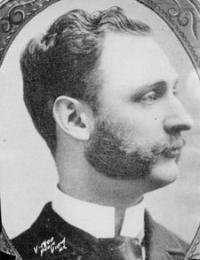
John A. Macdonald, founder of CP, and Arthur Stilwell, founder of KCS, the two main predecessor railroads of CPKC

Canadian Pacific Railway (CP) announced on March 21, 2021, that it was planning to purchase Kansas City Southern (KCS) for US$29 billion.

Thirty days later, Canadian National Railway (CN) issued a competing offer of $33.7 billion. But in August, the US Surface Transportation Board (STB) blocked the CN deal, ruling that the company could not use a voting trust to assume control of KCS because it might reduce competition in the railroad industry.

On September 12, 2021, KCS accepted a new $31 billion offer from CP and terminated its agreement with CN. KCS's shareholders voted to approve the merger on December 10, 2021. The STB had already ruled that CP's plan to use a voting trust to take control of KCS would not hamper competition. The voting trust allowed CP to become the beneficial owner of KCS in December 2021, but the two railroads operated independently until receiving approval for a merger of operations from the STB. CP President and CEO Keith Creel, who became CEO of the merged company, chose the name of the new company as a way to honor the long and rich history of the two main predecessor companies. Creel also announced that if the STB approved the merger of CP with KCS, it would be celebrated with a historic tour from Calgary to Mexico City led by the iconic steam locomotive CPR #2816, The Empress.

Union Pacific and BNSF Railway raised objections with the STB about the merger. Both companies were concerned about CPKC's projected traffic increases and warned that they could cause congestion on UP-owned tracks through the Houston area (Houston, West Belt, East Belt, Beaumont, Harrisburg and Glidden Subdivisions), where UP and BNSF operate a large amount of daily traffic. (BNSF operates in the Houston area through a combination of owned tracks and trackage and haulage rights on UP tracks.) CPKC relies on UP trackage rights between Beaumont and Rosenberg, and between Victoria and Robstown to move its trains from Beaumont to the Mexican border at Laredo; that includes crossing Houston, where KCS and CPKC trains have experienced significant delays due to the heavy traffic that UP and BNSF operate in the Terminal. Creel, who has maintained important working relationships with UP, stated that he would spend time in Houston to learn about operations throughout the area and collaborate with UP to come up with a solution to the recurring problem of traffic congestion.

At the STB hearings, CP and KCS defended their merger proposal, arguing that Houston has sufficient capacity to support the projected increases in traffic. Creel, for example, argued that the receiving and departure tracks located at the west end of Englewood Yard, UP's main yard in Houston, could be lengthened to accommodate longer trains. UP responded to CP's arguments, saying that although they have a proposal to expand the yard, they could not proceed until existing environmental issues were resolved, stemming from creosote contamination that has affected the area surrounding Englewood (Southern Pacific for decades operated a facility at Englewood to treat railroad ties with creosote, and accidental spills of this substance caused severe contamination of the soil beneath the neighborhoods around the yard; UP is currently working with the City of Houston and the Environmental Protection Agency (EPA) on a remediation plan for the existing contamination in the area.)

To mediate between the disputing parties, the Board suggested that (pending merger approval or post-merger) KCS or CPKC might apply to UP for trackage rights from Texarkana to Laredo via San Antonio and Austin to reroute part of the north-south traffic, bypassing Houston.

The two companies demanded that CPKC perform construction work on new sidings on both the lines that meet in the Houston area and on Brownsville Subdivision between Placedo and Robstown, near Corpus Christi, where CPKC trains leave the UP tracks in South Texas.

Metra also opposed the merger, arguing that the projected increase in traffic would delay its passenger trains. A group of west-suburban Chicago communities (DuPage County, Bartlett, Bensenville, Elgin, Itasca, Hanover Park, Roselle, Wood Dale and Schaumburg) on the Milwaukee District West Line said the merger would reduce quality of life and slow economic development in their communities.

In STB hearings, Canadian National, which had already lost KCS to CP, presented a plan to acquire a KCS line—the former Gateway Western, which linked Kansas City to Springfield, Illinois; St. Louis, Missouri; and East St. Louis, Illinois—tie it to its former Illinois Central Gilman Subdivision, and thus create via both Springfield and via St. Louis a new corridor between Kansas City, Michigan, and eastern Canada. This would bypass Chicago, and, according to the plan presented by CN, divert 80,000 long-haul truck shipments to rail annually. The plan included the improvement of the corridor, valued at more than US$250 million. A few months later, CN ended its effort to purchase the Springfield Line to try to obtain trackage rights on the line, always with the same intention of creating the corridor proposed in the original plan to purchase the line filed with the STB. The STB rejected CN's plans to operate on the Springfield Line.

Despite the objections, the merger between CP and KCS received final approval on March 15, 2023, and was completed on April 14, 2023.

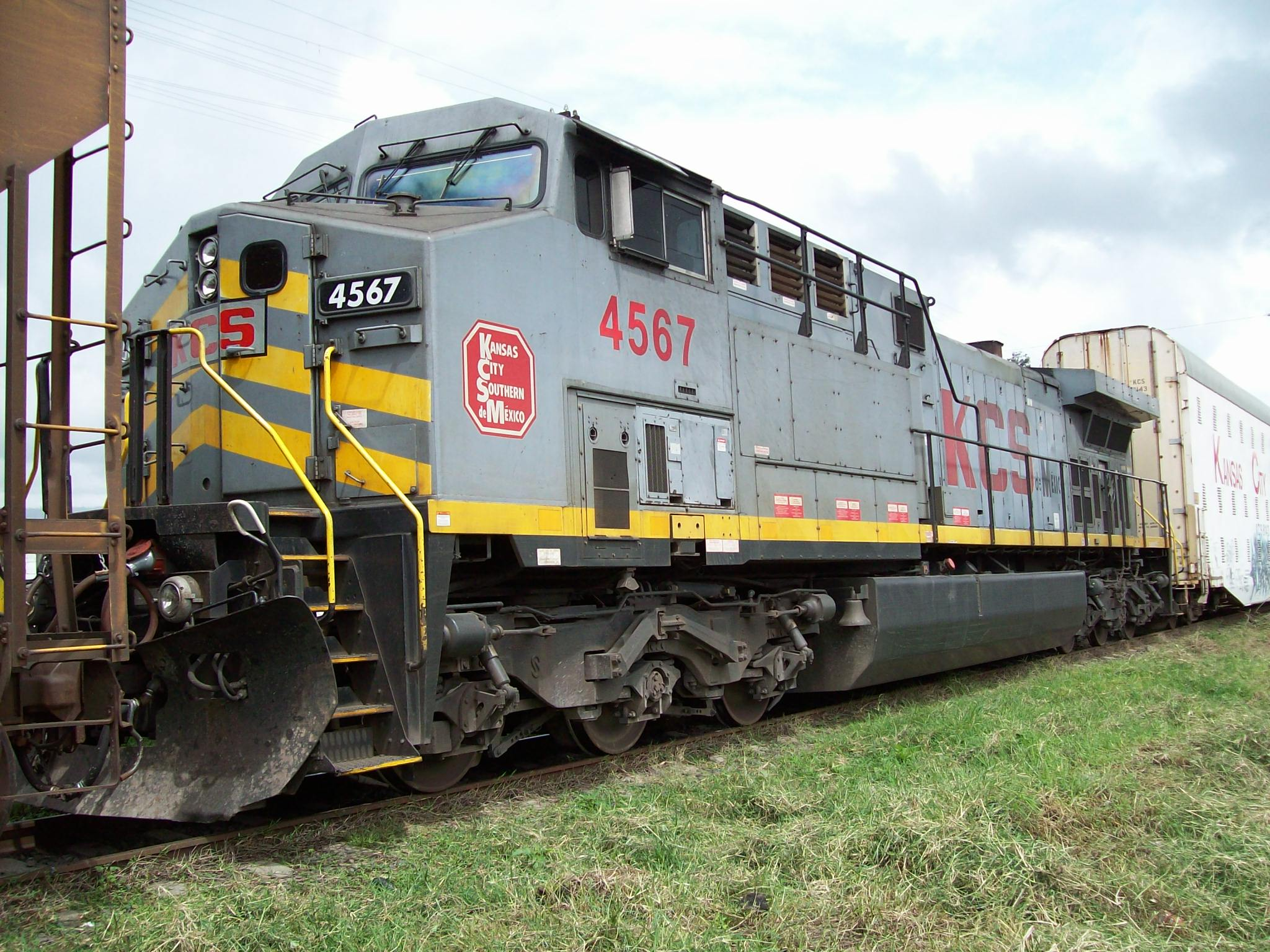
KCSM #4567, a GE AC4400CW from CPKC that still retains the gray Transportadora Ferroviaria Mexicana (TFM) scheme with the KCS de Mexico logos and lettering painted over where the TFM logos used to be

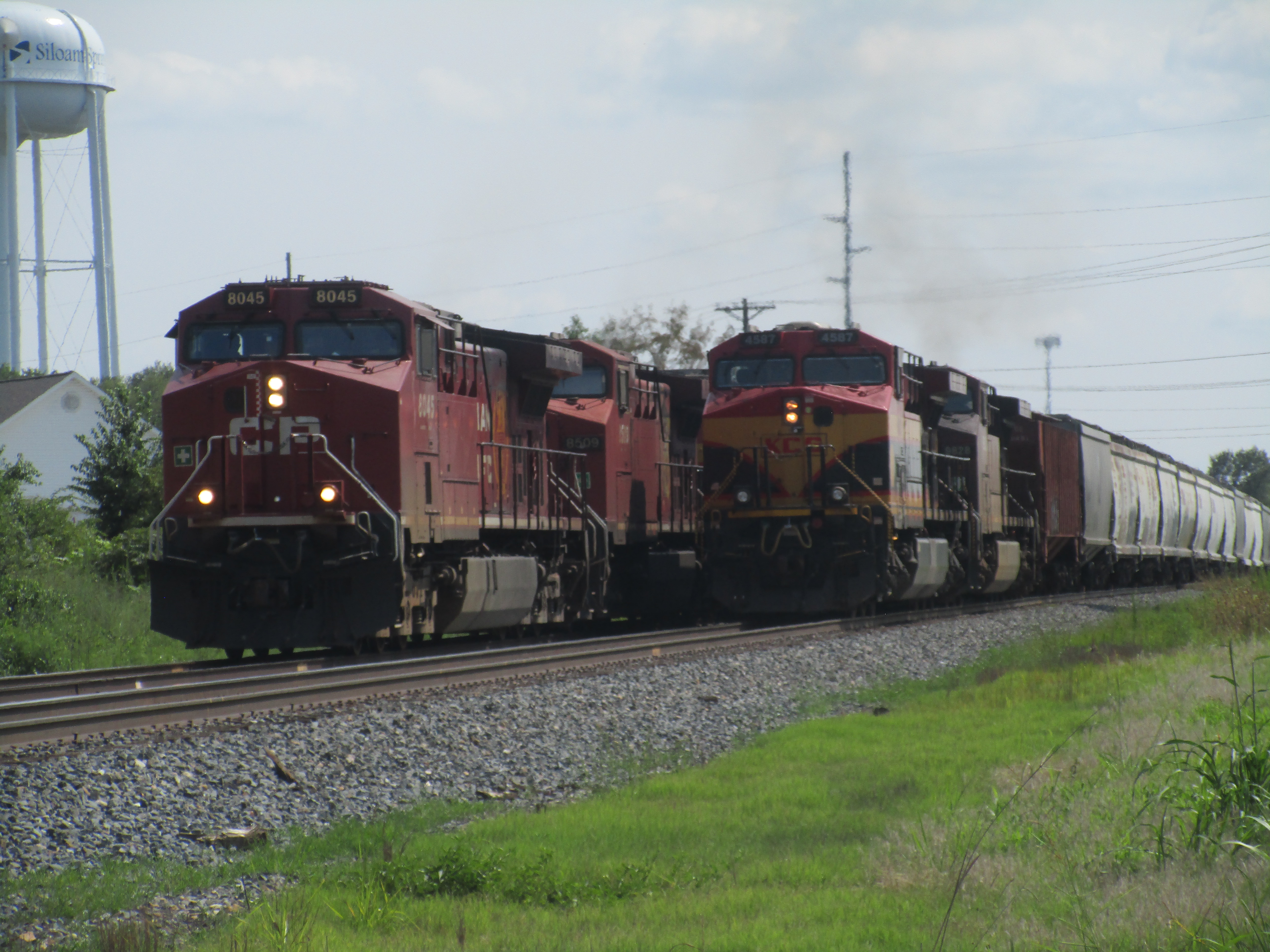
Two CPKC unit trains, one grain and another crude oil, meet up at Siloam Springs, Arkansas, with locomotives from each of the two preceding railroads.

The merger created the first and, as of 2023 only, railway corporation connecting Canada, the U.S., and Mexico without having to run trains on competing railroads' rails. It had about 32,000-kilometre (20,000 mi) network of tracks. Fully integrating the two railroads was expected to take up to three years.

=== Post-merger history ===
Seven days after the merger, the company announced that it had landed its first major contract, handling Schneider National intermodal traffic between the U.S. and Mexico. On April 25, it signed a similar agreement with Knight-Swift. The announcement was seen as backing up pre-merger projections that CPKC's service would enable it to compete in the Chicago–Mexico corridor that had been dominated by the Union Pacific and BNSF. In response, on April 24, Union Pacific responded by announcing a partnership with Canadian National Railway and Grupo México (owner of Ferromex and Ferrosur) to work together to accelerate the exchange of intermodal traffic between Mexico and Chicago or further north into Canada.

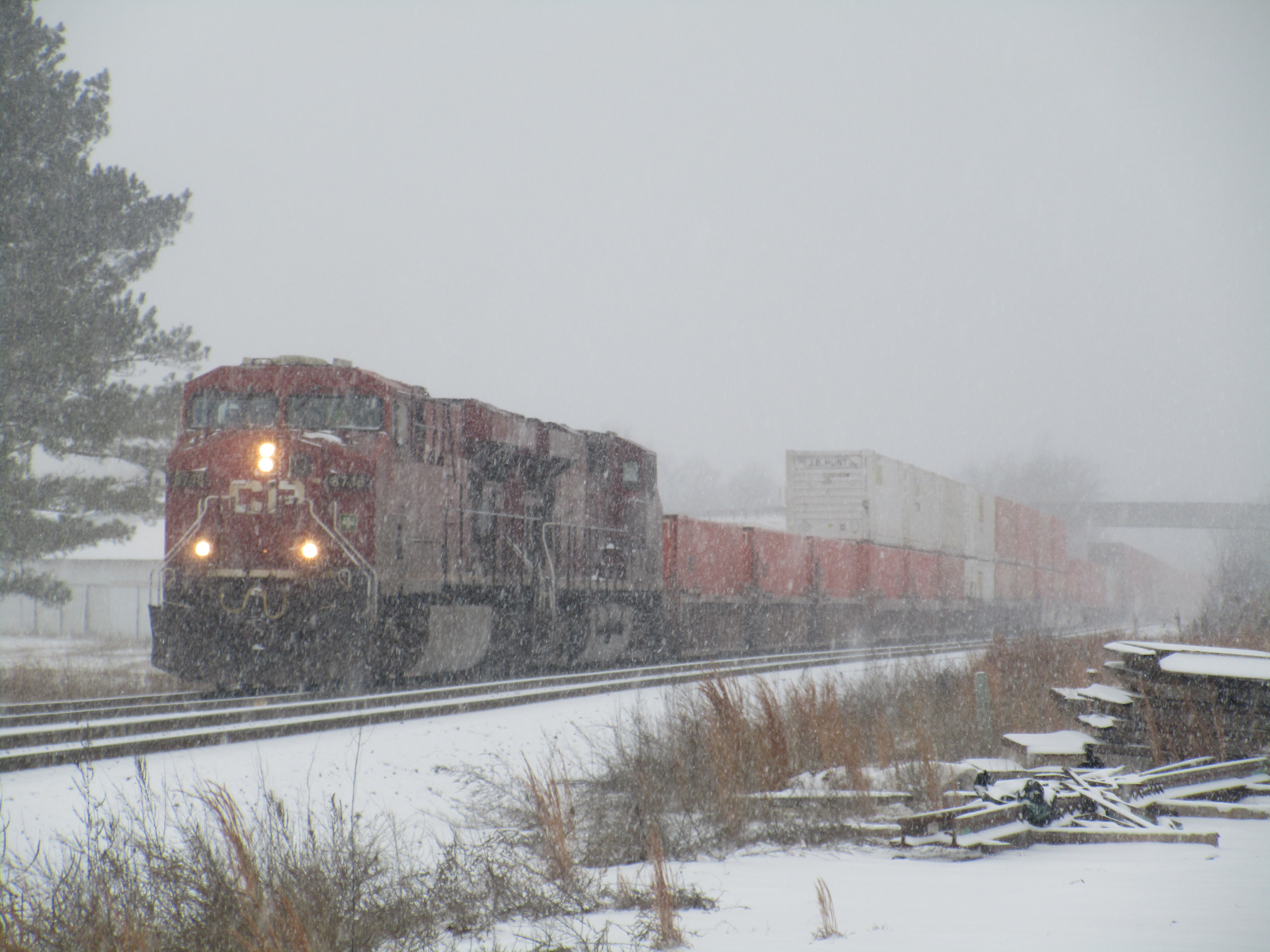
CPKC Train I181 (Northbound) at Gentry, Arkansas

On May 11, 2023, CPKC launched its "Mexico Midwest Express (MMX)" service, numbered I180 and I181, which is mainly oriented to intermodal and automobile transportation, and also provides an approximate travel time of 98 hours between Chicago and Kansas City to Monterrey and San Luis Potosi, shorter times than those offered by the "Falcon Premium" service of UP, CN and Grupo México. Previously, and as part of preparatory moves for the day after the merger, CP and KCS launched a series of test interline services between the Lázaro Cárdenas Port in the Michoacán Mexican state and the Bensenville Yard in Chicago.

On June 28, 2023, CPKC announced the intent to jointly acquire with CSX Transportation the Meridian and Bigbee Railroad (MNBR). The MNBR creates a connection 168 miles (270 km) between CSX in Montgomery, Alabama and Meridian, Mississippi, where it joins the Meridian Speedway westbound. Under the proposed agreement, CPKC would acquire the 50.4 miles (81.1 km) segment of the line between Meridian and Myrtlewood, Alabama, so-called Western Line, while CSX, in a nearly separate transaction, will resume operations on the so-called Eastern Line, between Myrtlewood and Montgomery, terminating the lease currently in place with MNBR. MNBR will cease operating between Myrtlewood and Montgomery, although it may continue to operate between Meridian and Myrtlewood and serve existing customers on that segment of the line. If the STB approves the transaction, this will provide a new direct connection between the two companies' networks (CSX and CPKC already have connections New Orleans and in St. Louis, Missouri). In compensation, MNBR owner Genesee & Wyoming would receive CPKC properties in Alberta along with rights on CPKC lines. The connection through the MNBR line will allow CSX traffic destined for Mexico to be delivered directly to CPKC, eliminating the need for a third intermediary railroad to move such traffic. Currently, CSX traffic bound for Mexico is exchanged with the Union Pacific in New Orleans, who then takes it to the cross-border gateway in Laredo, Texas, where it is delivered to CPKC. MNBR's Western Line, once acquired by CPKC, will be renamed Haverty Subdivision, in honor of former KCS CEO and President Mike Haverty, the original driver of the idea to acquire MNBR more than two decades ago, to tie the KCS and CSX rail networks.

Haverty, who served as KCS CEO and president from 1995 to 2015, was the driving force behind the company's expansion to Mexico during his tenure, acquiring Tex-Mex in 1995 and then, that same year, win along with Transportadora Maritima Mexicana (TMM), the concession of the Mexican Northeast Railroad under the name Transportadora Ferroviaria Mexicana (TFM), which would ultimately become the catalyst for CP to acquire KCS.

In October 2024, the STB approved CPKC's purchase of the M&B line between Meridian and Myrtlewood, and CSX's resumption of operations between Myrtlewood and Burkville. The agreement became effective on November 16, 2024. For the first five years, CPKC and CSX will interchange two trains per day in each direction.

A few days before CPKC and CSX took over the former M&B line, Schneider National, CPKC's main intermodal partner and one of CSX's major partners, announced that a new interline service connecting the Southeast (Florida and Georgia) with the Texas and Mexico markets via the route between Montgomery and Meridian will be launched beginning in December.

CN and Amtrak unsuccessfully objected to the purchase of the M&B line, fearing that increased traffic on the Meridian Speedway would cause congestion in the line. CN required CPKC to report the daily number of trains running through the Speedway to know if there will indeed be congestion on the line. Amtrak, for its part, requested that the daily traffic on the line be adjusted to the length of the existing sidings along the route.

The CN and Amtrak requests were rejected by the STB, on the grounds that the two daily train pairs that CPKC and CSX plan to interchange across the M&B line will not cause congestion on the Speedway.

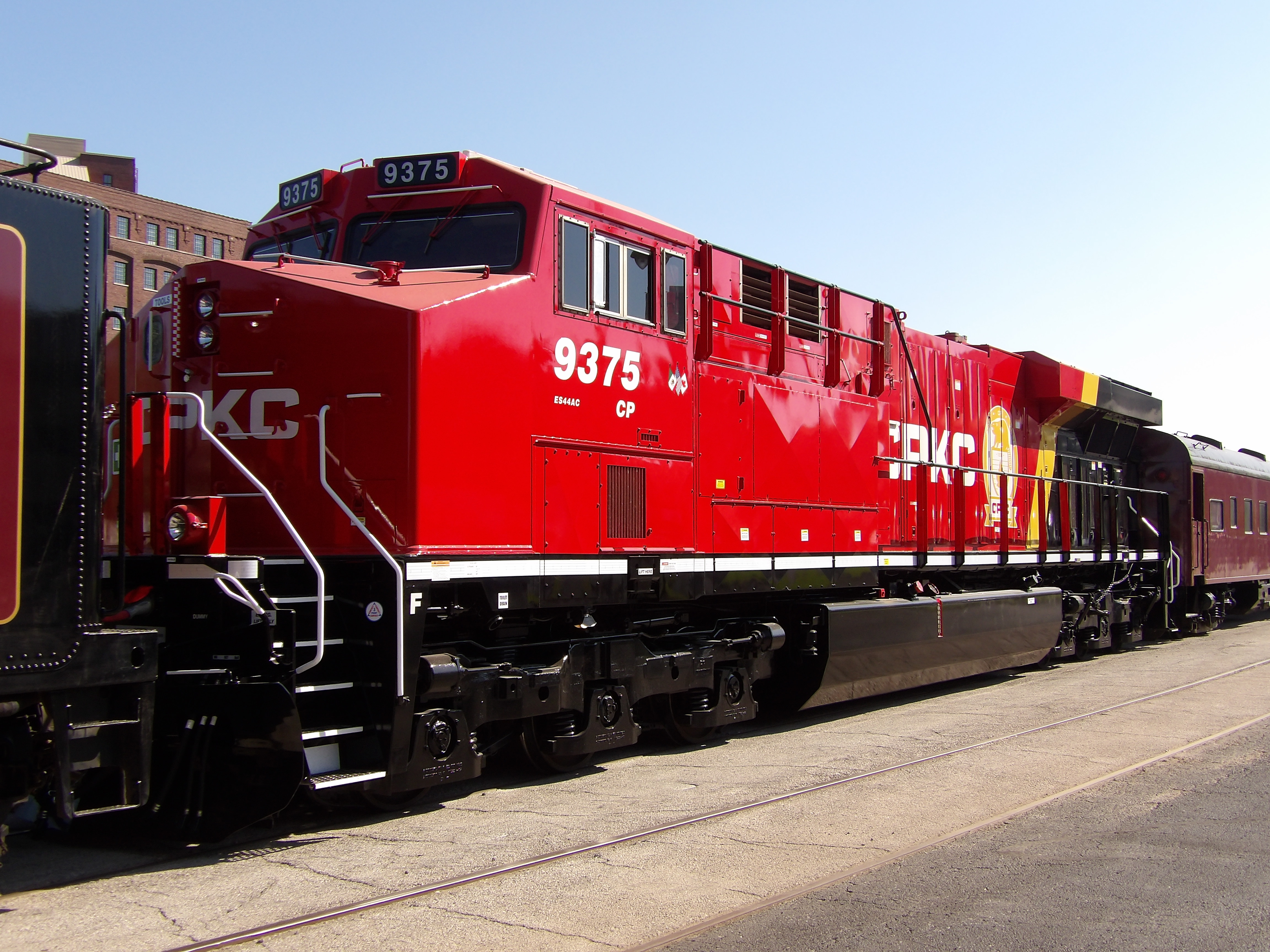
CP 9375 is displayed as part of the 2816 'Final Spike tour' event at Kansas City Union Station. The 9375 is the first locomotive to receive the CPKC corporate paint scheme.

In August 2023, UP and CPKC butted heads again, this time over the scope of the original "North End" and "South End" agreement granting KCS trackage and haulage rights only for grain shipments from the Omaha / Council Bluffs area to Gulf Coast ports. CPKC informed the STB that UP was blocking the use of trackage and haulage rights dating back to the 1988 merger between the Missouri-Kansas-Texas Railroad (MKT), better known as "The Katy", and UP. CPKC inherited those rights from KCS. When UP acquired the Katy, Interstate Commerce Commission (ICC) required UP, as a condition of merger approval, to grant other railroads (including KCS) trackage and haulage rights to operate in the "Omaha/Council Bluffs-Kansas City corridor, with a further ability to move the grain traffic originating in this area to the Gulf." The conflict arose because UP considered that CPKC was violating the original 1988 UP and KCS agreement. The original agreement stated that only grain trains originating in the Omaha/Council Bluffs area would be covered by the “South End” rights agreement between Beaumont and the ports of Houston and Galveston. KCS had sporadically used the "North End" rights between Kansas City and Council Bluffs, along with the "South End" rights from Beaumont to south, but after the merger, grain elevators located on the former CP system, primarily in North Dakota and Minnesota, expressed interest in using the CPKC system to transport their grains from the Upper Midwest to Gulf ports, utilizing the "South End" rights. UP considered this to be a breach of the agreement. In July 2025, the STB ruled in favor of CPKC in the litigation against UP over the "South End" agreement.

In its ruling, the Board determines that the term "interchange" in the 1988 agreement includes the exchange of traffic between rail carriers under common control (CP and KCS).

In January 2024, Bison Transport, Winnipeg, MB, based intermodal mover, signed a major agreement with CPKC capitalizing on the company's growing crossborder intermodal traffic between Canada, US and Mexico. Such a partnership would allow immediate access to cross-border multimodal services using CPKC's rail corridors, while taking advantage of the reliability and punctuality of travel times handled by CPKC trains along its corridor from Chicago to Mexico, primarily the "Mexico Midwest Express" (MMX, I180/I181 trains).

In April 2024, as part of the company's first anniversary celebrations, the Steam locomotive CPR #2816 known as "The Empress" was launched on a historic transnational tour that traveled most of CPKC's network, starting April 24 in Calgary and ending June 7 in Mexico City. On June 9, began its return travel from Mexico City to Calgary, arriving on July 10.

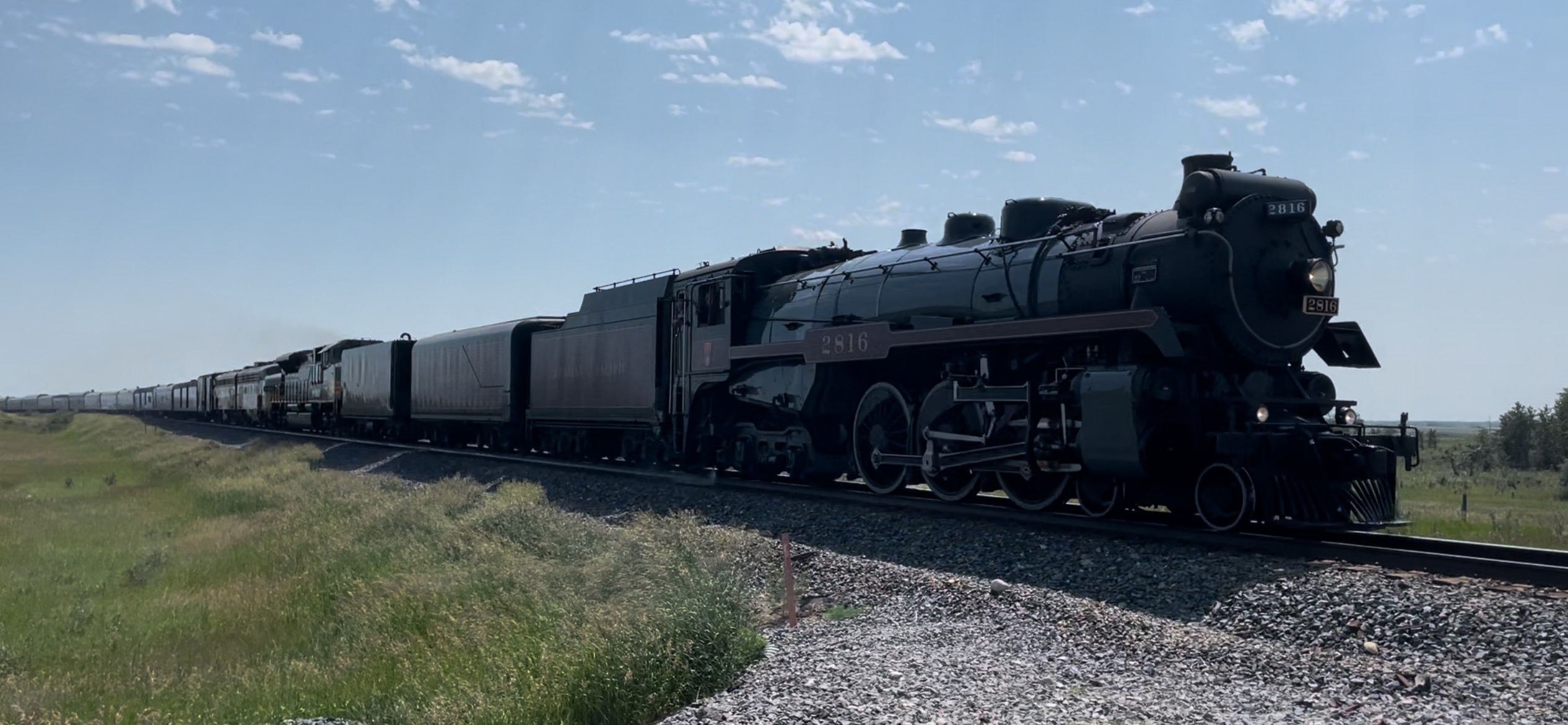
2816 during its Final Spike Steam Tour, July 10, 2024, in Gleichen, Alberta

CPKC and Canadian National locked out workers in Canada from August 22 to 26, 2024, after the companies and the Teamsters Canada Rail Conference failed to reach a labor agreement.

In Mexico, CPKC has spent more than $75 million to build new sidings, double-track sections, bypass tracks, add yard leads, and create faster turnouts. These were not initially envisioned as part of the CP-KCS merger. It is working to improve the Port of Lázaro Cárdenas, also promoting it as an alternative to the congestion at Long Beach, Los Angeles, and other West Coast ports for intermodal shipments to and from CPKC's terminals in Kendleton, near Houston, and Wylie, in the Dallas-Fort Worth area, and other points served by the company.

In December 2024, construction was completed on the second crossborder bridge in Laredo–Nuevo Laredo, which ended the bottleneck created by the previous single-tracked bridge. KCS's CEO and President, Patrick "Pat" J. Ottensmeyer had pushed for the new bridge during his tenure at KCS, prior to the merger with CP. He died in July 2024, and CPKC's directors named the new bridge in his memory. CPKC CEO Creel met with Mexican President Claudia Sheinbaum to settle an opening date for the bridge, and the details of a new Mexico City-San Luis Potosi-Monterrey-Nuevo Laredo passenger train to be run primarily on CPKC tracks. The newly renamed double-track "Patrick J. Ottensmeyer International Railway Bridge" opened on 6 February 2025.

As CP has been doing since 1999 until 2022, CPKC has continued to run holiday trains from mid-November through December, which now with the combined network are deployed along the company's entire tracks network. In both 2023 and now in 2024, two Holidays trains made up of ex-CP rolling stock run through the central and northern end of the company's network, and two more trains made up of former KCS and KCSM Office Car Special (OCS) trains run through the southern end of the company's network.

In early 2025, CPKC was promoting bonded shipments between Canada and Mexico without the need to clear US customs, thus avoiding any tariffs imposed on foreign countries by the Trump administration. This service was faster than using trucks or rival railways because CPKC did not need to interchange with other US railways. For example, shipments of Canadian oats to Mexico have quadrupled in volume. Other products transported by CPKC from Canada to Mexico include liquid petroleum gas, refined fuels and plastics. In the other direction, CPKC is transporting Mexican fruits and vegetables, home appliances and furniture to Canada where, due to Canadian counter tariffs, can be cheaper than US imports.

In December 2025, CPKC became one of the companies that has most strongly opposed the proposed merger between UP and Norfolk Southern, and plans to submit its comments to the STB in accordance with the hearing schedule adopted by the STB during the proceedings.

Later that same month, CPKC, along with BNSF, CSX, and CN, decided to file a submission with the STB, stating that the initial proposal from UP and NS was considered incomplete because it omitted key information.

== Operations ==
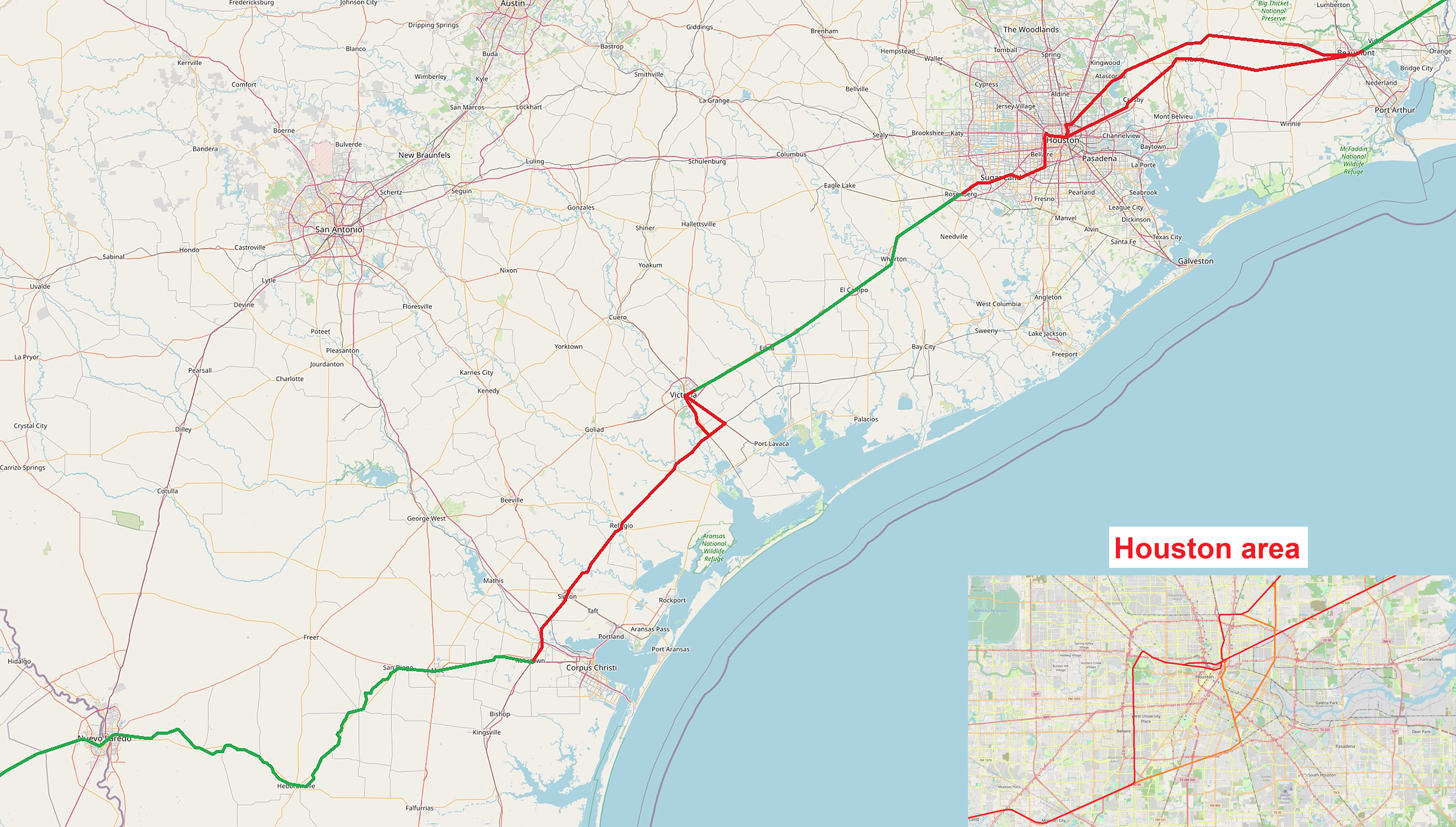
CPKC's fast-growing international corridor from Beaumont to Laredo: owned routes are marked in green, while sectors where trains run under Union Pacific trackage rights between Beaumont and Rosenberg (including the Houston area), and between Victoria and Robstown are marked in red. In the case of traffic through Houston, the usual routes are marked in red and detours used in case of congestion on the usual route are marked in orange. Between Beaumont and Houston, CPKC trains use UP's directional running, where northbound trains run on the Beaumont Sub, and southbound trains run on the Sunset Route.

CPKC operates about 32,000 kilometres (20,000 mi) of rail across Canada, Mexico and the United States. As of April 2023, CPKC has around 20,000 employees. CPKC has its global headquarters in Calgary, Alberta, Canada with its U.S. headquarters in Kansas City, Missouri, and its Mexico headquarters in Mexico City and Monterrey.

Company executives said that merging CP and KCS would be "straightforward" because the railroads only touch at Kansas City, and interchange volumes were relatively low, with about four trains per day as of September 2021. They also cited that the two companies largely used the same back-office information technology systems.

The railroad maintains its own police force, the Canadian Pacific Kansas City Police.

== Sponsorships ==
CPKC inherited and renewed CP's existing sponsorship of the Canadian Women's Open golf tournament in July 2023, extending it through 2026.

In October 2023, CPKC and the Kansas City Current of the National Women's Soccer League announced a 10-year naming rights deal for the Current's new stadium in Kansas City, Missouri, the first stadium ever constructed specifically for a professional women's sports team.
