= Kansas City Southern de México =

Mexican railway company

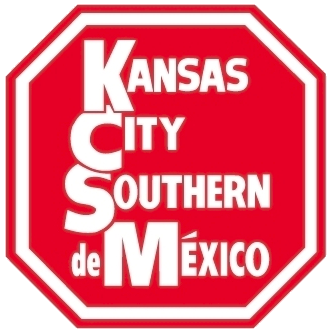

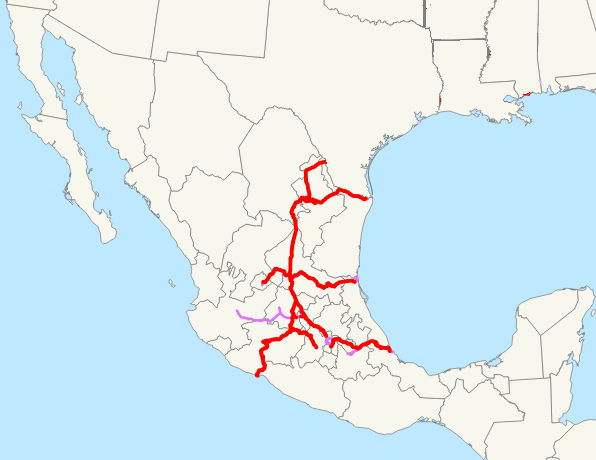
- Kansas City Southern de México system map

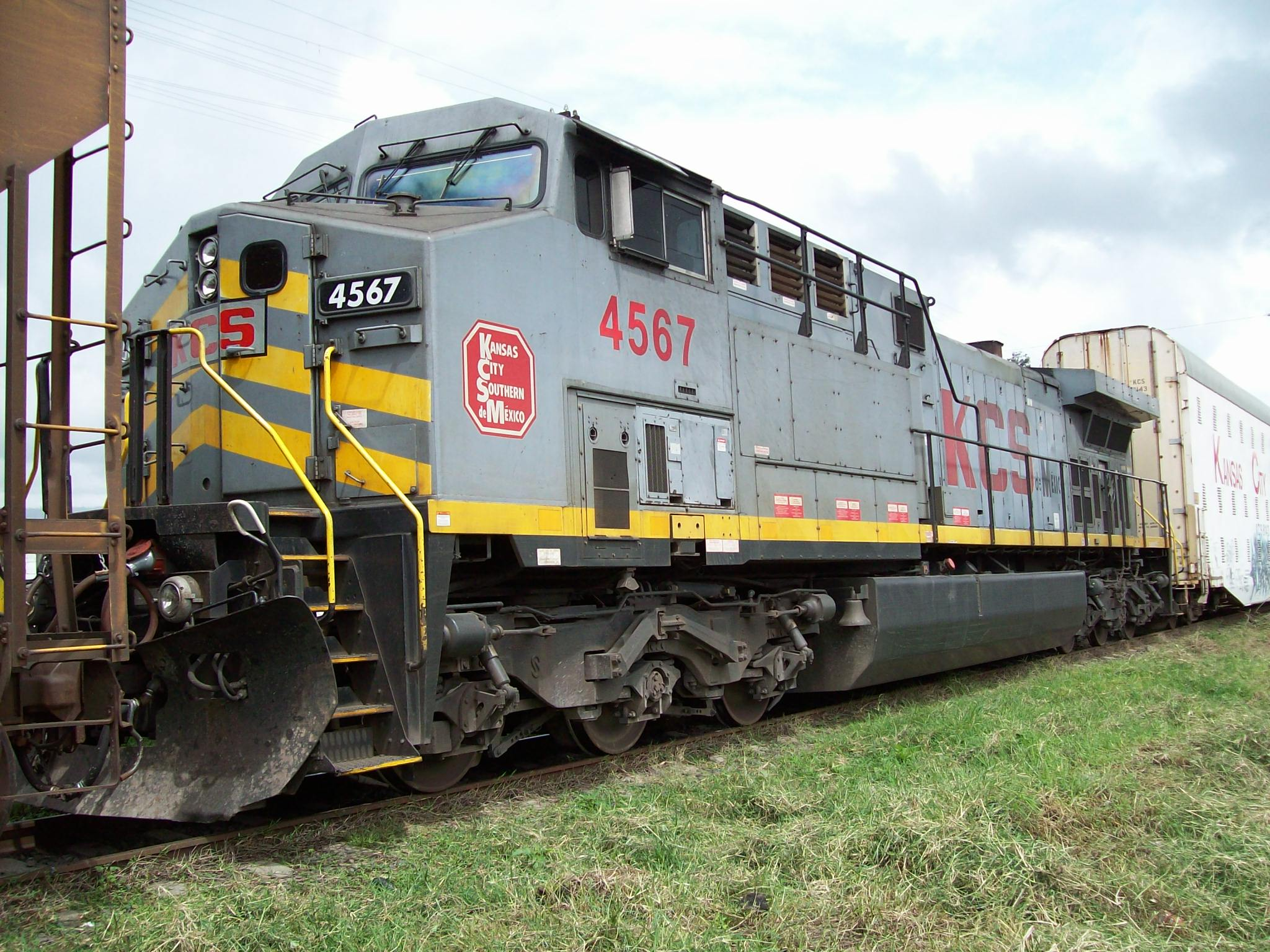
- KCSM 4567, a GE AC4400CW, near Caltzonzin station

Overview
- Parent company: CPKC
- Headquarters: Monterrey, Nuevo León
- Reporting mark: KCSM
- Locale: Northeastern Mexico
- Dates of operation: 1997–present
- Predecessor: Ferrocarriles Nacionales de México

Technical
- Track gauge: 1,435 mm (4 ft 8 1/2 in) standard gauge
- Length: 5,335 km (3,315 mi)

Other
- Website: kcsouthern.com

Kansas City Southern de México, S.A. de C.V. (reporting mark KCSM) is a Mexican railroad and operating subsidiary of Canadian Pacific Kansas City Limited (CPKC). The company was founded in 1996 as Transportación Ferroviaria Mexicana (reporting mark TFM), a joint venture between KCS and Transportación Maritima Mexicana after the companies won a concession from the Mexican government to operate the 5,335-kilometer (3,315 mi) Northeast Railroad connecting Monterrey and Mexico City with a US port of entry at Laredo, Texas and seaports at Lázaro Cárdenas and Veracruz. In 2005, KCS bought out its partner's shares in the railroad, giving it full control.

Canadian Pacific Railway purchased KCSM in December 2021 for US$31 billion. On April 14, 2023, KCS and KCSM became subsidiaries of CPR, and began conducting business under the name of their new parent, CPKC.

== History ==
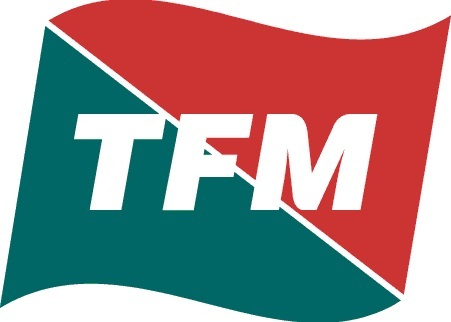
The TFM logo used before KCS purchased the railroad

Kansas City Southern de México was originally formed in 1996 when Kansas City Southern Industries and Transportación Maritima Mexicana (TMM) purchased a government concession to operate on a rail system in Mexico. It was the Mexican President, Ernesto Zedillo, who proposed the privatization of the Mexican railways because the Mexican railway system had fallen into a state of disrepair and needed drastic work to become profitable. Since the late 1930s, Mexican trains and tracks were the property of the government as Ferrocarriles Nacionales de México (Mexican National Railways). When the decision to privatize the railroad was made, only 15% of freight was moved by rail in Mexico (versus 42% in the US).

The most sought-after portion of the concessions, called the Northeast Railroad, was bid on by many major companies, including the United States' largest railroad company, Union Pacific Railroad. This concession included about 5,335 kilometers (3,315 mi) of track with connections to many key cities, including Monterrey, Mexico City, and Laredo, Texas. This track carried 46% of all rail traffic in Mexico and 60% of all freight coming from the United States. KCSM and TMM bid and won the concession for US$1.4 billion for the rights to operate the concession, paying 49% and 51% respectively.

In 2005, Kansas City Southern Industries purchased Transportación Maritima Mexicana's share in TFM, giving them full ownership of the company, and the TFM was officially renamed Kansas City Southern de México.

Eleven of Mexico's 14 auto assembly plants, plus two more under construction, are located on the railroad. Automobile traffic (autos and parts) accounted for 9% of the 2012 total carloads.

== Key connections ==
- Guadalajara
- Laredo, Texas – United States port of entry
- Lázaro Cárdenas – Pacific Ocean port
- México City – served by Ferrovalle, a terminal railroad co-owned by KCSM
- Monterrey
- Queretaro
- Saltillo
- San Luis Potosí
- Tampico
- Veracruz – Atlantic Ocean port

== See also ==
- Kansas City Southern Railway
- Rail transport in Mexico
- Railroad classes
