= Ferrocarriles Nacionales de México =

Former state-owned railroad in Mexico

- N de M
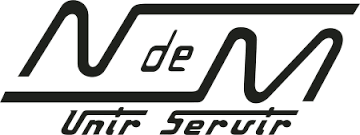

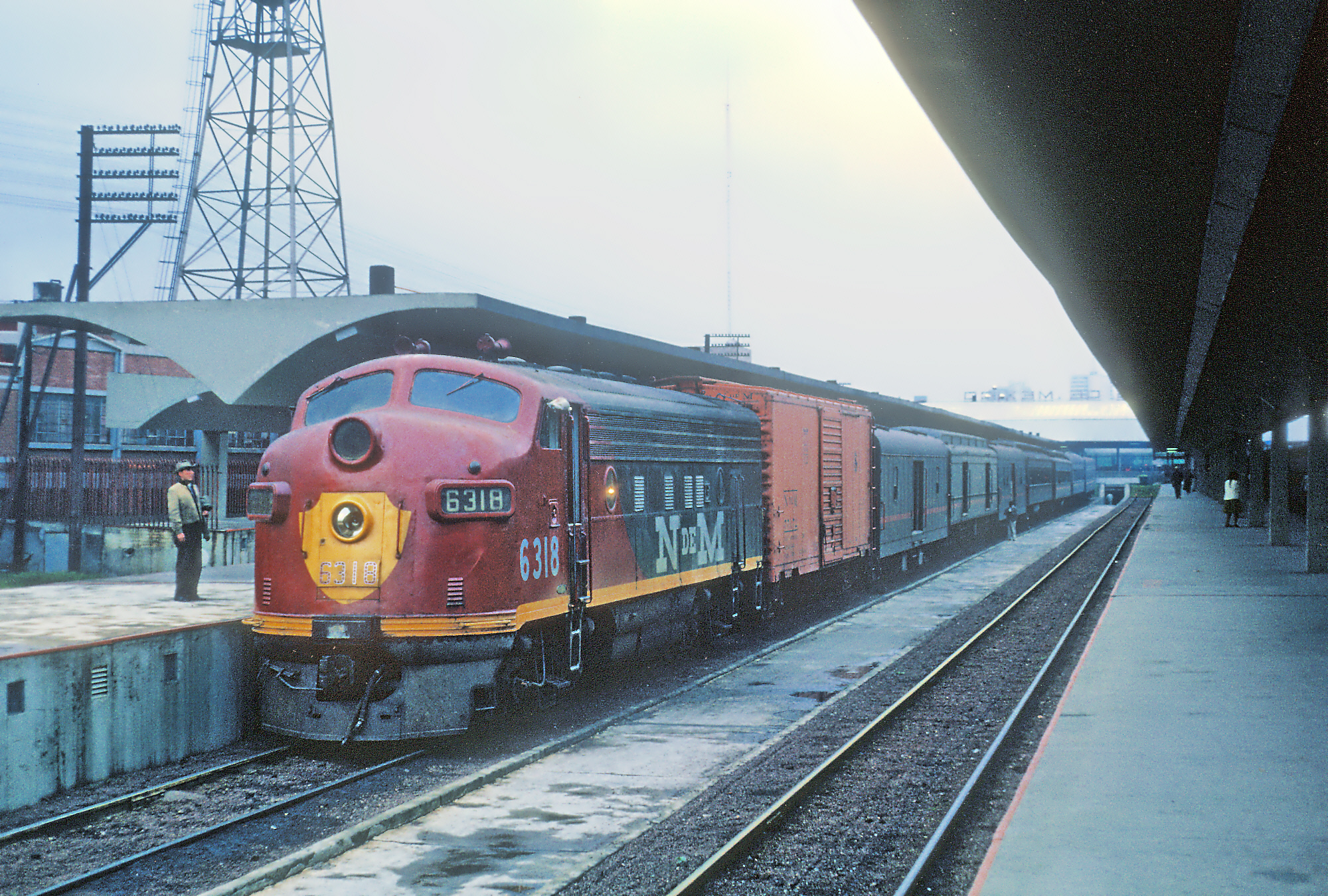
- An NdeM passenger train, led by an EMD F7a at Mexico City in 1966.

Overview
- Parent company: Federal government of Mexico (1903–1998)
- Reporting mark: NDEM; NDM; NDMZ
- Locale: Mexico
- Dates of operation: 1903–2001

Technical
- Track gauge: 4 ft 8 1/2 in (1,435 mm) standard gauge
- Previous gauge: 3 ft (914 mm) some lines

Ferrocarriles Nacionales de México (better known as N de M and after 1987 as Ferronales or FNM) or National Railways of Mexico was Mexico's state owned railroad company from 1938 to 1998, and prior to 1938 (dating from the regime of Porfirio Díaz), a major railroad controlled by the government that linked Mexico City to the major cities of Ciudad Juárez, Nuevo Laredo and Matamoros on the U.S. border. The first trains to Nuevo Laredo from Mexico City began operating in 1903.

== History ==
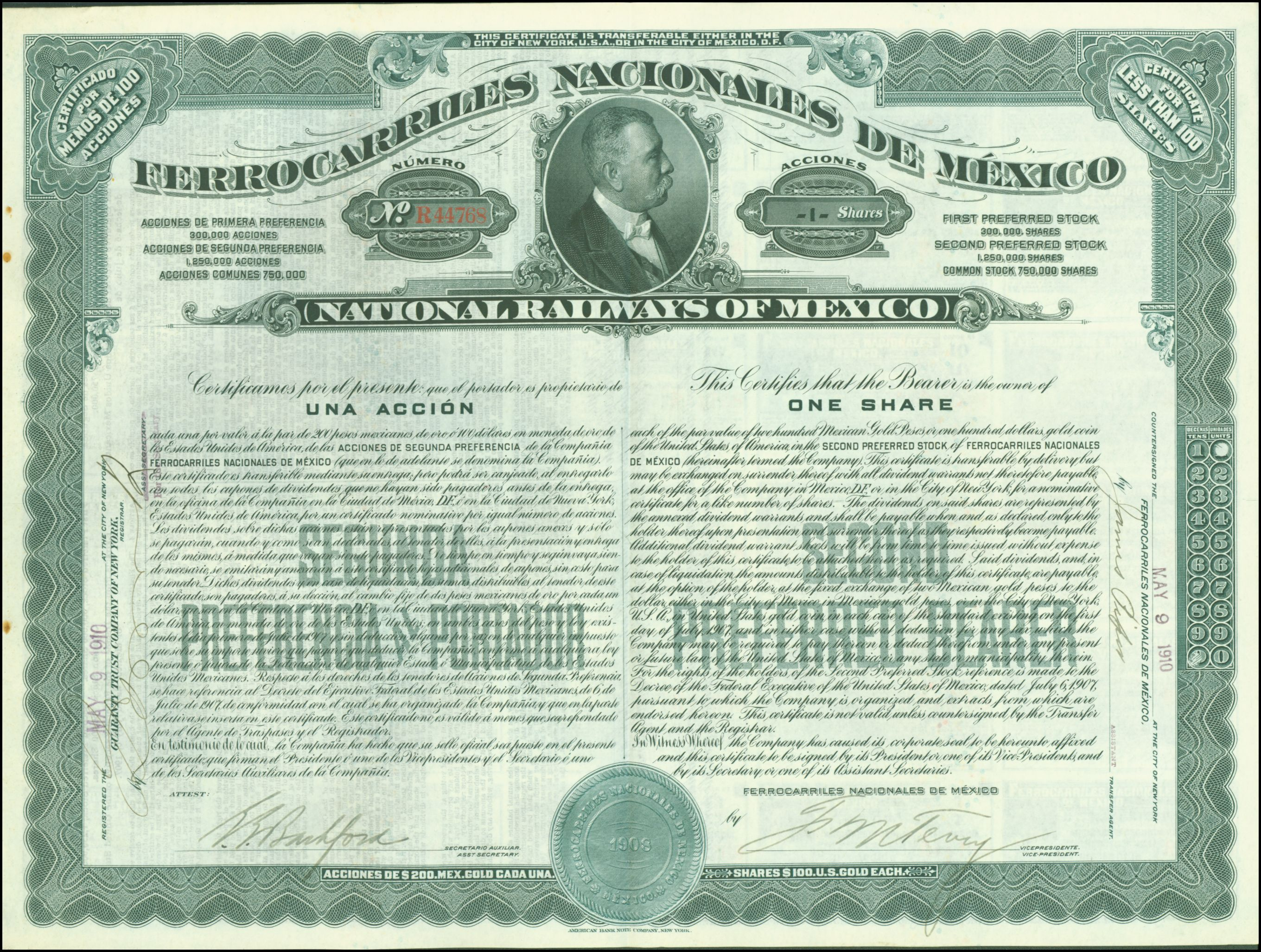
Share of the National Railways of Mexico, issued 9. May 1910

The beginnings of rail transport in Mexico date back to the concessions granted by Maximilian I of Mexico, mostly to foreign companies, and continued by Benito Juárez.

In 1898, José Yves Limantour proposed a system of concessions of the railway companies on the future lines to be built from 1900. That same year the Secretariat of the Treasury promulgated the first General Railway Law. This law established a system whereby concessions would be granted to companies to lay railway lines only when they satisfied the economic needs of the country and linked the interior of the Republic with its most important commercial ports.

The N de M company was created in 1903 during the tenure of Porfirio Díaz, and it was through said company that most of the Mexican railway network was developed. In fact, before the Porfiriato, only the Mexico City–Veracruz segment was in operation, since Gen. Díaz's greatest interest was to develop the country industrially, he had a special affinity for the railroad.

Pursuant to an agreement signed on February 29, 1908, N de M absorbed the Mexican Central Railroad (Ferrocarril Central Mexicano, first section from Mexico City to León, Guanajuato, opened in 1882) in 1909, thus acquiring a second border gateway at Ciudad Juárez (adjacent to El Paso, Texas). This gave the Mexican federal government a 58% stake in N de M. The N de M was fully nationalized by President Lázaro Cárdenas del Río in 1938, and privatized in 1994–98 by Presidents Carlos Salinas de Gortari and Ernesto Zedillo. Until 1987, N de M operated most railway trackage through the central and northeastern regions of the country. The Ferrocarril del Pacífico (or Pacific Railroad) and the Ferrocarril Chihuahua al Pacífico operated railroads in the northwest.

In 1987, President Miguel de la Madrid merged the N de M and the country's five existing regional rail operators into the wider Ferronales (FMN) parastatal organization.

In 1995, due to FNM's serious financial difficulties, the Mexican government announced that FNM would be privatized and divided into four main systems. As part of the restructuring for privatization, FNM suspended passenger rail service in 1997, and the new arrangements applied from 1998; by then FNM ceased to be the operator and administrator of most of its major railway routes. The companies were Kansas City Southern de Mexico, Ferromex, Ferrosur, and (owned jointly by the three companies) Ferrocarril y Terminal del Valle de México or Ferrovalle which operates railroads and terminals in and around Mexico City.

It was not until June 4, 2001, during Vicente Fox's presidency that FNM as an organization was officially extinguished, as confirmed by a publication in Mexican Official's Gazette. FNM will continue to exist legally as a state-owned shell entity under liquidation (as Ferrocarriles Nacionales de México en Liquidación) until the conclusion of the liquidation process.

As of 2026, FNM en Liquidación still owns some lines (23% of which are shortline railroads) where concessions cannot be granted or are considered to be of importance for the national economy, such as the Trans-Istmico, which goes from Salina Cruz, Oaxaca to Coatzacoalcos, Veracruz, although their direct operations are through Ferrocarril del Istmo de Tehuantepec. Since 2012, FNM en Liquidación as well as its associated liquidation process and settlement of existing liabilities has been headed by an undersecretariat of the Secretariat of Communications and Transportation (SCT).

=== Locomotives ===
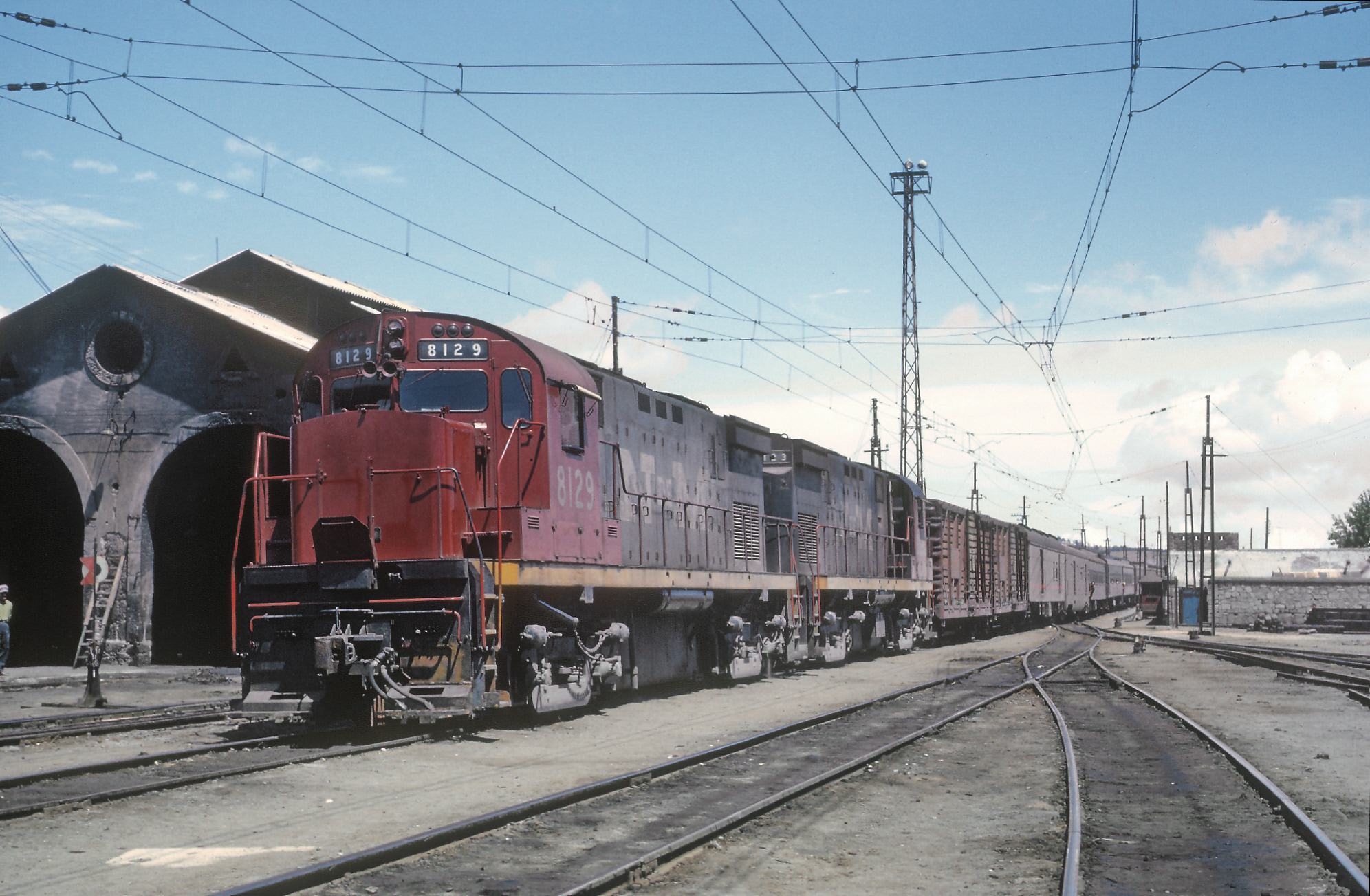
NdeM ALCO C424 8129 leads a train in Esperanza in 1966

During the days of steam locomotives, N de M was best known for operating Niágara class locomotives, which took their name from the New York Central Railroad locomotives of the same wheel configuration. It was also the home of several 3 ft (914 mm) narrow gauge systems that used steam, both nationally and regionally. N de M was one of the few railroads outside the US to purchase new diesel locomotives from Baldwin Locomotive Works: the only three "Baldwin E-units" ever built (DR-6-4-2000), the DR-12-8-1500/2 and the AS-616. Two of the three DR-6-4-2000 locomotives had been on major railroads in the United States on a demonstration tour in 1945. N de M bought them in August 1945 and ordered a third in August 1946. All three consistently broke down and were retired soon after their factory warranties expired and were scrapped in September 1957. They do not appear on the 1958 N de M locomotive roster, and sat for years in the scrapyard at San Luis Potosí. Notes in the FNM archives in Puebla, Mexico describe how one of these locomotives had a wheel disintegrate at high speed, and also how the Centipede locomotives were delivered in 1948 with parts missing.

In Acámbaro, Guanajuato, N de M operated one of the few facilities in Latin America that was capable of constructing and doing complete rebuilds of steam locomotives, thus with rare exceptions (as with the Niagaras), most of N de M steam motive power was purchased used and rebuilt there. Portions of the facility and a preserved 2-8-0 steam locomotive remain as part of Acambaro's municipal railway museum.

== Notable named passenger trains of the N de M ==
Named trains usually bore names related to the destination, for example, El Purépecha referred to the Purépecha peoples of western Michoacán.

- El Jarocho - Mexico City - Veracruz, Veracruz.
- Águila Azteca - Mexico City - Monterrey - Nuevo Laredo, with the addition name, the Texas Eagle for continued service to San Antonio and St. Louis and connections to Amtrak for continued service to Chicago
- El Azteca - Mexico City - Querétaro - León - Aguascalientes - El Paso, Texas
- La Estrella del Sur - Mexico City - Puebla - Oaxaca de Juárez
- El Regiomontano - Mexico City - Monterrey - Nuevo Laredo
- El Fronterizo - Mexico City - Chihuahua - Ciudad Juárez - El Paso, Texas; as #7/8, it had connections to Southern Pacific Railroad connections to Los Angeles
- El Nocturno - Mexico City - Toluca - Morelia - Uruapan
- El Oaxaqueño - Mexico City - Puebla - Oaxaca de Juárez
- El Purépecha - Mexico City - Morelia - Uruapan - Lázaro Cárdenas (Michoacán)
- El Tapatío - Mexico City - Guadalajara
- El Rápido de la Frontera (railcar service) Chihuahua - Ciudad Juárez - with nearby connections to the north in El Paso
- El Hidalguense - Mexico City - Pachuca, Hidalgo

The Águila Azteca/Texas Eagle service was in conjunction with the Missouri Pacific railroad. Later with Amtrak, connections could be made in Laredo with Amtrak's Inter-American. Besides connections in Ciudad Juarez and Nuevo Laredo, there were connections to trains in the United States in Guadalajara, Piedras Negras and Matamoros. To the south there were connections to Guatemala in Ciudad Hidalgo.

Other passenger service was provided between Mexico City and: Cuernavaca, Morelos; Tampico, Tamaulipas; and Guanajuato, Guanajuato

Buenavista railway station in Mexico City served as the terminal and after 2005, it was renovated and serves as the southern end of the electric Tren Suburbano line. Photos of Buenavista often prominently feature a pyramid-like tower, the Torre Insignia. The building housed the headquarters of Banobras, but currently is unoccupied and it has been renovated. A preserved Niagara steam locomotive and GE boxcab can be viewed at the Museum of Electricity at Chapultepec, Mexico City. Many more preserved Mexican steam, diesel and electric locomotives can be viewed at the FNM museum in Puebla, Mexico.

== In popular culture ==
- In 1999, sound artist and musician Chris Watson worked as an audio recorder for the BBC riding the "Ghost Train" in the fourth episode of the fourth season of the television documentary series Great Railway Journeys. Having spent between five weeks and a month on the journey, Watson used to the field recordings for his 2011 album El Tren Fantasma.
- In 2016, a fictional character named Carlos introduced in the Thomas & Friends movie The Great Race was based on the preserved ex-Ferrocarriles Nacionales de México 2-8-0 steam locomotive No.903.

== See also ==
- List of Mexican railroads
- Mexico City–Querétaro electric passenger train
