= List of Montclair High School (New Jersey) alumni =

This is a list of notable alumni of the Montclair High School in Montclair, New Jersey.

== Arts and architecture ==
- Nanette Carter (born 1954), artist and college educator, best known for her collages with paper, canvas, and Mylar
- Lola Flash (born 1959), large-scale photographer
- Rees Jones (born 1941), golf course architect
- Robert Trent Jones Jr. (born 1939, class of 1957), golf course architect

== Business ==
- Clarence Birdseye (1886–1956), founder of the modern frozen food industry
- George V. Holton (1890–1972), chairman of Mobil Oil
- Charles B. Johnson (born 1933, class of 1950), businessman
- J. Erik Jonsson (1901–1995), businessman, philanthropist, and former mayor of Dallas, Texas
- John McMullen (1918–2005), former owner of the New Jersey Devils and Houston Astros
- Robert Crooks Stanley (1876–1951), former chairman and president of International Nickel Company, known for discovering the alloy Monel
- Benjamin Strong Jr. (1872–1928), first governor of the Federal Reserve Bank of New York

== Entertainment ==
- Al Anderson (born 1950), guitarist and songwriter, who played with Bob Marley and The Wailers
- Chuck Burgi (born 1952, class of 1970), drummer
- Michael Colleary (class of 1978), film producer, screenwriter and television writer, whose writing credits include Face/Off
- Evan Stephens Hall (born 1989), musician best known as the frontman of the indie rock band Pinegrove
- Daniel Karcher (born 1964), NPR host and filmmaker, best known as host on WBGO and production of The Blair Witch Project and Family Guy
- Nicole Leach (born 1979), actress
- Warren Littlefield (born 1952), former President of NBC Entertainment
- Christina Ricci (born 1980), actress
- Rosemary Rice (1925–2012), actress best known for her role as Katrin on CBS-TV series Mama
- Anwar Robinson (born 1979), American Idol finalist
- Ben Rosenfield (born 1992), actor
- Adam Schlesinger (1967–2020), bassist for the band Fountains of Wayne
- Elaine Stewart (1930–2011), actress and model
- Joe Walsh (born 1947), musician with the Eagles
- Alex Winter (born 1965), actor, best known for his role in Bill & Ted's Excellent Adventure

== Law ==
- Lezli Baskerville (born 1956), lawyer who has served as president and CEO of the National Association for Equal Opportunity in Higher Education

== Politics ==
- Harold L. Colburn Jr. (1925–2012), physician and politician who served in the New Jersey General Assembly representing the 8th Legislative District from 1984 to 1995
- Buddy Fortunato (born 1946), newspaper publisher and politician who served four terms in the New Jersey General Assembly
- Nia H. Gill (born 1948), politician who has represented the 34th Legislative District in the New Jersey Senate since 2002
- Syd Goldsmith (born 1938, class of 1956), writer and diplomat who has been featured in the South China Morning Post
- Garnet Hall, politician who represented the 28th legislative district in the New Jersey General Assembly from 2024 to 2026
- J. Henry Harrison (1878–1943), lawyer and politician who represented Essex County in the New Jersey Senate
- Hsiao Bi-khim (born 1971), politician who is the vice president of Taiwan
- James Wallwork (1930–2024, class of 1948), Republican Party politician who served in both houses of the New Jersey Legislature

== Science and medicine ==
- Buzz Aldrin (born 1930), astronaut who was the second person to step on the Moon
- Wendy Benchley (born 1941, class of 1959), marine and environmental conservation advocate and former elected official who was the wife of the author Peter Benchley
- Virginia Lee Block (1902–1970), psychologist who contributed to studies regarding child and adolescent psychology
- Allen B. DuMont (1901–1965, class of 1919), television pioneer
- Jordan Harrod (born 1996, class of 2014), research scientist and YouTuber who works on neuroengineering, brain-machine interfaces, and machine learning for medicine
- John A. Kenney Jr. (1914–2003), pioneering African-American dermatologist who specialized in the study of skin disorders affecting racial minorities, earning him recognition as the "dean of black dermatology"

== Sports ==
- Josh Hines-Allen (born 1997), outside linebacker for the Jacksonville Jaguars
- Yael Averbuch (born 1986), soccer player
- Me'Lisa Barber (born 1980), sprinter
- Dale Berra (born 1956), infielder who played in Major League Baseball from 1977 to 1987
- Alvin Bowen (born 1983), gridiron football linebacker who played in the NFL for the Jacksonville Jaguars
- Bob Butler (1891–1959, class of 1910), American football tackle who was named to the 1912 College Football All-America Team and was inducted to the College Football Hall of Fame in 1972
- Bill Byrne (1940–2021), American football guard who played professional football for the Philadelphia Eagles
- Clary Anderson (1911–1988), American football and baseball player and coach, who was the head baseball and football coach for Montclair State University
- David Caldwell (born 1987, class of 2005), football safety who played in the NFL for the Indianapolis Colts
- Wally Choice (1932–2018, class of 1952), basketball player who played professionally with the Harlem Globetrotters
- Leonard S. Coleman Jr. (born 1949), last president of the National League, serving from 1994 until 1999 when the position was eliminated by Major League Baseball
- Kyle Copeland (born 1961), former professional tennis player
- Avery Ellis (born 1994), professional Canadian football defensive lineman for the Ottawa Redblacks of the Canadian Football League
- Jesse Grupper (born 1997, class of 2015), Olympic rock climber
- Mule Haas (1903–1974), Major League Baseball centerfielder from 1925 to 1938
- Alen Hadzic (born 1991), épée fencer
- Myisha Hines-Allen (born 1996, class of 2014), professional basketball player who plays for the Washington Mystics of the WNBA
- Aubrey Lewis (1935–2001, class of 1954), football and track star with the Notre Dame Fighting Irish who was selected by The Star-Ledger as its Football Player of the Century
- Jeff Mills (born 1968), linebacker who played four seasons in the NFL with the San Diego Chargers and Denver Broncos
- Mackenzie Molner (born 1988), chess grandmaster and instructor
- Jacquie Pierri (born 1990, class of 2008), ice hockey player who competed as a member of the Italian women's national ice hockey team that participated at the 2026 Winter Olympics
- Harry Rawstrom (1917–1994), All-American collegiate swimmer for Springfield College who was head swimming coach for the University of Delaware from 1946 to 1981
- Patience Sherman (born 1946), former competition swimmer who competed in the 1964 Summer Olympics in Tokyo
- Robert Torrey (1878–1941), football player and coach who was the captain of the University of Pennsylvania's unbeaten teams of 1904 and 1905 and was elected to the College Football Hall of Fame in 1971
- David Tyree (born 1980), wide receiver, played for the New York Giants
- Ingrid Wells (born 1989), soccer player
- Earl Williams (1948–2013), MLB catcher who earned the National League's Rookie of the Year award in 1971

== Writing and journalism ==
- Ernestine Gilbreth Carey (1908–2006), daughter of Frank Bunker Gilbreth and Lillian Moller Gilbreth, and co-author of Cheaper by the Dozen
- Frank Bunker Gilbreth Jr. (1911–2001), son of Frank Bunker Gilbreth and Lillian Moller Gilbreth, and co-author of Cheaper by the Dozen
- Susan Glasser (born 1969), journalist who is a staff writer for The New Yorker
- Alfred Starr Hamilton (1914–2005), poet
- Russ Heath (1926–2018, class of 1945), cartoonist best known for his comic book work with DC Comics
- Julie Kane (born 1952), Poet Laureate of Louisiana, 2011–2013
- Kenneth Lamott (1923–1979, class of 1940), writer
- Anne McCaffrey (1926–2011), author of science fiction and fantasy novels
- John Miller (born 1958), journalist who interviewed Osama bin Laden
- Julia Phillips (born 1989, class of 2006), author whose book Disappearing Earth was a finalist for the 2019 National Book Award for Fiction
- Richard Wilbur (1921–2017, class of 1938), former United States Poet Laureate; won the Pulitzer Prize and National Book Award
