= Albert W. Nickerson =

American railroad executive (1840–1893)

Albert Winslow Nickerson
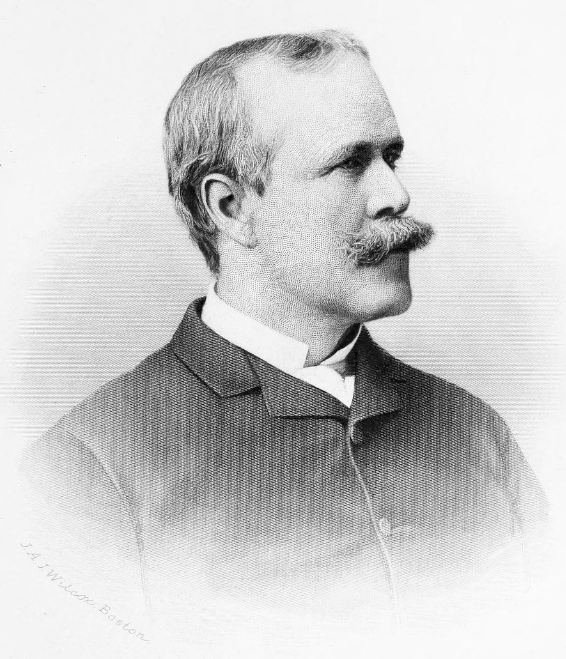
- Born: May 21, 1840; Jamaica Plain, Massachusetts, U.S.
- Died: May 17, 1893 (aged 52); Dedham, Massachusetts, U.S.
- Resting place: Forest Hills Cemetery
- Occupation: Railroad executive
- Spouse: Amelia Frances Lindsay (m. 1876)
- Children: 5
- Relatives: Thomas Nickerson (uncle); Albert Nickerson (grandson)

Signature
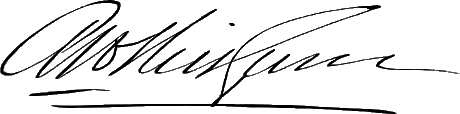

Albert Winslow Nickerson (May 21, 1840 – May 17, 1893) was an American railroad executive and director of both the Atchison, Topeka and Santa Fe Railway and the Mexican Central Railway.

== Personal life ==
Nickerson was born on Perkins Street in Jamaica Plain on May 21, 1840, to Joseph Nickerson, (Note: Joseph Nickerson was born in Barnstable, Massachusetts, on Cape Cod. He went off to sea at 16, and when he was 24 he became captain of his own ship. He later moved to Boston, became a ship chandler, and had a warehouse on Harrison Avenue.) a prosperous Boston businessman. Albert attended the Eliot School in Jamaica Plain and did not attend college. Later in his life, Joseph Nickerson became involved in several railroads and was the president of two. Joseph's brother Thomas Nickerson (1810–1892) also served as a railroad executive, notably as president of the Atchison, Topeka and Santa Fe Railway (ATSF) between 1874 and 1880. In 1880, when Joseph Nickerson died as one of the richest men in Boston, Albert inherited several million dollars and was made a director of the ATSF and the Mexican Central Railway.

Nickerson was married twice. He married Amelia Frances Lindsay on March 1, 1876. He had five children: Albert, Richard, William, Ruth, and Agnes. He was a vestryman at St. Paul's Church, an Episcopal church in Dedham. He was a close friend of President Grover Cleveland. His friendship with the president was a leading cause of Cleveland purchasing Gray Gables, which adjoined Nickerson's "Great Hill" estate in Marion, Massachusetts.

== Career ==
After he inherited his father's stock in 1880, he joined the boards of both the Atchison, Topeka and Santa Fe Railway and the Mexican Central Railway and held them until his death. He was an accomplished businessman in his own right by this time, with an estimated $3 million in holdings. He invested in milling companies in Lawrence, Massachusetts, becoming president of Arlington Mills. Though he could be overbearing, he was known as a good friend to his employees.

Nickerson was a business partner of Levi C. Wade. His net worth was rumored to be between $10 million and $20 million.

== Homes ==
=== Dedham ===
Nickerson lived in Jamaica Plain until 1878 when he purchased the home of a failed Dedham lawyer, Edward S. Rand, near Connecticut Corner in Dedham. He soon became civically involved, running for selectman, and making charitable contributions to causes around town.

Four years after moving to Dedham, he wanted to build a new house on the highest point of land along Common Street. To do so would require moving the street, which the Norfolk County Commission refused to do. Around the same time, the Dedham Board of Assessors dramatically increased his taxes to a level he felt was unfair. Partially as a result of these two setbacks, Nickerson sold the house to his brother George and he moved to an estate on Buzzards Bay in Marion, Massachusetts.

=== Marion ===
In Marion, Nickerson bought a large estate known as "Great Hill," with 40 rooms and seven square miles of forests and winding driveways. He undertook an extensive remodeling of the waterfront home, adding conservatories and stables, and redecorated it with expensive furnishings. It was here that he would host president Grover Cleveland and convinced him to purchase the nearby Gray Gables estate.

=== Riverdale ===
Nickerson quarreled with Marion officials over his taxes as well and, three years before his death, moved back to Dedham. There, he purchased Riverdale, a 600-acre (2.4 km^{2}) estate on the Charles River that was the childhood home of John Lothrop Motley.

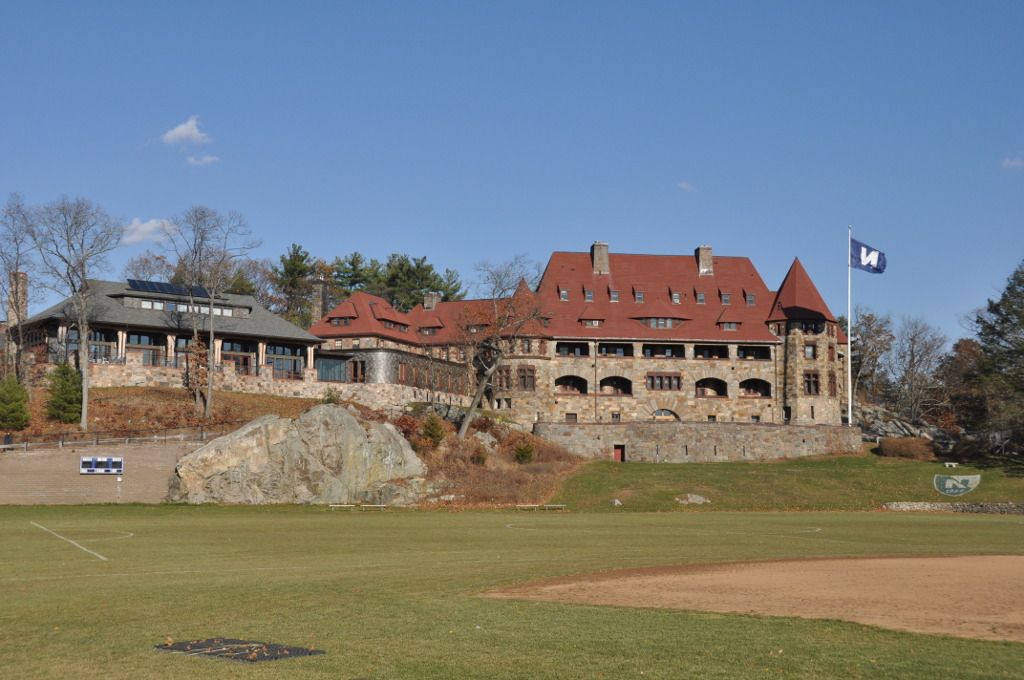
The castle that Nickerson had constructed, now part of the Noble and Greenough School, as seen in 2017

In 1886, he commissioned the architectural firm of Henry Hobson Richardson to build him a castle on the estate and hired Frederick Law Olmsted's firm to do the landscaping. It was constructed by Norcross Brothers. Olmsted determined the exact spot upon a hill for the home, laid out the roads on the property and changed the direction of the road rather than cut down a favored tree. Russell Sturgis called it "one of the best pieces existing of the peculiar Romanesque sculpture of semi-Byzantine character which Mr. Richardson's work introduced to this community."

The castle has a number of interesting architectural elements but its best known is its numerous secret passages and "legendary underground mazes and hallways". At Nickerson's request, Richardson also included a number of unusual features to add both protection and entertainment. Below the study was a wading pool, rifle range, and a dungeon. The escape routes and secret hiding places were presumably added because Nickerson was concerned that people "would try to murder him for his abundant wealth." (Note: Unconfirmed rumors allege that a secret tunnel exists that exits on the other side of the Charles River.)

It was built on top of a rocky hill "so that the Castle and the River appeared magically to carriages or cars arriving through the forested Pine Street entrance." The home cost $300,000 to build and $200,000 to furnish. While the mansion was being built, Nickerson lived in a home on the property that once belonged to Joseph Guild.

== Philanthropy ==
Nickerson was the wealthiest man in Dedham at the time of his death. He was a member of Dedham's St. Paul's Episcopal Church, but donated $10,000 towards the construction costs of St. Mary's Church, a Catholic church in Dedham. He had previously paid off the Catholic parish's US$700 debt. This was welcome news, as the parish was bankrupt at the time. He also contributed $5,000 to the construction of the Dedham Public Library.

== Death and legacy ==
Nickerson died at his home in Dedham on May 17, 1893, of a burst appendix. His funeral at St. Paul's Church attracted a large number of mourners, and special trains were run from Boston to accommodate them all. He was buried at Forest Hills Cemetery.

At his death, Nickerson's fortune was estimated at $10,000,000. (Note: This is the equivalent of $304,564,605 in 2018 dollars.) The Panic of 1893 greatly reduced his fortune, and his family was forced to sell off his 60,000 shares in the Atchison railroad to hold onto their property. They also sold Great Hill. They attempted to hold onto Riverdale, but eventually Nickerson's widow sold the property and moved to Europe. The Noble and Greenough School purchased Riverdale on August 30, 1921, to use as their new campus.

A grandson, Albert Lindsay Nickerson Jr. (1911–1994), became the chairman and CEO of Mobil Oil.

== Works cited ==
- Byrne, William; Leahy, W. A.; Dowling, Austin; Young, E. J. A.; Finen, J. E. (1899). Introductory. The Hurd & Everts co. pp. 323–324.
