= Levi C. Wade =

American politician (1843–1891)

Levi Clifford Wade
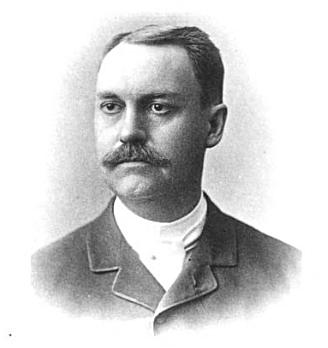
- Wade in 1892 publication

President of the Mexican Central Railroad
- In office 1884–1891
- Preceded by: Thomas Nickerson
- Succeeded by: Stephen W. Reynolds

Speaker of the Massachusetts House of Representatives
- In office 1879–1879
- Preceded by: John Davis Long
- Succeeded by: Charles J. Noyes

Member of the Massachusetts House of Representatives
- In office 1876–1879

Personal details
- Born: January 16, 1843 Allegheny City, Pennsylvania, U.S.
- Died: March 21, 1891 (aged 48) Oak Hill, Newton, Massachusetts, U.S.
- Resting place: Newton Cemetery, Newton, Massachusetts, U.S.
- Party: Republican
- Spouse: Margaret A. Rogers (m. 1869)
- Children: 6
- Education: Yale College (A.B.)
- Profession: Lawyer, politician, railroad executive

Levi Clifford Wade (January 16, 1843 – March 21, 1891) was a lawyer, politician and railroad executive who served as a member, and the Speaker of, the Massachusetts House of Representatives in 1879, and as the president of the Mexican Central Railway from 1884 until he died in 1891.

== Early life ==
Levi Clifford Wade was born on January 16, 1843, in Allegheny City, Pennsylvania, to Levi Wade and A. Annie Wade (née Rogers). He was educated at local schools until the age of 13 when he was privately tutored.

At the age of 16, he entered Lewisburg University to study law. He entered Yale College at the age of 19 in 1862 and became an editor of the Yale Literary Magazine. Wade graduated from Yale College in 1866 with a Bachelor of Arts. After Yale, he went to the Newton Theological Institution in October 1866 and studied exegesis under Horatio Balch Hackett and theology under Alvah Hovey.

== Family life ==
Wade married Margaret A. Rogers of Bath, Maine, on November 16, 1869. Together, they had four sons (Arthur, William, Levi, and Robert) and two daughters who died in infancy.

They lived in a small house in Newton Upper Falls from 1869 to 1881. After, they moved to a 225-acre estate called "Homewood" in Oak Hill, Newton, Massachusetts.

== Career ==
=== Early career ===
From 1868 to 1873, Wade taught at a grammar school in Newton Upper Falls in Newton, Massachusetts, while studying law.

=== Legal career ===
Wade was admitted to the bar in 1873, and entered the law office of I.W. Richardson. Wade practiced law in Boston, Massachusetts, first as a solo practitioner in 1875, then in 1877 until May 1, 1880, in partnership with future Governor John Q. A. Brackett.

=== State legislature ===
In 1876, Wade was elected to the Massachusetts General Court and served until 1879. In 1879, he was selected as the speaker of the Massachusetts House of Representatives.

=== Career in the railroad industry ===
On May 1, 1880, Wade took up railway law. He was one of the four original projectors and owners of the Mexican Central Railway. He became counsel of the Mexican Central Railway, Atchison, Topeka, & Santa Fe Railway, Atlantic & Pacific Railroad, and the Sonora Railroad. Wade served as the President of the Mexican Central Railway from August 1884 until his death. He was a business partner of Albert W. Nickerson.

He also served as the director of the Mexican Central Railway, Sonora Railroad, Cincinnati, Sandusky, & Cleveland Railroad, the Atlantic & Pacific Railroad, and the Theological Library in Boston. He served on the water board of Newton.

== Illness and death ==
On March 21, 1891, after a lingering illness of only a few weeks, Wade died at his "Homewood" residence at Oak Hill. He was interred at Newton Cemetery.

== See also ==
- 100th Massachusetts General Court (1879)

== Notes ==
Massachusetts House of Representatives
Preceded by John Davis Long	Speaker of the Massachusetts House of Representatives; 1879	Succeeded by Charles J. Noyes
Business positions
Preceded by Thomas Nickerson	President of the Mexican Central Railway; 1884-1891	Succeeded by Stephen W. Reynolds
