= Thomas Nickerson (railroad executive) =

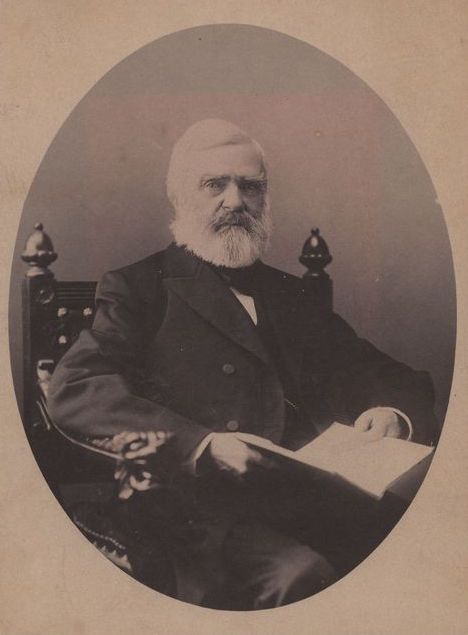
- Born: September 19, 1810; Brewster, Massachusetts, U.S.
- Died: July 24, 1892 (aged 81); Newton Center, Massachusetts, U.S.
- Occupation: Railroad executive
- Spouse: Sylvina (d. 1891)
- Relatives: Albert W. Nickerson (nephew)

Thomas Nickerson (September 19, 1810 – July 24, 1892) was an American railroad executive. He served as the eighth president of the Atchison, Topeka and Santa Fe Railway (ATSF), between 1874 and 1880. He was also president of the Atlantic and Pacific Railroad.

== Biography ==
Nickerson was born in Brewster, Massachusetts, on September 19, 1810. His family was well known for the number of sailors it had produced, and Thomas himself also sailed for nearly 30 years before he turned to land transportation.

Nickerson invested in the ATSF around 1870, becoming the railroad's vice president in May 1873. The next year, he was promoted to president of the ATSF, succeeding Henry Strong, where he served until 1880. Thomas Nickerson's brother Joseph also served as a railroad executive, and Joseph's son Albert W. Nickerson inherited several million dollars upon his father's death and was made a director of the ATSF and the Mexican Central Railway.

Nickerson didn't limit himself to just the ATSF. He was also a prominent figure in the Atlantic and Pacific Railroad, Sonora Railway, California Southern Railroad and Mexican Central Railway, all subsidiary companies of the ATSF.

Nickerson died in Newton Center, Massachusetts, on July 24, 1892. His wife had died the year prior; he was survived by three children. The town of Nickerson, Kansas, founded in 1872, is named in his honor.

== Sources ==
- Gleed, Charles S (February 1893). "The Atchison Topeka & Santa Fe". The Cosmopolitan.
- Serpico, Philip C. (1988). Santa Fé Route to the Pacific. Palmdale, California: Omni Publications. pp. 18–24. ISBN 0-88418-000-X.
- Waters, Lawrence Leslie (1950). Steel Trails to Santa Fe. University of Kansas Press, Lawrence, Kansas.

Business positions
| Preceded by Henry Strong | President of the Atchison, Topeka and Santa Fe Railway; 1874 – 1880 | Succeeded by T. Jefferson Coolidge |
| Preceded by Benjamin Kimball | President of the California Southern Railroad; 1880 – 1885 | Succeeded by George B. Wilbur |
| Preceded by Position established | President of the Mexican Central Railway; 1880-August 4, 1884 | Succeeded by Levi C. Wade |
