= Noble and Greenough School =

Prep school in Dedham, Massachusetts, US

Coordinates: 42°15′40″N 71°11′08″W

Location
- 10 Campus Drive; Dedham, Massachusetts 02026; United States

Information
- Type: Private, day & boarding, college-prep
- Motto: Spes Sibi Quisque —Virgil in the Aeneid ("Each person finds hope within himself or herself.")
- Established: 1866; 160 years ago
- Founder: George Washington Copp Noble
- Headmistress: Catherine J. Hall
- Faculty: 134
- Grades: 7–12
- Enrollment: 631
- Campus type: Suburban
- Colors: Navy and white
- Athletics conference: Independent School League
- Mascot: Bulldog
- Newspaper: The Nobleman
- Annual tuition: $62,600 For Day Students $68,600 For 5-Day Boarding
- Website: nobles.edu

The Noble and Greenough School, commonly known as Nobles, is a coeducational, nonsectarian day and five-day boarding school in Dedham, Massachusetts, a suburb of Boston. It educates 638 boys and girls in grades 7–12. The school's 187-acre (0.76 km^{2}) campus borders the Charles River.

== History ==
=== Founding and move to Dedham ===
In 1866, Washington University in St. Louis Latin professor George Washington Copp Noble returned to Boston and founded Noble's Classical School as an all-boys college-preparatory school. He renamed the school to Noble & Greenough School in 1892, when his son-in-law James Greenough joined the faculty. The school was originally a for-profit entity run by the Noble family, but in 1913, after Greenough's death, a coalition of Nobles alumni purchased the school from Noble and reorganized the school as a nonprofit corporation under the control of a board of trustees.

Nobles historically drew most of its students from "the fashionable families of Greater Boston"; sociologist Digby Baltzell called it "Proper Boston's most exclusive day school." The school primarily catered to members of the Episcopal Church; a 1954 alumnus recalled that when he was at Nobles, there were only two non-Episcopalian students. (A Unitarian, John Richardson '04, served as president of the Nobles board from 1921 to 1964.)

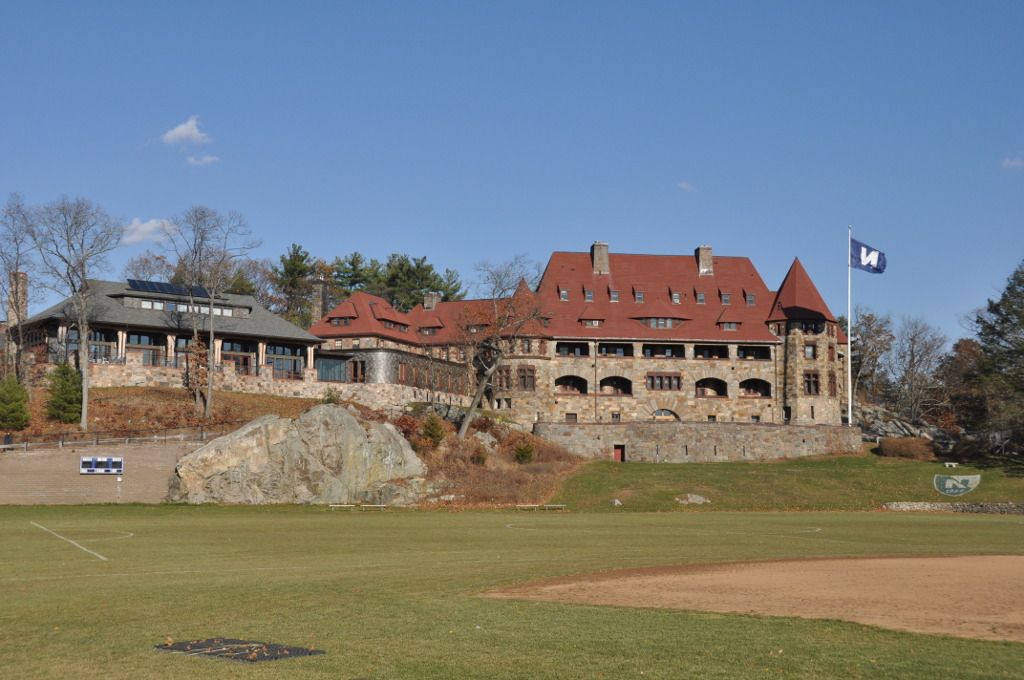
Nobles' dining hall, colloquially called the Castle, in 2017

In its early days, Nobles cycled through a series of buildings in Boston. In 1922, at the peak of the country day school movement, the school moved to suburban Dedham, where it has remained ever since. (In the 1920s, Nobles, Roxbury Latin, and Belmont Hill all set up campuses in the Boston suburbs.) The property had previously been the estate of Albert W. Nickerson, a Nobles grandparent, who had commissioned Frederick Law Olmsted to lay out the site. Nickerson's Richardsonian Romanesque mansion, popularly dubbed "the Castle," now serves as the school's dining hall.

In 1926, shortly after moving to Dedham, Nobles discontinued its primary school program. In response, a coalition of Nobles parents (including Joseph Kennedy Sr.) started the Dexter School. One of the Nobles elementary school students who transferred to Dexter was third-grader John F. Kennedy.

=== Predecessors ===
Nobles is descended from various Boston college-preparatory day schools, all of which primarily prepared students for the Harvard College entrance examinations. The curriculum of these schools was primarily classical, as until 1887, Harvard required applicants to study both Latin and Greek. Moreover, even after 1887, Harvard still required applicants to demonstrate either "an elementary working knowledge" of Latin and Greek, or advanced preparation in mathematics or natural sciences. According to James Greenough, in practice, only students "especially adapted to the study of mathematics and natural science" could get into Harvard without studying the classics.

In the nineteenth century, most public high schools lacked the resources to employ a classics teacher. By contrast, classically oriented private schools like Nobles and its predecessors were very successful at preparing students to pass Harvard's entrance exams.

- In 1851, Boston Latin School headmaster Epes Sargent Dixwell resigned from BLS to found Dixwell's Private Latin School. From 1846 to 1870, Dixwell's and Nobles supplied 12% of Harvard undergraduates, more than every other Boston-area private day school combined.
- Dixwell retired in 1872 and was succeeded by John Prentiss Hopkinson, who renamed the school Hopkinson School. Hopkinson was the brother-in-law of Harvard president Charles Eliot, and from 1870 to 1895, Hopkinson's was Harvard's third-largest feeder school, with 331 students. Other Hopkinson's teachers included Arthur Volkmann and James Greenough.
- Hopkinson's lieutenant Arthur Volkmann started the Volkmann School in 1895. From 1906 to 1915, Nobles and Volkmann's were Harvard's fourth- and tenth-largest feeder schools, with 232 and 133 students; if combined, they would have been the second-largest, behind Boston Latin and ahead of Phillips Exeter. Nobles and Volkmann's merged in 1917 due to declining enrollment at Volkmann's; amidst anti-German sentiment in the United States during World War I, newspapers had falsely accused the Prussian-born Volkmann of being a German spy.

Nobles claims the history and alumni of Volkmann School. In 1966, Volkmann's alumni erected a monument to their alma mater on the Nobles campus. However, Nobles does not claim Dixwell's 1851 foundation date.

=== Recent years ===
Nobles began admitting black students in 1964 and girls in 1974. The school had initially attempted to merge with Winsor School, an all-girls prep school in Boston, but negotiations were unsuccessful.

In 2017, Harvard's student newspaper reported that Nobles was Harvard's fourth-largest feeder school, behind Boston Latin School, Phillips Academy, and Stuyvesant High School. From 2019 to 2023, the school sent 52 students (out of roughly 650) to Harvard. Many of these students come through Nobles' athletic programs. In the 2020–21 school year, Nobles was the single largest contributor to the Harvard Crimson varsity teams, with 15 students on Harvard rosters. 14 of these 15 students were on the lacrosse, ice hockey, and rowing teams. Nobles' athletic programs contribute to other universities as well; in 2024, Nobles was the Princeton Tigers' leading feeder school, with 11 students, and one of only seven schools with more than five alumni on Princeton varsity teams.

From 2013 to 2018, Nobles conducted a $137 million fundraising campaign, which increased the school's endowment by $60 million and raised funds to build a new library and renovate the Castle.

Nobles has had only seven heads of school in over 150 years. In 2017, Catherine J. Hall became Nobles' first female Head of School. During her tenure, the percentage of self-identified students of color increased from 35% in the 2018–19 school year to 49% in the 2023–24 school year. The percentage of students on financial aid increased from 28% to 30% during the same timeframe.

=== List of Heads of School ===
	Heads of School	Tenure	Events/Biography
1.	George Washington Copp Noble	1866–1919	Founder of the school; served until his death
2.	Charles Wiggins II	1920–1943	School relocates to Dedham, Massachusetts. Lower School discontinued.
3.	Eliot T. Putnam	1943–1971	Son-in-law of Charles Wiggins
4.	Edward "Ted" S. Gleason	1971–1987	School begins to admit girls
5.	Richard "Dick" H. Baker	1987–2000	
6.	Robert P. Henderson '76	2000–2017	Oversaw the building of the MAC, arts center, new library, renovation of Baker, castle remodel, and more.
7.	Catherine J. Hall	2017–present	Oversees the renovation of the Shattuck Schoolhouse, the renovation of the McLeod Recreational and Parking Space, and more.

== Admissions and student body ==
Student body composition (2021–22)
Race and ethnicity	Nobles	Massachusetts
White	63.9%	69.6%
Asian	12.9%	7.7%
Black	9.3%	9.5%
Hispanic	4.7%	13.1%
Multiracial	9.2%	2.7%

Nobles is primarily a day high school, although it operates a middle school for 110 students and a five-day boarding program for 50 students. The school enrolled 638 students in the 2023–24 school year, 49% of whom identified as students of color, and 30% of whom were on financial aid.

Nobles had a 16% admission rate in 2023. Students are primarily admitted in the seventh and ninth grades (55 and 65 incoming students per year, respectively). In the 2023–24 school year, 39% of Nobles students came from public schools, 8% from charter or parochial schools, and 53% from private schools.

== Finances ==
=== Tuition and financial aid ===
In the 2023–24 school year, Nobles charged 5-day boarding students $68,600 and day students $62,600.

Nobles provides need-based financial aid and commits to meet 100% of each admitted student's demonstrated financial need. In the 2023–24 school year, 30% of students were on financial aid, and the average aid grant was $44,935 (75% of day student tuition).

=== Endowment and expenses ===
In its Internal Revenue Service filings for the 2021–22 school year, Nobles reported total assets of $328.0 million, net assets of $270.6 million, investment holdings of $191.7 million, and cash holdings of $22.8 million. Nobles also reported $46.2 million in program service expenses and $9.1 million in grants (primarily student financial aid).

== Athletics ==
Nobles competes in the Independent School League, a group of day and boarding schools in Greater Boston. The school's website says that 74 Nobles teams have won ISL championships and that as of the 2023–24 school year, 87% of the varsity teams "have had a winning record in the past 10 years." In the 2014–15 school year, eight Nobles alumnae were on the Harvard women's hockey team.

Nobles sponsors competition in the following sports:

Fall athletic offerings

- Pickleball
- Cross country
- Field hockey (girls)
- Football (boys)
- Soccer
- Volleyball (girls)

Winter athletic offerings

- Skiing
- Basketball
- Ice hockey
- Squash
- Wrestling

Spring athletic offerings

- Baseball (boys)
- Rowing
- Golf
- Lacrosse
- Softball (girls)
- Tennis
- Track and field
- Ultimate Frisbee

=== Rivalries ===
Nobles' primary athletic rival was initially Volkmann's. After the two schools merged and Nobles left Boston for Dedham, the rivalry shifted to Milton Academy, located in the nearby suburb of Milton. In contrast to Nobles' Episcopalian base, Milton historically educated Boston's Unitarian elite, giving a religious edge to the rivalry. The rivalry predates the move to Dedham, as the two schools began playing football in 1886; as such, Nobles-Milton is the nation's fifth-oldest high school football rivalry. However, Nobles did not beat Milton until 1932, after the move to Dedham.

Nobles also counts Roxbury Latin School as a secondary rival.

Since neither Milton nor Roxbury Latin sponsor rowing, Nobles' primary crew rival is Groton School, a matchup dating back to 1922.

=== Notable athletes ===
==== Ice hockey ====
- Bill Arnold, class of 2010
- Callahan Burke, class of 2015
- John Cronin (Boston University)
- Mark Fayne, class of 2006
- Jimmy Hayes, class of 2008
- Kevin Hayes, class of 2010
- Sarah Parsons, class of 2005 (U.S. Olympic Team bronze medalist)
- Helen Resor, class of 2004 (U.S. Olympic Team bronze medalist)
- Karen Thatcher, class of 2002 (U.S. Olympic Team silver medalist)
- Colin White, class of 2016
- Miles Wood, class of 2015
- Jayden Struble, class of 2019

==== Other ====
- Chris Cleary, class of 1998 (soccer)
- Caroline Ducharme, class of 2021 (basketball)
- Drew Kendall, class of 2021 (football)
- Ben Rice, class of 2017 (baseball)
- Courtney Sims, class of 2003 (basketball)
- Warren Cummings Smith, class of 2011 (skiing; 2014 Winter Olympics participant)
- Chris Tierney, class of 2004 (soccer)
- Dan Weinstein, class of 1999 (speedskating; 2001 World Champion, 5000m relay)

== Notable alumni ==
=== Noble and Greenough ===
- Justin Alfond, class of 1994, president of the Maine State Senate
- Ben Rice, class of 2018, Baseball Player for the New York Yankees
- Arthur Everett Austin Jr., director of the Wadsworth Atheneum
- Michael Beach, class of 1982, actor featured in ER, Third Watch
- Ayla Brown, class of 2006, singer and daughter of Massachusetts Senator Scott Brown
- Richard Clarke Cabot, medical researcher; discoverer of the Cabot ring
- Michael Jude Christodal, class of 1986, recording artist, songwriter
- William Henry Claflin Jr., archaeologist and hockey coach; co-founder of Belmont Hill School
- Harry Crosby, founder of the Black Sun Press
- Grafton D. Cushing, lieutenant governor of Massachusetts
- Michael Deland, class of 1959, U.S. Environmental Protection Agency regional administrator; oversaw the cleanup of Boston Harbor
- Caroline Ducharme, basketball player
- Robert Dunham, American actor
- Harry J. Elam Jr., class of 1974, president of Occidental College
- Keith Elam, member of Gang Starr, aka Guru
- Selden Edwards, class of 1959, best-selling novelist
- Richard P. Freeman, class of 1888, U.S. Representative
- Seth Goldman, class of 1983, Co-Founder, President and CEO of Honest Tea
- Wycliffe Grousbeck, class of 1979, co-owner of the Boston Celtics
- Tucker Halpern, class of 2009, member of the Grammy-nominated DJ duo Sofi Tukker
- Kevin Hayden, class of 1986, Suffolk County district attorney
- Reginald Heber Howe, class of 1894, first headmaster of Belmont Hill School
- Melvin Johnson, class of 1927, weapons designer, Harvard professor
- Jonathan Kozol, class of 1954, education writer and activist
- Timothy Leland, class of 1956, investigative journalist; founder of the Boston Globe Spotlight team
- Mr. Lif, rapper
- Clarence Cook Little, class of 1906, biologist and president of University of Michigan
- Royal Little, class of 1915, founder of Fortune 500 company Textron and "father of conglomerates"
- A. Lawrence Lowell, class of 1873, president of Harvard University (1909–1933)
- Guy Lowell, class of 1888, architect, notably the Boston Museum of Fine Arts and the New York County Courthouse
- Percival Lowell, class of 1872, astronomer
- Francis Peabody Magoun, World War I ace and scholar of languages and literature
- Philip Ainsworth Means, anthropologist, historian and author
- Samuel Eliot Morison, class of 1901, American historian and author
- Woolson Morse
- Albert Nickerson, class of 1929, former chief executive of Mobil Oil and chairman of the Federal Reserve Bank of New York
- William Phillips, class of 1896, United States diplomat
- Roger Putnam, American politician and businessman
- Alexander H. Rice Jr., class of 1894, physician and explorer of South America
- John Richardson Jr., class of 1939, United States Assistant Secretary of State for Educational and Cultural Affairs
- Leverett Saltonstall, class of 1910, governor of Massachusetts (1939–1945) and United States Senator (1945–1967)
- Francis Sargent, class of 1935, governor of Massachusetts (1969–1975)
- Henry Lee Shattuck, class of 1897, attorney, philanthropist and politician
- Mayo A. Shattuck III, class of 1972, American businessman, CEO of Constellation Energy
- Louis Agassiz Shaw, inventor of the iron lung, Harvard professor
- Robert Storer, former Harvard University football player and decorated war hero
- James J. Storrow, class of 1881, president of General Motors and the Boy Scouts of America, namesake of Storrow Drive
- Richard Clipston Sturgis, class of 1877, Boston architect
- William Davis Taylor, class of 1927, publisher of the Boston Globe
- J. Rupert Thompson, class of 1986, reality television show producer
- George Clapp Vaillant, anthropologist and author
- James N. Wood, class of 1959, former president and CEO of the J. Paul Getty Trust
- Harry F. Stimpson Jr., lawyer and ambassador

=== Volkmann's ===
- Ralph Lowell, class of 1907, founder of WGBH Radio
- George Minot, class of 1904, Nobel Prize-winning medical researcher
- Edward Pearson Warner, U.S. Assistant Secretary of the Navy (AIR); co-founder of the International Civil Aviation Organization

== See also ==
- History of education in Dedham, Massachusetts
