= Albert Nickerson =

American businessman

- Born: Albert Lindsay Nickerson Jr. January 17, 1911; Dedham, Massachusetts
- Died: August 7, 1994 (aged 83); Cambridge, Massachusetts
- Education: Harvard University (BSc '33)
- Spouse: Elizabeth Perkins (m. 1936)
- Relatives: Albert W. Nickerson (grandfather)

Chairman of Mobil
- In office November 1, 1961 – September 1, 1969
- Preceded by: Fred W. Bartlett
- Succeeded by: Rawleigh Warner Jr. (Chairman and CEO)

CEO of Mobil
- In office 1958 – September 1, 1969
- Preceded by: Brewster Jennings
- Succeeded by: Rawleigh Warner Jr. (Chairman and CEO)

President of Mobil
- In office 1955 – November 1, 1961
- Preceded by: Brewster Jennings
- Succeeded by: Herbert Willetts

Albert Lindsay Nickerson Jr. (January 17, 1911 – August 7, 1994) was an American business executive. He served as the chairman and CEO of Mobil Oil, and chair of the Federal Reserve Bank of New York from 1969 to 1971.

== Biography ==
Nickerson was born in Dedham, Massachusetts, on January 17, 1911, to Albert Lindsay Nickerson and Christine Nickerson (née Atkinson). In 1929, Nickerson graduated from the Noble and Greenough School, the main building of which had been constructed as the residence of his grandfather Albert W. Nickerson. He graduated from Harvard University in 1933 with a Bachelor of Science degree.

=== Business career ===
Nickerson began working at a Socony (later Mobil) gasoline station in 1933. He became station manager in 1934 and salesman in 1936. In 1943, during World War II, Nickerson was the director of the placement bureau of the War Manpower Commission.

At Socony, Nickerson eventually rose to become the company's president in 1955, replacing Brewster Jennings. He stayed as president until November 1, 1961, when he was succeeded by Herbert Willetts. He then served as CEO from 1958 to November 1, 1961, and CEO and chairman from November 1, 1961, to 1969 when the company changed its name to Mobil.

Nickerson served as chairman of the Business Council from 1967 to 1968. He also served as director of the Federal Reserve Bank of New York from 1961 to 1966 and its chairman from 1969 to 1971. Nickerson served on the board of trustees of the Rockefeller University, the Boston Symphony Orchestra, and the American Museum of Natural History. He also was on the Harvard Board of Overseers from 1959 to 1965. He was also a member of the Council on Foreign Relations.

=== Personal life ===
Nickerson married Elizabeth Perkins on June 13, 1936; they had four children: Christine, Albert, Elizabeth and Victoria. Nickerson was awarded the gold medal by the American Petroleum Institute in 1973. He was given an honorary Doctor of Law by Hofstra University on June 7, 1964. Nickerson died on August 7, 1994, in Cambridge, Massachusetts.
