= Rawleigh Warner Jr. =

American businessman

- Born: February 13, 1921; Chicago, Illinois, U.S.
- Died: June 26, 2013 (aged 92); Hobe Sound, Florida, U.S.
- Education: Princeton University (A.B.)
- Occupation: Business executive
- Title: President of Mobil (1965–1969); Chairman and CEO of Mobil (1969–1986)
- Spouse: Mary Ann deClairmont (m. 1946)
- Children: 2

Chairman and CEO of Mobil
- In office September 1, 1969 – February 1, 1986
- Preceded by: Albert Nickerson
- Succeeded by: Allen E. Murray

President of Mobil
- In office January 1, 1965 – September 1, 1969
- Preceded by: Herbert Willetts
- Succeeded by: William Tavoulareas

Rawleigh Warner Jr. (February 13, 1921 – June 26, 2013) was an American business executive, who was president of Mobil from 1965 to 1969 and chairman and chief executive officer from 1969 to 1986. He was recipient of the 1984 Henry Laurence Gantt Medal.

== Early life ==
Rawleigh Warner Jr. was born February 13, 1921, in Chicago, Illinois, to Rawleigh Warner and Dorothy Haskins Warner. He grew up in the northern parts of Chicago (Evanston and Winnetka).

He attended Lake Forest Academy and graduated from the Lawrenceville School. He graduated with a Bachelor of Arts in economics from Princeton University in 1943; completing his senior thesis titled "Labor Problems in the Petroleum Industry: With Special Reference to the Pure Oil Company".

== Career ==
=== Military service ===
He served in the United States Army during World War II as a Field Artillery officer with the 10th Mountain Division in Italy. During his military service he was awarded the Silver Star, the Bronze Star Medal, and the Purple Heart. He left the army as a captain in 1946.

=== Oil business ===
After a brief stint in finance, Warner was looking for a new career in 1948. As his father Rawleigh Warner Sr. was chairman of Pure Oil, the oil business seemed like a natural fit. Wishing to avoid the appearance of nepotism, Warner followed his father's advice and joined the financial staff of Continental Oil Company in Houston, Texas. Warner served as the assistant to the treasurer and remained with Continental until 1953.

In 1953, Warner was recruited to join Socony-Vacuum Oil Company as the assistant to the vice president of finance in one of the company's divisions based in Fort Lee, New Jersey. He later transferred to the parent company as its economics department manager. Later he managed Socony's Middle East department and was elected regional vice president of Mobil International Oil Company, one of Socony's divisions, in 1964. After only twelve years working for Socony, Warner was elected president of the renamed Socony Mobil Oil Company on January 1, 1965, replacing Herbert Willetts. In his second year as president, the company again changed its name to Mobil and modernized its logo from a red Pegasus to the word "Mobil" in blue letters with a red letter "O". On September 1, 1969, Warner was elected chairman and CEO of Mobil, replacing Albert Nickerson.

He is attributed as leading Mobil's corporate sponsorship. Warner helped start Mobil's sponsorship of PBS's Masterpiece Theatre, a relationship that spanned from the 1970s to 2004. He is also noted for working with his Vice President of Public Affairs Herbert Schmertz to publish weekly paid Op-Eds under Mobil's name in national newspapers in the 1970s and 1980s, including the New York Times. He retired on February 1, 1986.

== Other efforts ==
Warner was heavily involved with Princeton University, including serving as a trustee of Princeton University from 1968 to 1972 and being a member of the Resources Committee from 1981 to 1996. He was also a trustee of Barnard College, Lawrenceville School, and the Woodrow Wilson International Center for Scholars. He was one of the original trustees of the Kennedy Center.

He was chairman of the American Petroleum Institute. He was appointed by President Reagan to the newly formed President's Committee on the Arts and Humanities in 1982.

== Personal life ==
Warner married Mary Ann deClairmont in 1946 and together they had two daughters, Alison and Suzanne.

He was a devoted golf player.

== Later life ==
Warner died in Hobe Sound, Florida, on June 26, 2013, from complications of inclusion body myositis.

== Awards and honors ==
Warner received the following awards and honors throughout his life:

- Henry Laurence Gantt Medal, American Society of Mechanical Engineers, March 1984
- Honorary degree from Princeton University, 1984
- Honorary degree from Marietta College
- Honorary degree from Pace University
- Gold Medal Award, American Petroleum Institute
