= Monterey and Mexican Gulf Railroad =

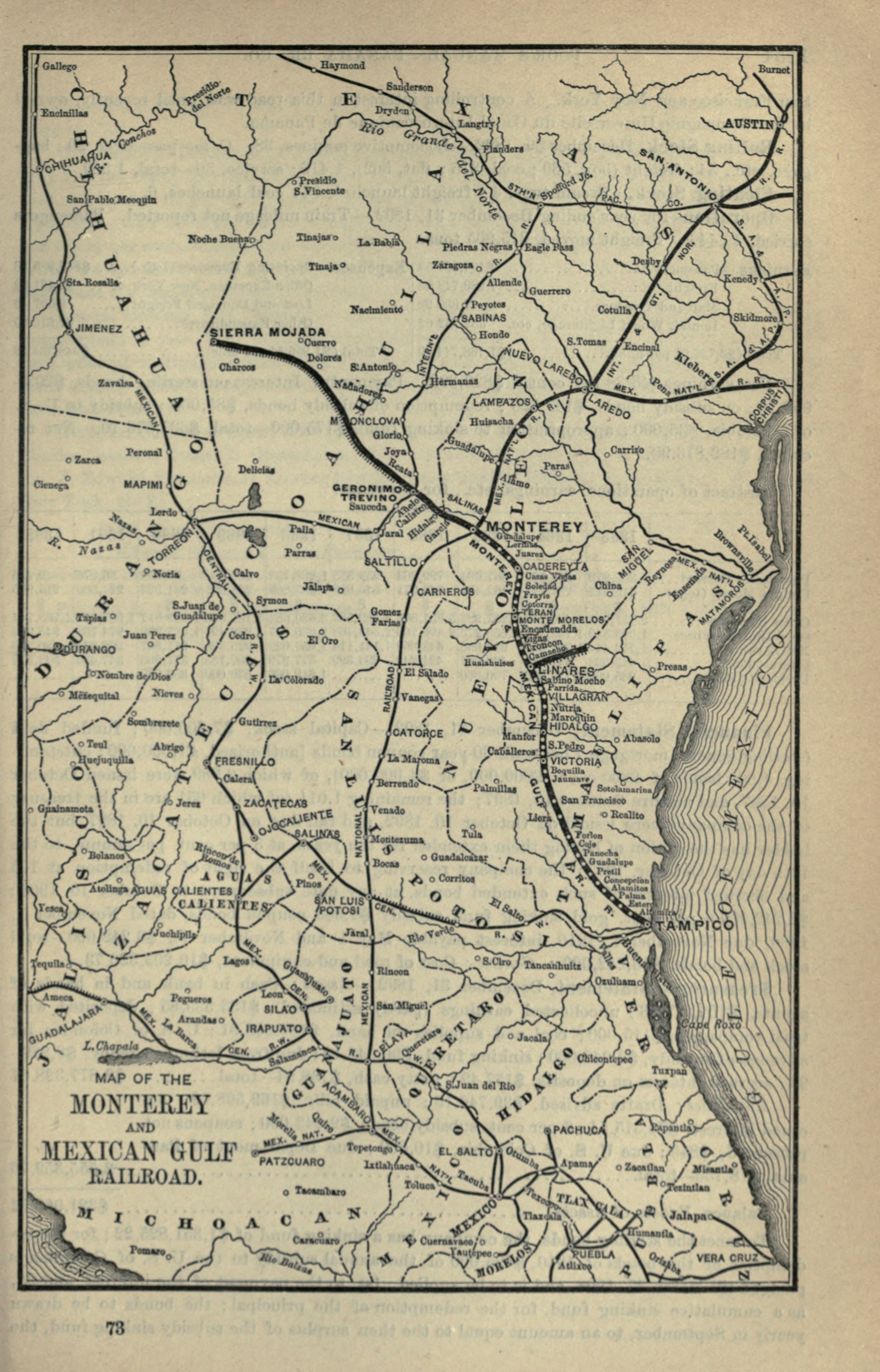
Monterey and Mexican Gulf Railroad in 1893

The Monterey and Mexican Gulf Railroad was a railroad in Mexico that the Mexican Central Railway acquired control over in June 1901.

The Railroad was established as a company in New York City on September 5, 1888. In the 1890s the railroad was said to be in a better financial position than its competitors and stood to make large profits once oil exploitation in the Gulf of Mexico began.
