= Chris Cleary =

American soccer player (born 1979)

Personal information
- Full name: Christopher Martin Cleary
- Date of birth: August 2, 1979 (age 47)
- Place of birth: Washington, D.C., U.S.
- Height: 6 ft 0 in (1.83 m)
- Positions: Midfielder; forward

Youth career
- 1998–2001: Boston College

Senior career*
Years	Team	Apps	(Gls)
2002–2004	Karlsruher SC		
2004	Barnsley		
2004–2005	Worksop Town		
- * Club domestic league appearances and goals

Chris Cleary (born August 2, 1979) is an American retired soccer player who played as a midfielder or forward and spent his career in Europe. His career was cut short due to multiple ankle injuries.

== High school ==
Cleary was born in Washington, D.C. The second of four siblings, he grew up in Milton, Massachusetts where he began high school at Catholic Memorial High School, later transferring to Noble and Greenough School. A member of the Massachusetts Olympic Development Teams from ages 13–19 and playing youth football for Charles River United and F.C. Greater Boston Bolts, Cleary managed to win five state titles and three Regional Championships, and was named Tournament MVP three times. Cleary was also named to the All-Conference Team in high school three times, twice named to the All-State Team and twice named to the All-Region Team. He finished his high school career with over 110 points. Cleary was also an All-Conference basketball and baseball player in his senior year of high school and had been recruited to play all three sports in college.

== College ==
Cleary played college soccer at Boston College from 1998 to 2001 for Ed Kelly. He was a Big East All-Conference selection and Regional All-American his senior season and the recipient of the Tom McElroy Scholarship. Cleary started all but four games in his four seasons in Chestnut Hill, playing primarily as an outside winger. During his junior year, Boston College won the Big East tournament over Manfred Schellscheidt's Seton Hall University squad. Cleary finished his collegiate career ranking in Boston College's top 10 in both total points and assists.

== Professional ==
After completing his collegiate career, Cleary moved to Germany where he signed with Second Division club Karlsruher SC. After two years on the books with KSC Cleary's agent, Bernd Wulffen, was in negotiations with Eintracht Frankfurt following a successful 4 day trial period. As a result, in 2004, Cleary moved to England and signed a non-contract with Barnsley FC, but soon left for Worksop Town FC with Assistant Manager, Ronnie Glavin and four other players. Cleary was rumored to be making a move to Sheffield Wednesday F.C. or Doncaster Rovers F.C. after his performances in his team's FA Cup games. (Cleary managed six goals and one assist in three games). He retired in 2005 after suffering another ankle injury necessitating two major operations. He has since returned to the United States.

=== FA Cup hat-trick ===
On October 6, 2004, Cleary became the first American to ever score a hat-trick in the FA Cup. Worksop Town FC defeated Droylesden FC 3–2 in front of 4,500 fans.

=== Agent ===
In May 2008 Cleary's agent from 2002 to 2004, Bernd Wulffen, was arrested by Interpol in Cape Town, South Africa on charges of fraud and theft. Wulffen was said to have represented a number of other American and German soccer and handball players while attempting to start an exchange program.
