= William Tavoulareas =

American businessman (died 1996)

William Peter Tavoulareas
- Born: November 9, 1919; Brooklyn, New York, U.S.
- Died: January 13, 1996 (aged 76); Boca Raton, Florida, U.S.
- Education: St. John's University (LLB)
- Occupation: Business executive
- Title: President of Mobil (1969–1984)
- Spouse: Adele
- Children: 3

President of Mobil
- In office September 1, 1969 – November 1, 1984
- Preceded by: Rawleigh Warner Jr.
- Succeeded by: Allen E. Murray

William Peter Tavoulareas (November 9, 1919 – January 13, 1996) was a Greek-American petroleum businessman who served as President and Chief Executive of the Mobil Corporation in the 1970s and 1980s. He was best known for his libel lawsuit against The Washington Post, responding to the newspaper's investigative journalism articles criticizing him.

== Early life and education ==
Tavoulareas was the son of Greek and Italian immigrants, and was born in Brooklyn, New York. He earned a Bachelor of Laws degree from St. John's University School of Law.

== Career ==
Tavoulareas started as an accountant at Mobil (then Socony-Vacuum) in 1947. He held a series of financial positions until he was elected director of Mobil Oil Corp in 1965. On September 1, 1969, he succeeded Rawleigh Warner, Jr. as President of Mobil. He was elected director in 1976 and remained as president until November 1, 1984, when he was succeeded by Allen E. Murray. He remained on the board of directors until 1988. He had close ties to Sheikh Ahmed Zaki Yamani, and in his time as president, he helped Mobil grow from a revenue of $7.6 billion in 1969 to nearly $70 billion when he retired.

He was also on the Boards of Aramco, Bankers Trust, Philip Morris, St. John's University, Georgetown University, Athens College, St. Francis Hospital, a Governor of New York Hospital, and served on the Boards of numerous charities both nationally and internationally. He was a Knight of the Sovereign Military Order of Malta.

=== Atlas Maritime Company ===
In 1982, Tavoulareas was unsuccessful in bringing a $2 million libel suit against The Washington Post for a November 30, 1979, front page story by Patrick Tyler saying he used his corporate position at Mobil to "set up his son" (Peter Tavoulareas) with a multi-million dollar management services contract with his shipping business, Atlas Maritime Company. The initial jury's award of $2 million in favor of William Tavoulareas in July 1982 was put aside by the judge hearing the case, Oliver Gasch, on May 3, 1983, because he said Tavoulareas had not proven "actual malice". The three-judge panel of the Court of Appeals upheld the verdict, 2–1. The full U.S. Court of Appeals for the D.C. Circuit, including Judges Kenneth Starr, George MacKinnon, and Ruth Bader Ginsburg, upheld the ruling in March 1987, finding the story substantially true and holding that "the record abounds with uncontradicted evidence of nepotism in favor of Peter [Tavoulareas' son]" and "insufficient evidence exists in the record to support a finding of constitutional malice".

The U.S. Securities and Exchange Commission (SEC) opened an investigation of the business relationship between William Tavoulareas and Peter Tavoulareas in 1977, at the urging of U.S. Representative John Dingell. SEC investigators presented their findings in a draft memorandum in December 1980. The report stated that William Tavoulareas "participated in decisions" and was involved with Atlas "from approximately January 1974 through at least February 1976". Stanley Sporkin, the departing director of enforcement at the SEC in 1981, stated he negotiated with Mobil's lawyers that there would be no punitive action against Mobil or its president, if they disclosed some of the findings. Ultimately, in July 1981, the SEC commissioners rejected the disclosure agreement set up by Sporkin. SEC Commissioner Philip A. Loomis Jr. argued that the SEC did not have authority to order Mobil to disclose that information. Representative Dingell and the House Committee on Energy and Commerce held hearings in February 1982 on the SEC's handling of the investigation of Tavoulareas, which included interviewing Sporkin. William Tavoulareas declined an invitation to those hearings, citing the ongoing lawsuit with The Washington Post.

== Personal life ==
He married Adele. He had three children: Peter, William, and Patrice. He was known by his friends as "Tav".

He was a close friend of U.S. President George H. W. Bush and Greek Prime Minister Andreas Papandreou.

== Death ==
He died on January 13, 1996, at the age of 75 at Boca Raton Regional Hospital in Boca Raton, Florida, where he lived in his later years.
