= Virginia Lee Block =

American psychologist

Virginia Lee Block (July 4, 1902 – September 14, 1970), also known as VL Block, was an American psychologist who contributed to studies regarding child and adolescent psychology. Block worked as a professor at San Francisco State University, which now offers a scholarship in Block's name to be awarded to students studying to become counselors.

== Early life ==
Block was born in New Jersey on July 4, 1902. Raised in Montclair, New Jersey, she graduated from Montclair High School and earned an undergraduate degree from the New Jersey College for Women. She attended Stanford University and Columbia University in the early 1920s.

== Career ==
Following her graduation, Block was placed at the head of a Child Guidance Clinic in Seattle, Washington. When she worked at the Child Guidance Clinic, Block also served as a special consultant at the University of Washington for students enrolled in the Counseling and Guidance Training Institute.

During this time, Block also contributed as a member of the Soroptimist organization, a club which focuses on empowering women.

== Scholarly contributions and notable works ==
Block contributed to many published works, including books such as Student questionnaire, with manual of directions and Kefauver-Hand guidance tests and inventories, and journal articles such as "Conflicts of adolescents with their mothers" and "Can we vitalize English?" Each of these contributed to the fields of adolescent, child, and education psychology.
