= Daniel Karcher =

American film producer

Daniel Karcher (born 1964) is an on-air broadcast announcer and film designer, best known as host for WBGO and his efforts on production of The Blair Witch Project and Family Guy.

Karcher grew up in Montclair, New Jersey, where he graduated from Montclair High School as part of the class of 1983. Twenty five years later he established The Amphitheater Foundation, an alumni and scholarship foundation that has since reunited thousands of Montclair High School alumni.

Karcher relocated to England as a teenager. His first professional broadcasting experience was at Radio BHN in Birmingham, England where he hosted a pre-formatted Top-40 show called "American Heart Beat".

Returning to the US, Karcher pursued a career in aviation, when at the same time hosted jazz and classical programs at Princeton University's WPRB in Princeton, New Jersey. Following the closure of the charter service he flew for, Karcher became employed as an announcer at WBGO, where he has been part of the on-air team since 1997, a public radio station that airs classic jazz and NPR programs with studios in Newark, New Jersey and transmitted from Times Square in New York City.

As a film designer, by circumstance Karcher was also a member of the team that created the social media campaign that created hype for the 1999 film The Blair Witch Project. That campaign was dubbed "Best Ever Social Media Campaign" by Forbes Magazine. Karcher is also the producer of "Woods Movie - Behind the Scenes of Making The Blair Witch Project," as well as contributing editor to AMC's "Movies that Shook the World" and National Geographic's "The 90's: The Last Great Decade?" both of which featured The Blair Witch Project.

Since 1999, Karcher has worked on over thirty motion pictures, primarily for Haxan Films and Lionsgate Films, having also contributed to lifelong childhood friend Alex Winter's 2013 release Downloaded. In 2008, Karcher co-developed and appeared in Four Corners of Fear, a 2013 spoof of The Blair Witch Project created by the original film's co-producer Eduardo Sanchez along with co-producers and actors Joshua Leonard and Michael C. Williams.

In addition, Karcher is known for his work on the television comedy Family Guy, having produced and directed the DVD release of "Take Alex to Work Day, Behind the Scenes at Family Guy," which shadows an entire day with Alex Borstein, producer, writer and voice of Lois Griffin and several other characters in the process of creating an episode.
