= George V. Holton =

American lawyer (1890–1972)

- Born: March 29, 1890; Jersey City, New Jersey
- Died: December 10, 1972 (aged 82); Hanover, New Hampshire
- Education: Montclair High School ('08); Cornell University (LLB '11)
- Spouse(s): Frances Ricks Osborne (m. 1920; div. 1956) Elizabeth Davis Berry (m. 1958)

George Van Syckle Holton (March 29, 1890 – December 10, 1972) was an American lawyer and businessman who served from 1948 to 1955 as chairman of the board of the Socony-Vacuum Oil Company (the former name of the Mobil Oil Corporation). After graduating from Cornell University in 1911, Holton practiced law in Rochester, New York. In 1921 he became associated with the Vacuum Oil Company, and in 1923 became the company's assistant counsel. Holton became Vacuum's secretary in 1925, general counsel in 1930, and a director in 1931.

Upon the merger of Vacuum and the Standard Oil Company of New York in 1931 to form Socony-Vacuum, Holton was elected associate general counsel. A year later, he became general counsel, a director, and a member of the executive committee. In 1938 he was appointed a vice-president. In March 1948, Holton was elected chairman of the board. He remained in office until his retirement in 1955. Holton died in 1972 at age 82.

== Biography ==
=== Family and early life ===
George Van Syckle Holton was born on March 29, 1890 in Jersey City to John Newton Holton (1858–1931) and Mary Deborah Bonnell (1862–1917). He attended Montclair High School and graduated in 1908. In the fall of 1908, he entered Cornell University, where he graduated Bachelor of Laws in 1911. While at Cornell, Holton became a member of Sigma Chi and Phi Delta Phi.

=== Career ===
Upon graduation, Holton began his legal career in Rochester, New York with the firm Hubbell, Taylor, Goodwin & Moser. At some point in the 1910s he opened a private practice.

In 1918, Holton was commissioned a second lieutenant in the Field Artillery. He served that year at the United States Army Field Artillery School at Fort Sill in Oklahoma.

Following the war, he returned to private practice. In 1921 he became associated with John E. Wellington, who was general counsel of the Vacuum Oil Company. In 1923, Holton became assistant counsel of Vacuum, and in 1925 became company secretary. In 1930 Holton became Vacuum's general counsel, and in 1931 was elected a director.

In the summer of 1931, Vacuum undertook a merger with the Standard Oil Company of New York. When the board of the newly-formed Socony-Vacuum Oil Company met for the first time on July 31, 1931, Peter M. Speer, formerly general counsel for Socony, was elected general counsel, while Holton was elected associate general counsel. In 1932, Holton became general counsel, was elected a director, and became a member of the executive committee. In 1938 he was appointed a vice-president.

On March 31, 1948, Holton was elected chairman of Socony-Vacuum, succeeding Harold Frank Sheets, who had been chairman since 1944. Holton was succeeded as general counsel by Austin T. Foster.

On Friday, July 1, 1955, Holton retired as chairman of Socony. He was succeeded by Brewster Jennings, who had been president since 1944.

=== Personal life ===
On December 30, 1919, Holton married Frances Ricks Osborne (1895–1975) at her parents' home in Charlotte, North Carolina. The Holtons had two daughters, Mary [Beane] (1921–2007) and Anne [Bushman] (1923–2019). From 1940 to 1956, the Holtons lived at 636 Lake Avenue in Greenwich, Connecticut. In 1956, George and Frances divorced. Following the divorce, Holton moved to Woodstock, Vermont, where he remained for the duration of his life. On July 7, 1958 at St. James Episcopal Church in Woodstock, Holton remarried to Elizabeth Davis Berry (1906–2006). Elizabeth was the daughter of New York lawyer John Kirkman Berry (1874–1927) and Elizabeth Davis (1879–1969), the latter of whom was the niece of senator and vice presidential candidate Henry G. Davis. Elizabeth had received a divorce from her first husband, Rogers Cleveland Dunn (1902–1985), in March 1958.

Holton was a member of the Recess Club, Maidstone Club, Field Club of Greenwich, and the Round Hill Club. He was a Republican. Holton was a Congregationalist, though after his marriage to Elizabeth in 1958, attended the Episcopal Church.

Holton died of heart failure on December 10, 1972 at age 82 at the Mary Hitchcock Memorial Hospital in Hanover, New Hampshire. He was interred in Mount Hebron Cemetery in Montclair, New Jersey.
