= Mobil Oil Corporation =

American petroleum brand owned by ExxonMobil

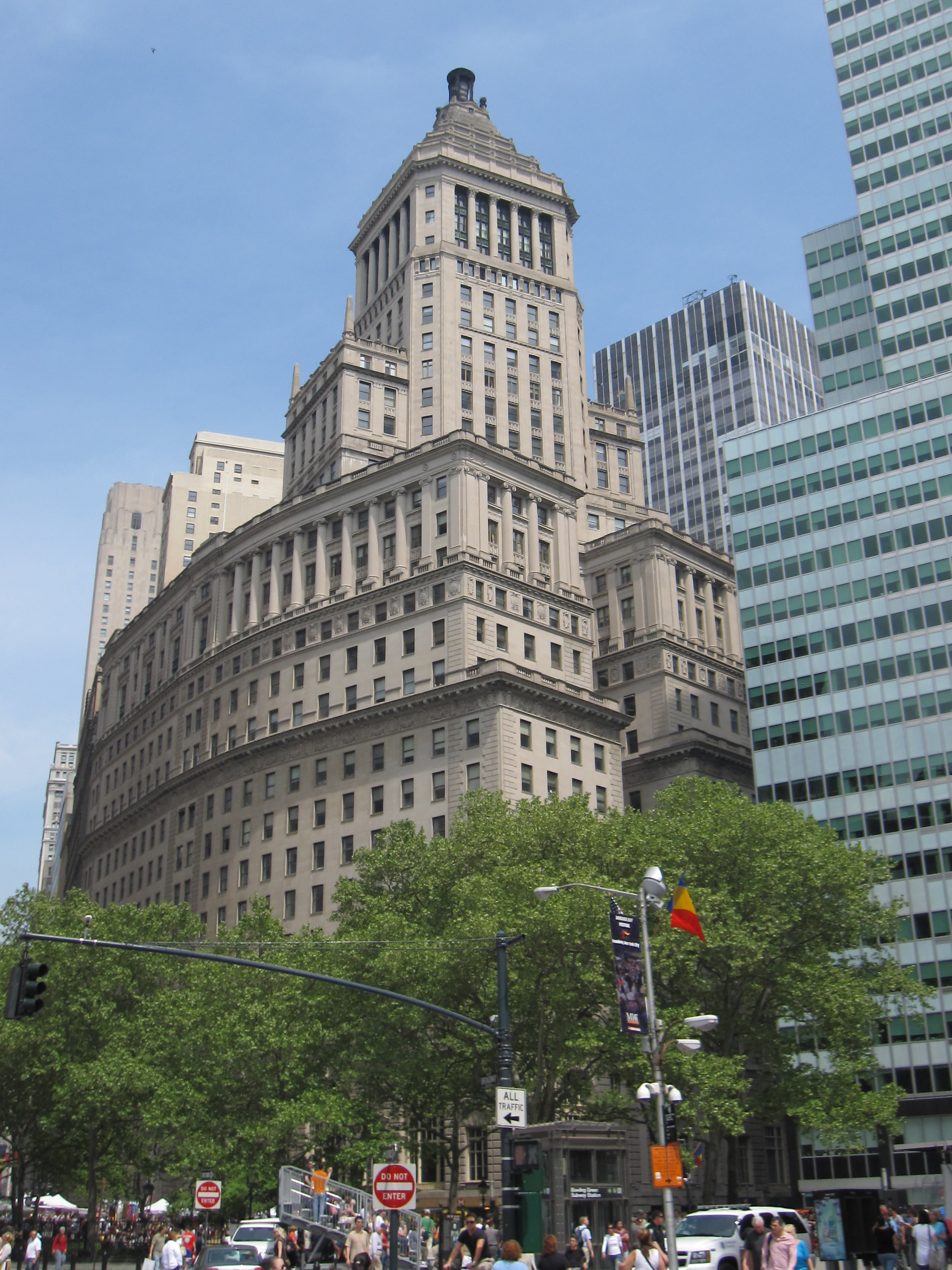
- The Standard Oil Building, 26 Broadway
- Formerly: Standard Oil Company of New York (1892–31); Socony-Vacuum (1931–55); Socony Mobil (1955–66); Mobil Oil Corp. (1966–99)
- Type: Division
- Traded as: NYSE: MOB; S&P 500 component (until 1999)
- Industry: petroleum industry
- Founded: August 10, 1892
- Founder: Charles Pratt
- Defunct: November 30, 1999; 26 years ago (as a company)
- Fate: Merged with Exxon, remaining as a brand
- Successor: ExxonMobil
- Headquarters: Socony-Mobil Building, New York City, New York, U.S.
- Area served: Worldwide
- Products: Gasoline, convenience store Some locations: Car wash, repair shop
- Brands: Mobilgas; Mobiloil; Mobilubricant
- Parent: ExxonMobil Corporation
- Subsidiaries: Magnolia (1925–59); Standard Vacuum Oil Co. (1933–62)
- Website: mobil.com

Mobil Oil Corporation is a petroleum brand owned and operated by American oil and gas corporation ExxonMobil, formerly known as Exxon, which took its name after it and Mobil merged in 1999.

A direct descendant of Standard Oil, Mobil was originally known as the Standard Oil Company of New York (shortened to Socony) after Standard Oil was split into 43 different entities in a 1911 Supreme Court decision. Socony merged with Vacuum Oil Company, from which the Mobil name first originated, in 1931 and subsequently renamed itself to "Socony-Vacuum Oil Company". Over time, Mobil became the company's primary identity, which prompted a renaming in 1955 to the "Socony Mobil Oil Company", and then in 1966 to the "Mobil Oil Corporation". Mobil credits itself as the first company to produce aviation fuel, the first company to introduce paying at the pump at its gas stations, as well as the first company to introduce a mobile payment device, called Speedpass.

In 1998, Mobil announced it was merging with Exxon to form ExxonMobil, reuniting the two largest descendants of Standard Oil. The technicalities of the merger, which was completed on November 30, 1999, showed that Exxon bought Mobil, and Mobil shareholders received a payment of stock in Exxon. Mobil continues as a brand name within the combined company, as well as still being a gas station sometimes paired with its own store or On the Run. Mobil's brand name is primarily used to market motor oils, such as Mobil 1. The former Mobil headquarters in Fairfax County, Virginia, was used as ExxonMobil's downstream headquarters until 2015 when ExxonMobil consolidated employees into a new corporate campus in Spring, Texas.

== Brands ==
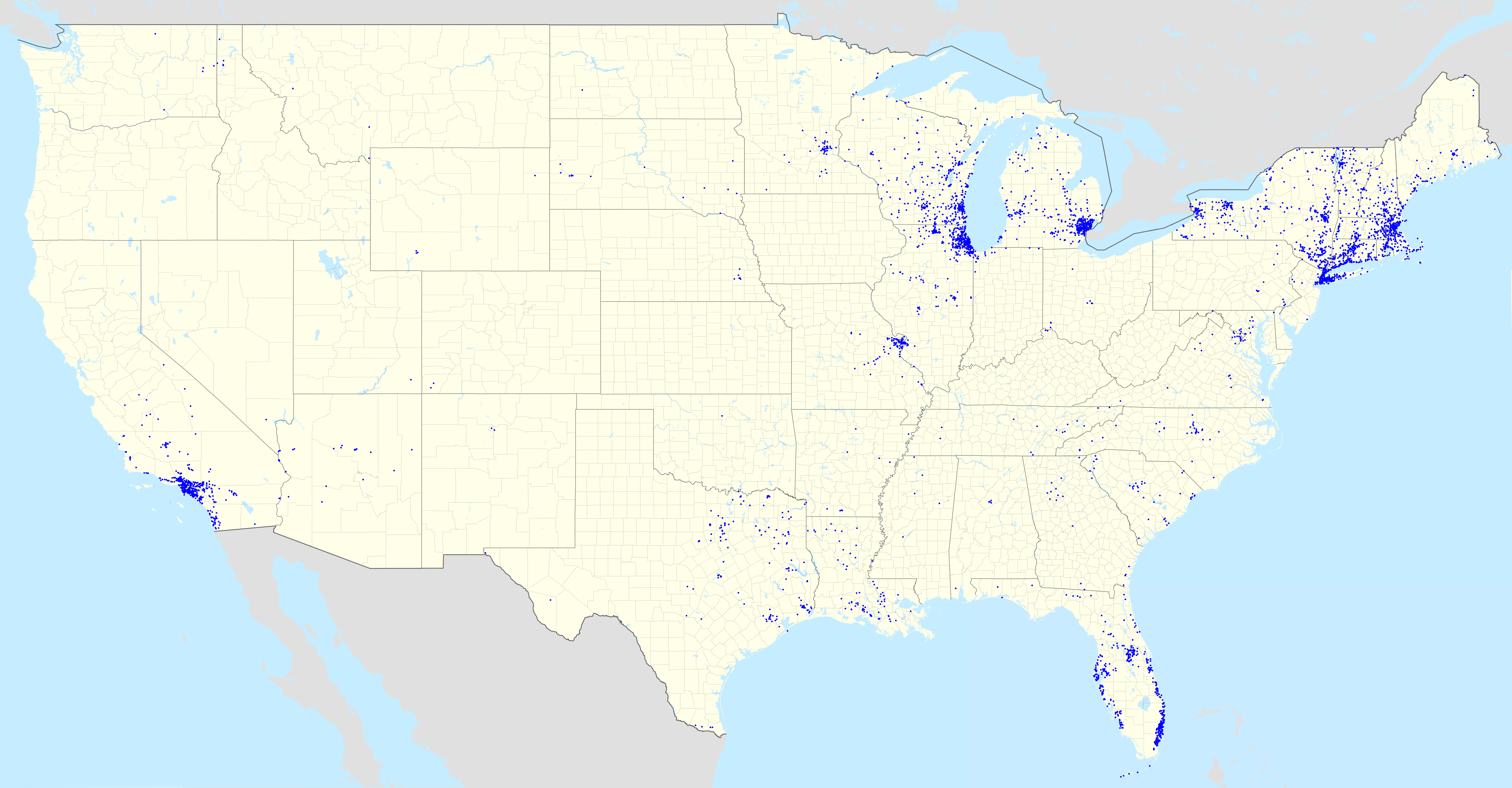
Map of Mobil stores in the continental United States (2012)

Mobil continues to operate as a major brandname of ExxonMobil within the ExxonMobil Fuels, Lubricants & Specialties division. Many of its products feature the Mobil symbol of a red winged horse, Pegasus, which has been a company trademark since its affiliation with Magnolia Petroleum Company in the 1930s.

The Mobil brand now mainly covers a wide range of automotive, industrial, aviation and marine lubricants. For historic reasons, the Mobil brand is still used by Mobil service stations and for fuel (gasoline, diesel, heating oil, kerosene, aviation fuels and marine fuel) products.

There are four main Mobil sub-brands:

=== Mobil Gasoline ===
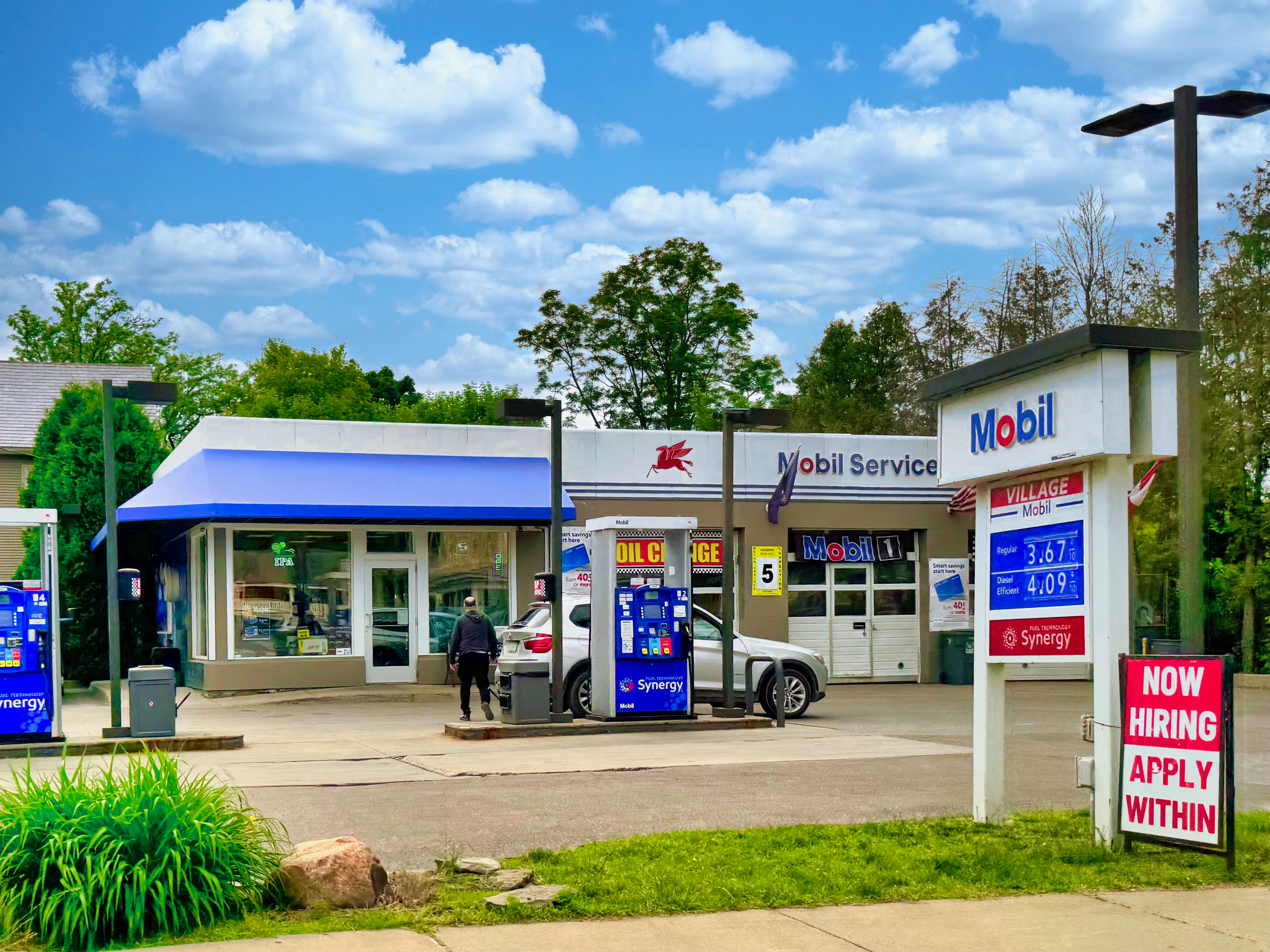
Mobil gas station located in Shelburne, Vermont (2024)

Mobil is ExxonMobil's primary retail gasoline brand in California, Florida, New York, New England, the Great Lakes and the Midwest. The Mobil brand is also used to market gasoline in Australia, Canada (since 2017), Colombia, Egypt, Guam, Japan (until 2019), Malaysia (until 2012), Mexico (starting about first quarter of 2018), New Zealand, Nigeria, Puerto Rico (since 2022) and Guyana (since 2024).

The Mobil brand has a significant market presence in the following metropolitan areas:

- New York metropolitan area (including New Jersey since 2014)
- Detroit
- Chicago
- Los Angeles
- Minneapolis-St. Paul
- Boston
- Buffalo
- St. Louis
- Tampa-St. Petersburg
- Miami-Fort Lauderdale
- Rochester-Syracuse
- Orlando
- Milwaukee
- Providence
- Albany
- Hartford

Mobil stores have made an increased presence in Arizona. Growing in size in the Phoenix area from fewer than 5 stations to over 20 in the mid-2010s, but in recent years the number of stations dwindled down back to 5. Mobil previously had a greater presence in the Phoenix area up until April 2009, when ExxonMobil sold 43 area stores to Alimentation Couche-Tard, parent company of Circle K, as part of a sale of the larger On the Run franchise. The stores were rebranded to Circle K, ending Mobil's presence in the Phoenix area until the mid-2010s. At the time, the closest Mobil locations were in Tonopah and Wickenburg, Arizona, both of which were unaffected by the sale as both locations were not On the Run franchises.

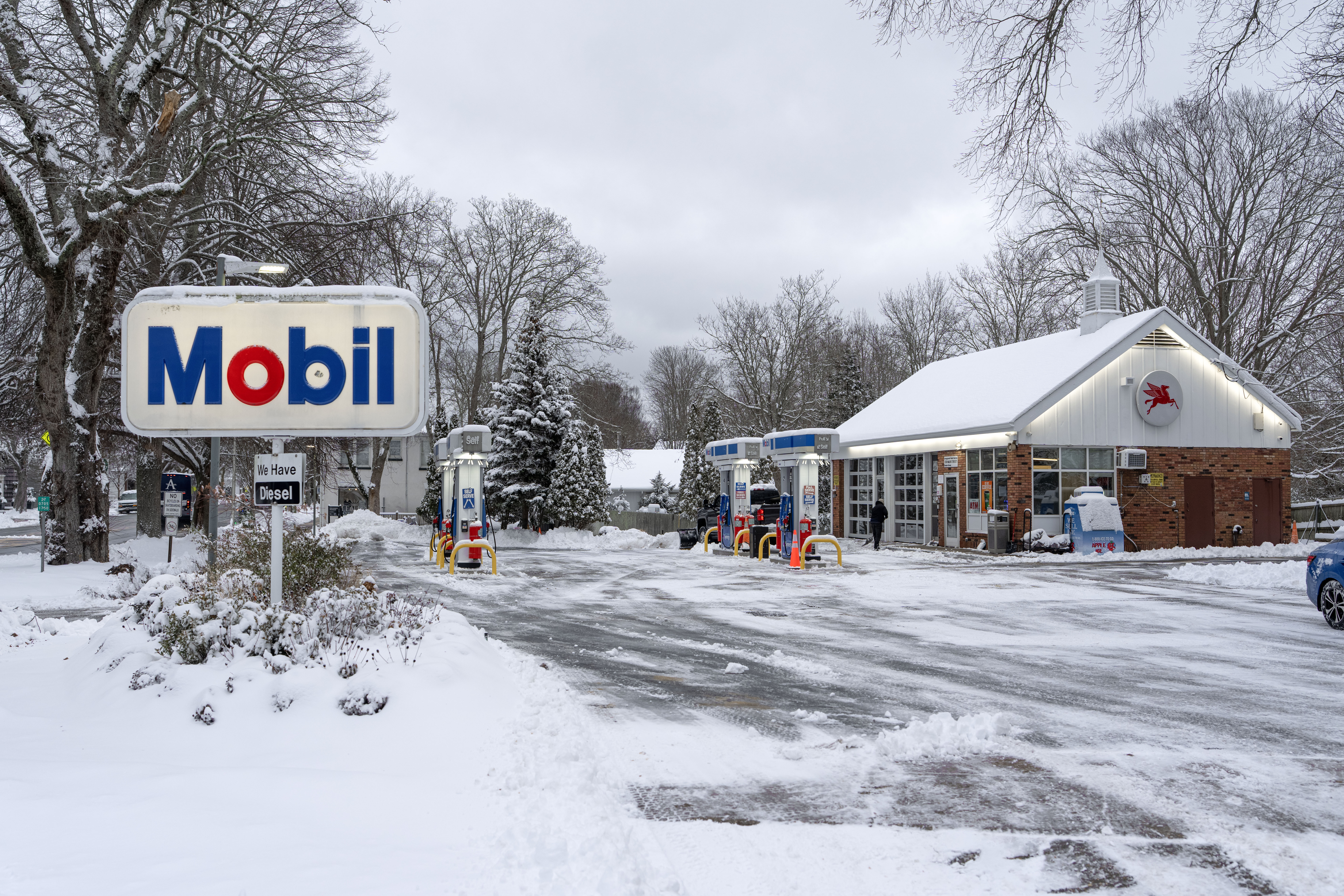
Mobil gas station located in Amagansett, New York (2025)

Also in the 2010s, Mobil stores have made an increased presence in Colorado, particularly in the Denver area, and in areas of northwest Oregon, southwest Washington, and northern California.

Exxon is the primary brand in the rest of the United States, with the highest concentration of Exxon retail outlets located in New Jersey (both Exxon and Mobil brands are used from 2014), Pennsylvania, Texas (Mobil has a sizeable number of stations in Dallas and Houston), Louisiana (mainly New Orleans as well as Baton Rouge) and in the Mid-Atlantic and Southeastern states. Esso is ExxonMobil's primary gasoline brand worldwide. Both the Esso and Mobil brands are used in Canada (since 2017), Colombia, Egypt, and formerly Japan and Malaysia, in which the latter were rebranded as Petron in 2013, and ENEOS for the former in 2019, separately. In Esso stations in Hong Kong and Singapore, the Mobil brand is used on fuel tanks, along with Esso.

=== Mobil 1 ===
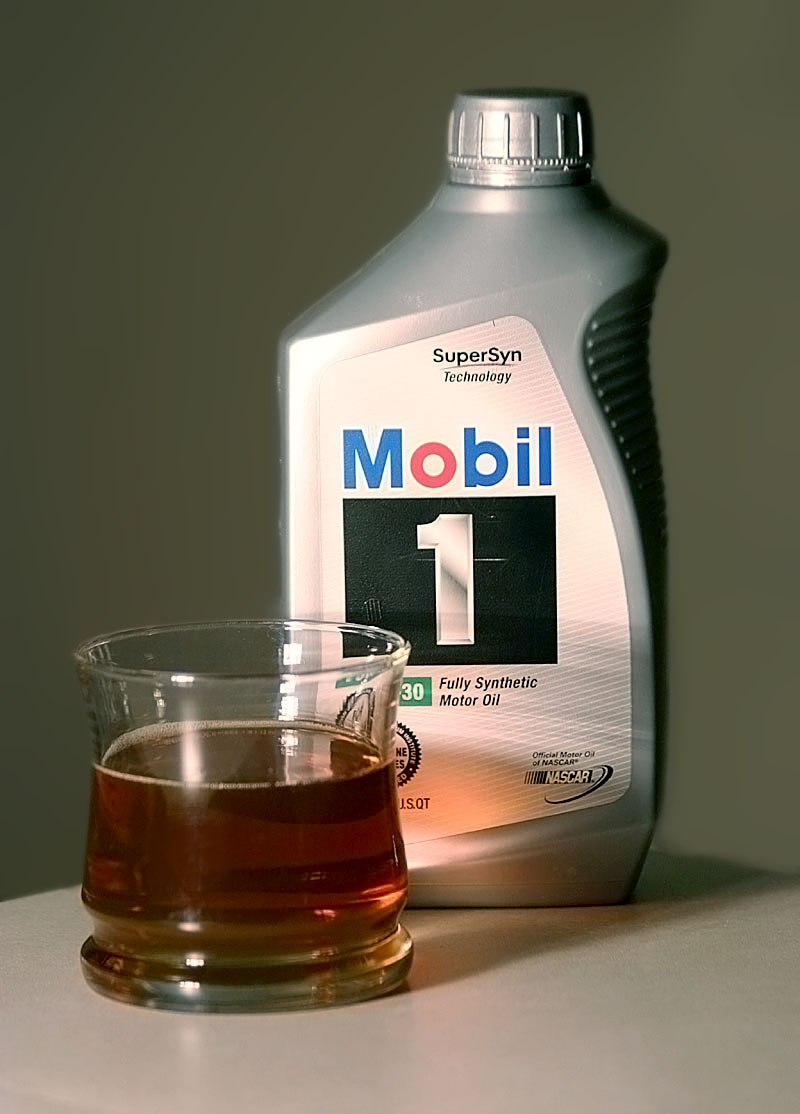
Mobil 1 motoroil bottle (2006)

Mobil 1, the successor to the Mobiloil brand, is a brand name of Exxon/ESSO Mobil. It was introduced in 1974 as a Multi-grade 5W20 viscosity synthetic motor oil. The brand now includes multi-grade motor oils, oil filters, synthetic grease, transmission fluids, and gear lubricants. The Esso and Exxon motor oil brands have largely been discontinued.

=== Mobil Delvac ===
Mobil Delvac (from 'Diesel Engine Lubricant Vacuum') is a range of heavy-duty lubricants designed for commercial vehicles. The range includes engine oils, transmission fluids, drivetrain lubricants and various greases.

=== Mobil Industrial ===
Mobil Industrial is a sub-brand of ExxonMobil for marketing oils and greases used in industrial applications. The main product lines are Mobil SHC synthetic oils and Mobil Grease greases.

=== On the Run Convenience Stores ===
Mobil expanded the sale of convenience store items first pioneered at its discount gasoline stations under the Mobil Mart brand. Mobil continued to refine and enhance its convenience store offerings with the On the Run, which proved to be much more popular. In 2009, 450 On-the-Run brand stores in the United States was sold to Alimentation Couche-Tard, operator of the Circle K convenience store chain. Some other On the Run locations in the United States were sold to 7-Eleven in 2011, which were rebranded as 7-Eleven stores. The franchise locations in Canada were sold to Parkland Corporation in 2016. ExxonMobil continues to own the On the Run stores outside of the US and Canada.

== Former brands ==
=== Discount gasoline stations ===
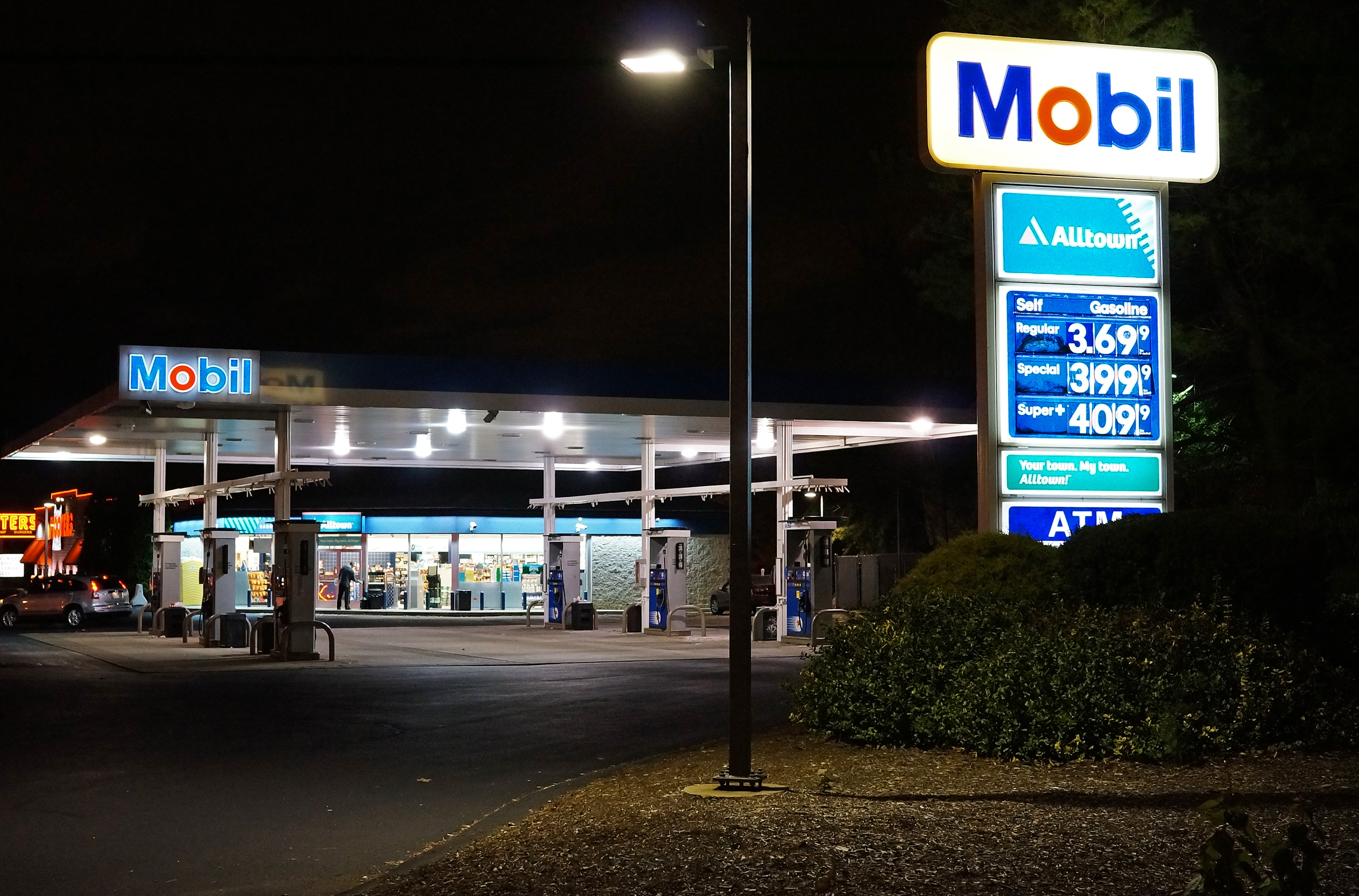
Mobil gas station Route 1, Saugus, Massachusetts (2012)

Mobil rebranded numerous stations to the Hi-Val, Reelo and Sello discount gasoline brands after major price increases following the 1970s oil crisis made a significant number of consumers extremely price conscious. The stations were converted Mobil stations selling convenience store items in the station lobby, while the service bays were rented to customers for do-it-yourself auto repairs. These brands were discontinued in the 1980s, after the gasoline market had recovered.

=== Mobil Travel Guide ===
The Mobil Guide was an annual book of hotel and restaurant recommendations based on a system developed by Mobil in 1958. It rated businesses from one to five stars according to their assessed quality. In October 2009, ExxonMobil licensed the brand to Forbes magazine, which retitled the guide's various designations, e.g., Forbes Travel Guide, Forbes Five Stars, and so on. Forbes launched revised versions of various guides in late 2009.

=== Mobil Technology Company ===
The Mobil name was used by many different and compartmentalized companies, which all preferred to do business with each other. Examples are: "Mobil Exploration and Producing Technical Center" (MEPTEC), "Mobil Research and Development Corporation" (MRDC), "Mobil Technology Company" (MTC). The advanced technology research and development tended to occur in the MTC, for example Mobil's Floating LNG Plant was developed by MTC prior to May 1998, and MAK Moderate Pressure Hydrocracking (MHPC) was introduced by MTC prior to July 1997.

== Mobil outside of the United States ==
=== Mobil UK ===
Vacuum Oil Company started selling lubricating oils in Europe in the late 19th century. In 1885, the company established its European marketing organization in Liverpool, setting up small works in 1896 and 1901. By the 1930s its Mobiloil had become one of the main brands. Mobil gradually expanded its operation into fuels retailing as well, and opened its first UK service stations in the early 1950s, after the wartime POOL monopoly was disbanded. Mobil grew to become the seventh largest brand of petrol in Britain, supplying 1,990 outlets in 1965, and claimed in the mid-1960s to be the first company to operate 100 self-service stations. As well as its downstream interests, Mobil was active in the North Sea and operated an oil refinery in Coryton (opened in 1953), on the Thames estuary. In 1996, Mobil's fuels operations in Europe were placed into a joint venture 70% owned by BP, and the Mobil brand disappeared from service stations. Mobil continued to sell lubricants through BP and independent service stations. Following Mobil's merger with Exxon, at the start of 2000 BP acquired all the petrol retailing assets as well as the Coryton refinery (but sold it to Petroplus in 2007). Mobil returned to being purely a lubricant brand in Europe, and became the premium quality oil on sale at Esso service stations.

=== Mobil Australia ===
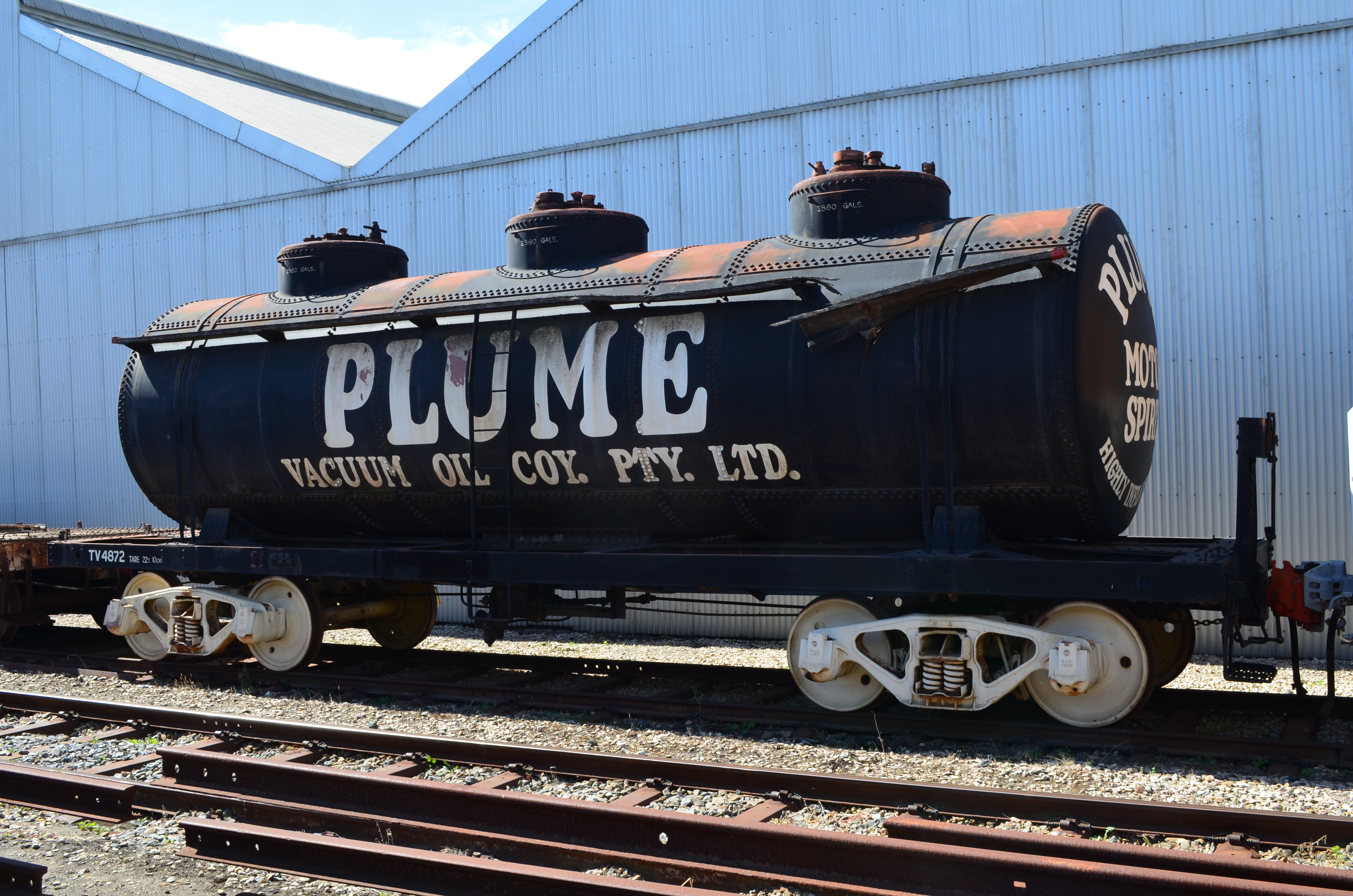
A preserved ex-South Australian Railways tank wagon in Plume brand livery. Plume was then replaced by Mobilgas

The Vacuum Oil Company began operating in Australia in 1895, introducing its Plume brand of petrol in 1916. The Flying Red Horse (Pegasus) logo was introduced in 1939, and in 1954, the Plume brand was replaced by Mobilgas.

Mobil Australia's corporate office is in Melbourne. In 1946, Mobil began construction of its refinery at Altona, in Melbourne's western suburbs, which originally produced lubricating oils and bitumen, before commencing the production of motor vehicle fuels in 1956. A second refinery at Port Stanvac, south of Adelaide, came on-stream in 1963, but was closed in 2003. Mobil commenced removal of the refinery in July 2009, together with site remediation works.

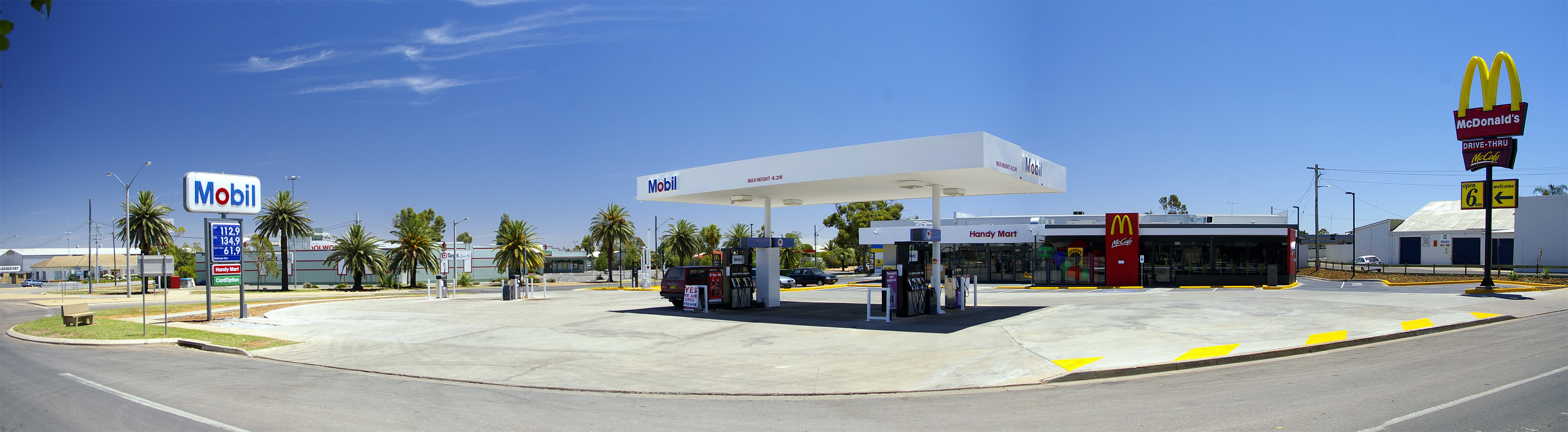
Mobil station and McDonald's restaurant in Leeton, New South Wales, Australia (2008)

In 1985, Mobil swapped its Western Australian retail market with a large portion of BP's South Australian, Victorian and New South Wales retail market in a major asset swap. In 1990, Mobil acquired the service station and refining network of Esso Australia. This also resulted in Mobil's full ownership of Petroleum Refineries (Australia) Pty Ltd, which also operated the Altona and Adelaide Refineries. In December 1995, Mobil re-entered the West Australian retail fuel market when it purchased the Amgas service station network and related business.

On 27 May 2009, Caltex Australia announced it would be acquiring 302 Mobil service stations in Melbourne, Brisbane, Sydney and Adelaide, subject to approval of the Australian Competition & Consumer Commission (ACCC). The ACCC subsequently announced its opposition to the takeover, citing the likelihood of increased fuel prices due to diminished competition.

On 27 May 2010, 7-Eleven announced that it had acquired Mobil's Australian network of 295 service stations, with fuel still to be supplied by Mobil. At the same time, it was announced that out of the 295 stations, 7-Eleven had sold 29 South Australian service stations to Peregrine Corporation. Peregrine's acquisition saw Mobil's sites in South Australia rebranded to On the Run (later OTR) convenience stores, but they continued to be supplied by Mobil until most were switched to BP. Meanwhile, since January 2012, all fuel in 7-Eleven stores is supplied by Mobil. 7-Eleven store renovations and openings since 2014 have included prominent placement of the Mobil logo (as the advertised fuel supplier), usually underneath the 7-Eleven logo, on main signage as well as on petrol pumps.

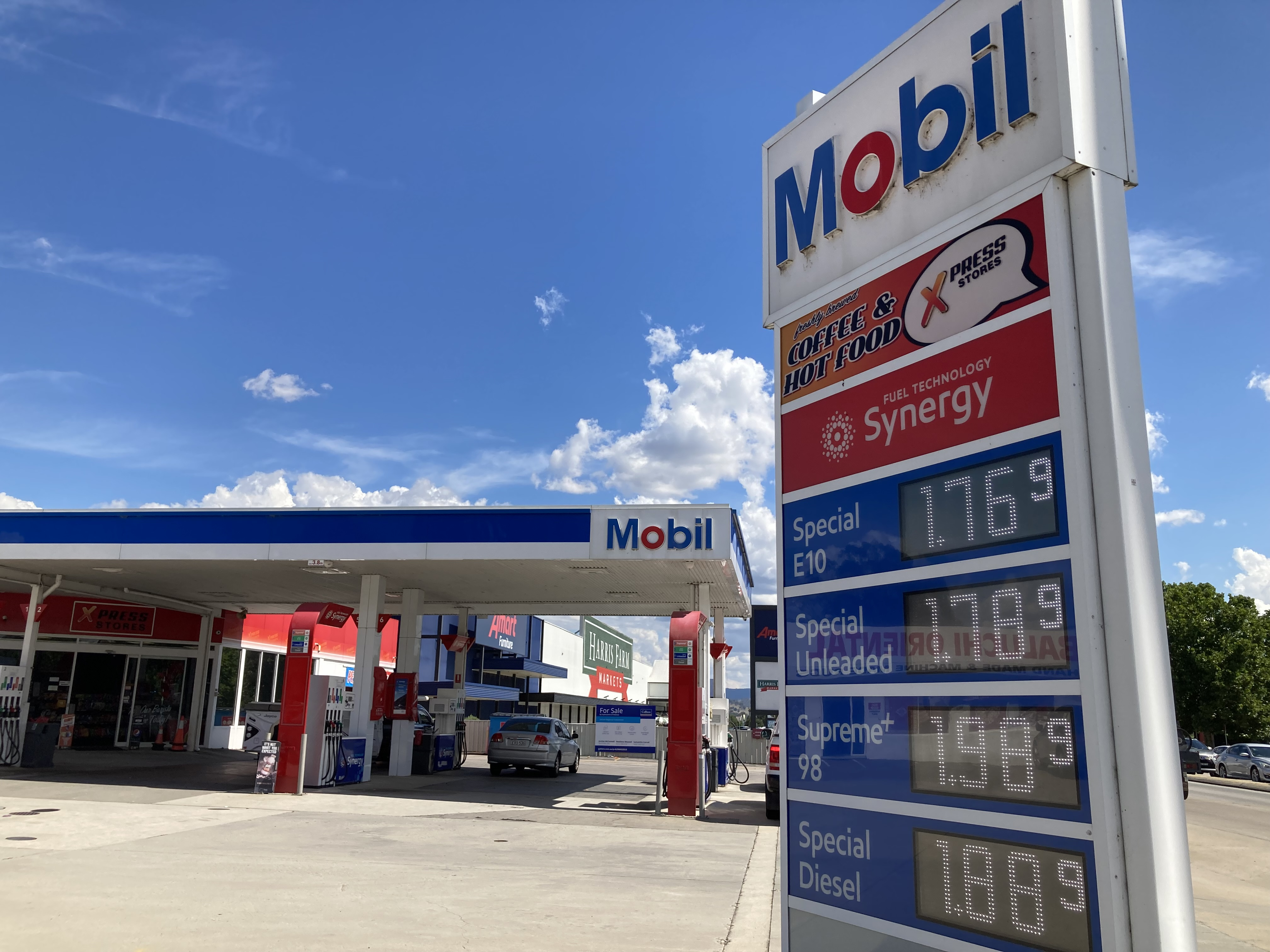
Mobil station in Albury, New South Wales, Australia (2024)

After the 7-Eleven sale, Mobil has since returned to the country with its own-branded service stations. As of October 2022, Mobil operates 229 own-branded service stations across the country; the majority in the Australian east coast (except Tasmania) and South Australia. There were also a few in Western Australia.

=== Mobil New Zealand ===
Mobil is the oldest oil company in New Zealand. Its kerosene first appeared in the country under the Standard Oil brand in the 1870s. Early in 1896, Vacuum Oil of New York established a marketing office on Featherston Street in Wellington selling lamp oil and harness grease. It brought with it extensive collective production, marketing and management skills that presented a major advancement in business organisation. The company's unrivaled mineral lubricant products and associated services quickly dominated the market.

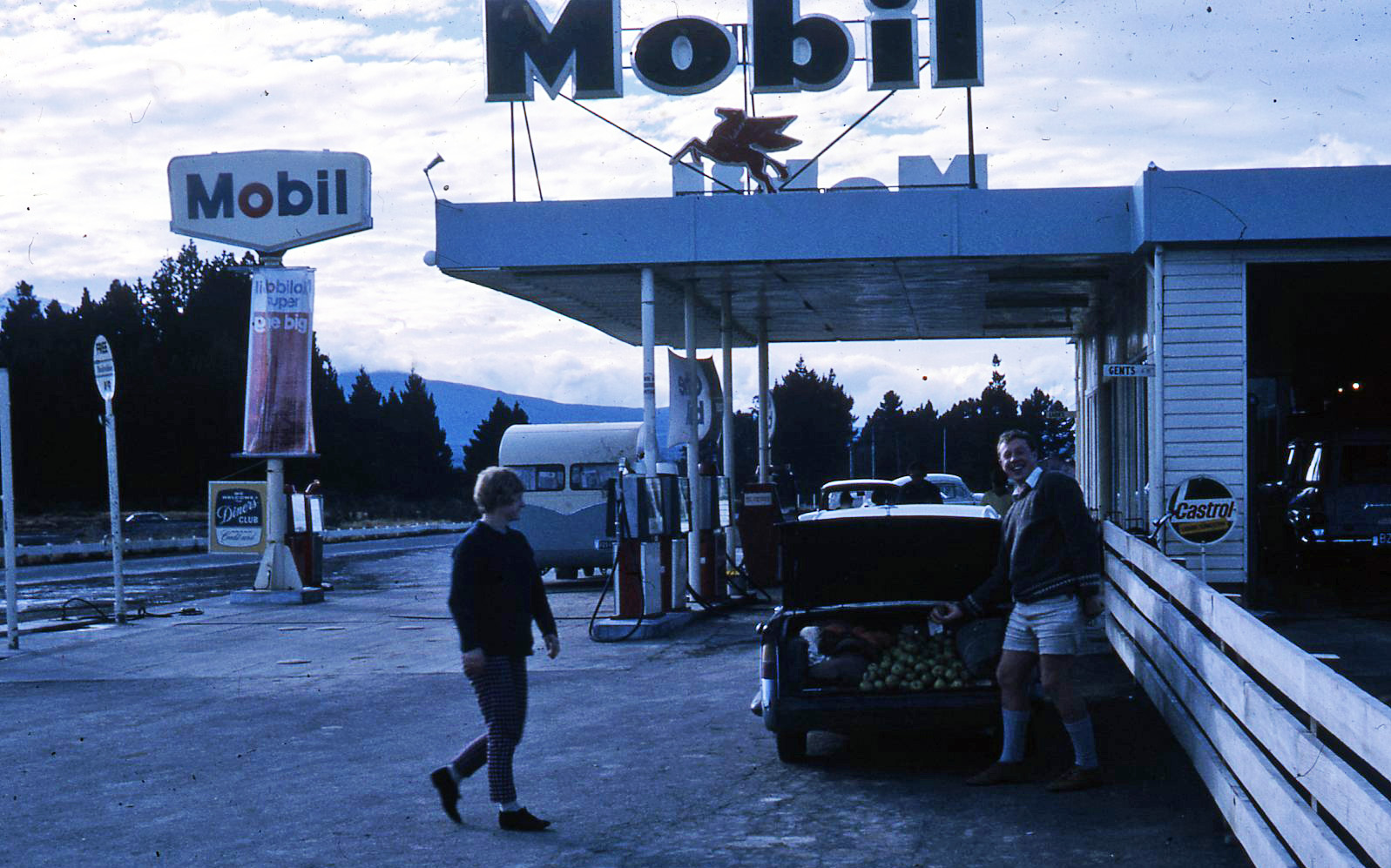
Mobil station in New Zealand (1969). As Vacuum Oil, it was the first oil company to establish an office in New Zealand.

When New Zealanders began taking to the motorcar in the early twentieth century, Vacuum Oil expanded into the oil refining business. Its marketing network and transportation fleet grew as it extended its range of operation. The company continued to meet New Zealand's fuel needs throughout World War One, holding roughly 85 percent of the market. After the war, Vacuum Oil began facing very strong competition, with a number of multinational oil companies which establishing operations in New Zealand. Among these competitors was the Atlantic Union Oil Company, another of the companies from which ExxonMobil is descended.

Atlantic Union was bought by the New Jersey–based Standard Oil Company, which would later become Exxon, and its eastern hemisphere interests were merged with those of Socony-Vacuum Oil Company to create the Standard-Vacuum Oil Company. The new company continued operations in New Zealand under both the Vacuum and Atlantic Union brand names.

On November 30, 1999, Exxon Corporation and Mobil Oil Corporation merged with Mobil Oil New Zealand Limited now owned by new entity ExxonMobil. The company currently owns a 17.2 percent share in The New Zealand Refining Company Limited which operates an oil refinery at Marsden Point. It supplies roughly 20 percent of the total fuels market in New Zealand, for which most of its products are sourced from the Marsden Point refinery. Mobil Oil New Zealand Limited has more than 150 locations across the country, some of which are franchisee-owned. It also operates six storage locations across the country and maintains a reputation as a dominant petroleum company in New Zealand.

Mobil New Zealand has 167 stations as of 2022, including 68 in Auckland. Its stations included 121 company-owned and 46 franchisee-owned outlets.

=== Mobil in Mongolia ===
In Mongolia, Mobil brand is distributed by Petrovis Oil LLC. Petrovis Oil is subsidiary of Petrovis Group and the first distributor and official distributor in Mongolia of the Mobil brand.

=== Mobil in Japan ===
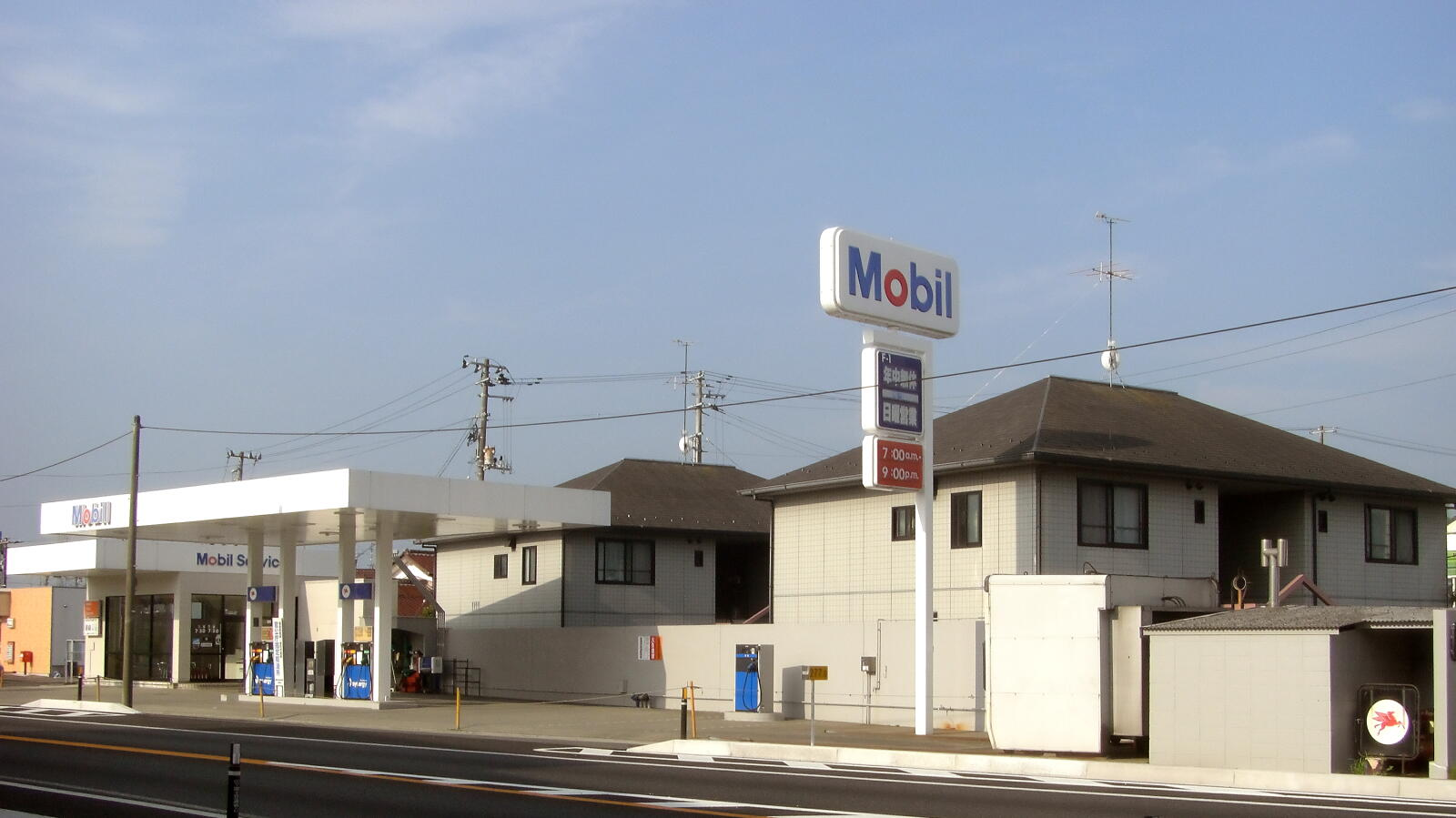
Mobil station in Japan (2008)

Since the 1960s, Esso and Mobil stations in Japan had been run by Tōnen General Sekiyu, which had a controlling stake owned by ExxonMobil. In 2012, the company bought out much of ExxonMobil's stake, reducing it to a 22% minority. In 2016, ExxonMobil sold the remainder of its stake.

In 2017, the company announced that it would merge with JX Group to form JXTG Holdings, with its petroleum business operating as JXTG Nippon Oil & Energy. Following the merger, it was announced that both the Esso and Mobil brands would be phased out by 2020, and replaced by the Eneos EneJet banner.

=== Mobil in Canada ===
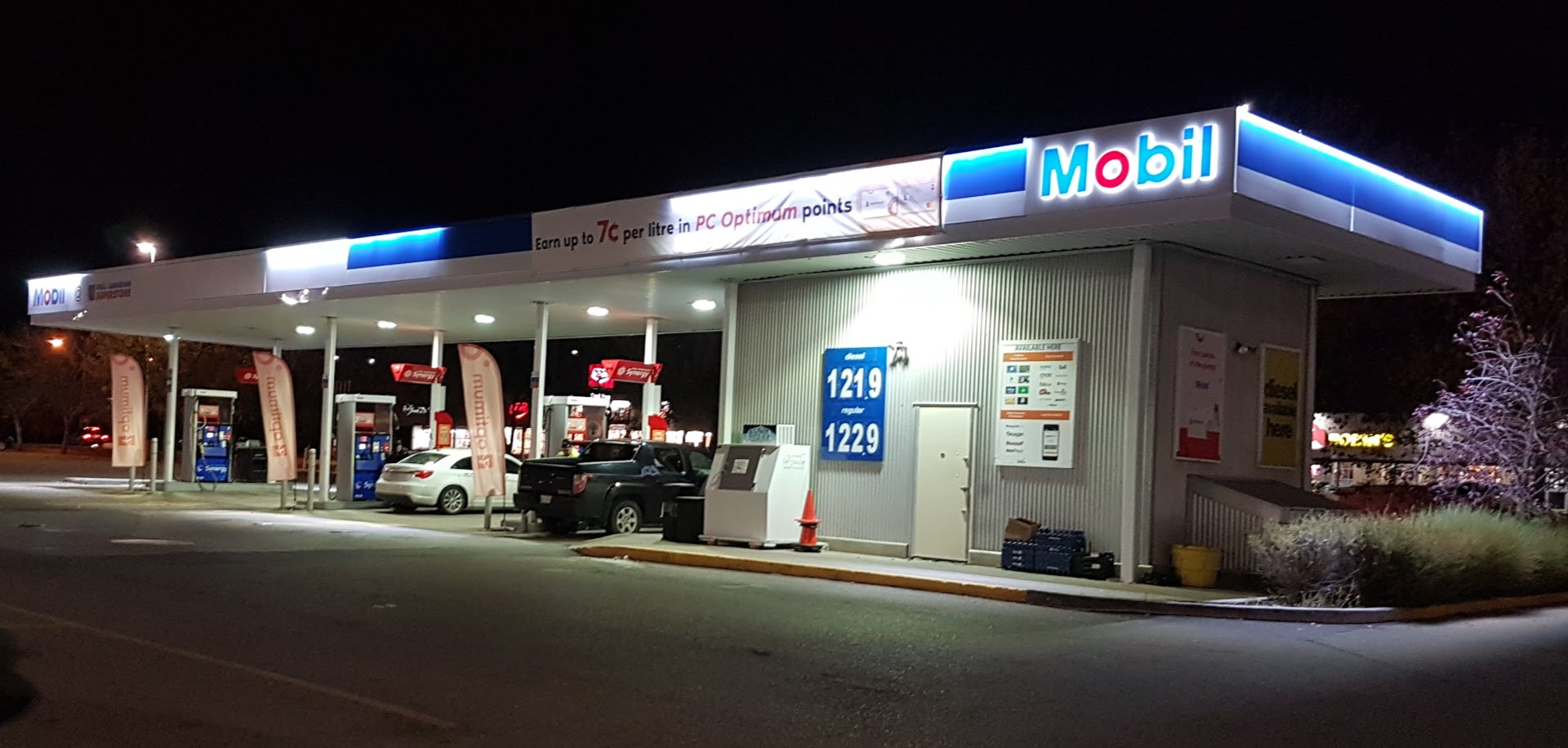
A Mobil gas station in Regina, Saskatchewan outside a Real Canadian Superstore (2018)

In April 2017, Loblaw Companies sold its network of 213 gas stations (all of which are attached to its various grocery store locations) to Brookfield Business Partners. Brookfield (operating as BG Fuels) announced that it would license the Mobil brand from ExxonMobil for use on these locations, making them a sister to Imperial Oil's network of Esso-branded gas stations in Canada. As part of the sale agreement, the Mobil stations continue to offer Loblaw's PC Optimum rewards program; Esso itself would also join PC Optimum the following year.

BG Fuels stated that it would open further Mobil stations beyond the Loblaw properties. BG Fuels later merged with Greenergy, and adopted the new brand Waypoint for convenience stores associated with its fuel properties. In 2023, Greenergy sold its Canadian retail operations to Global Fuels. 7-Eleven has also begun to franchise Mobil for selected locations, as part of a phase-out of 7-Eleven-branded gas stations in selected provinces in favour of national brands.

=== Mobil Egypt ===
In Egypt, ExxonMobil's operations started in 1902, it is known for providing lubricants and fuels as well as convenience products. It offers more than 350 service stations, more than 40 Mobil 1 centers and a variety of industrial products, lubrication programs and services. Some stations in Cairo, Alexandria and Giza feature On the Run convenience stores.

=== Mobil Portugal ===
Vacuum Oil Company started its operations in Portugal in 1896. In 1941, it became the Socony-Vacuum Oil Company and in 1952, it was renamed Socony Vacuum Portuguesa. In 1955, it became the Mobil Oil Portuguesa. Vacuum Oil was involved in the support of the first auto sports events in Portugal, as well as being responsible for the edition of first road maps and auto drivers guides in the country. Between 1920 and 1928, Vacuum Oil had an important role in the traffic signage of the roads of Portugal, installing thousands of road signs which included the identification of their sponsor, making the company known throughout the country. Along its history, Mobil was pioneer in a number of aspect of the oil business in the country, including the introduction of the first metering pumps, the first network of self-service filling stations and the first motorway service area. The Mobil brand disappeared from the Portuguese service stations in 1996, in the scope of the European joint-venture with BP. In 2000, at the time being the oldest oil company operating in Portugal, Mobil Oil Portuguesa was acquired by BP and disbanded.

== Leadership ==
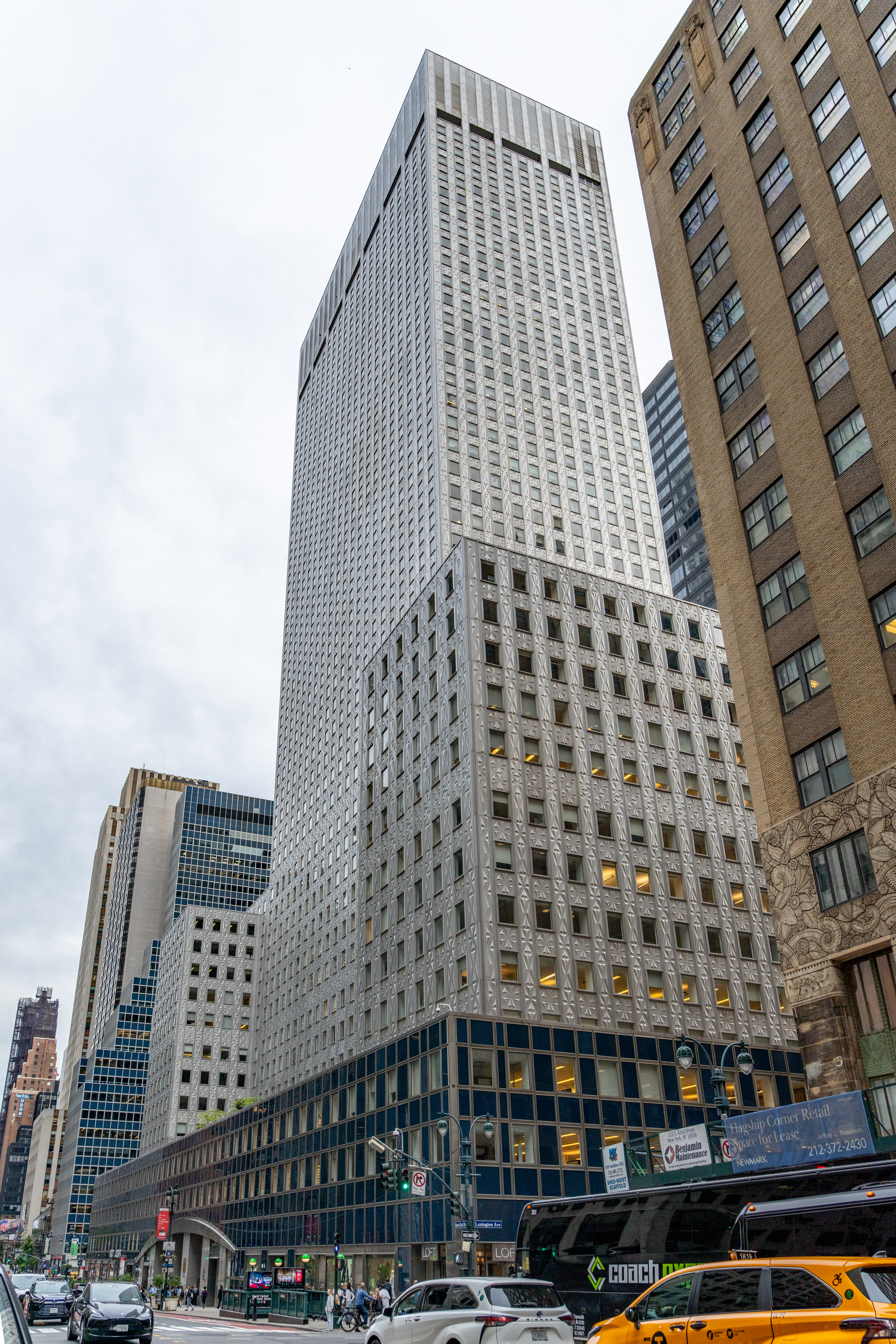
The Socony-Mobil Building, the company's headquarters in New York, was designed by Harrison & Abramovitz and opened on October 17, 1956. (2025)

=== President ===
1. William Avery Rockefeller Jr., 1892–1911
2. Henry Clay Folger Jr., 1911–1923
3. Herbert Lee Pratt, 1923–1928
4. Charles Francis Meyer, 1928–1931
5. Charles Edward Arnott, 1931–1935
6. John Albert Brown, 1935–1944
7. Benjamin Brewster Jennings, 1944–1955
8. Albert Lindsay Nickerson Jr., 1955–1961
9. Herbert Willetts, 1961–1964
10. Rawleigh Warner Jr., 1965–1969
11. William Peter Tavoulareas, 1969–1984
12. Allen Edward Murray, 1985–1993
13. Lucio Anthony Noto, 1993–1998
14. Eugene Andrew Renna, 1998–1999

=== Chairman of the Board ===
1. Henry Clay Folger Jr., 1923–1928
2. Herbert Lee Pratt, 1928–1935
3. Harold Frank Sheets, 1944–1948
4. George Van Syckle Holton, 1948–1955
5. Benjamin Brewster Jennings, 1955–1958
6. Fred William Bartlett, 1958–1961
7. Albert Lindsay Nickerson Jr., 1961–1969
8. Rawleigh Warner Jr., 1969–1986
9. Allen Edward Murray, 1986–1994
10. Lucio Anthony Noto, 1994–1999

== See also ==
- Mobil Showcase Network
- Previous headquarters buildings
  - Socony-Mobil Building
  - 26 Broadway
