= Mexican Central Railway =

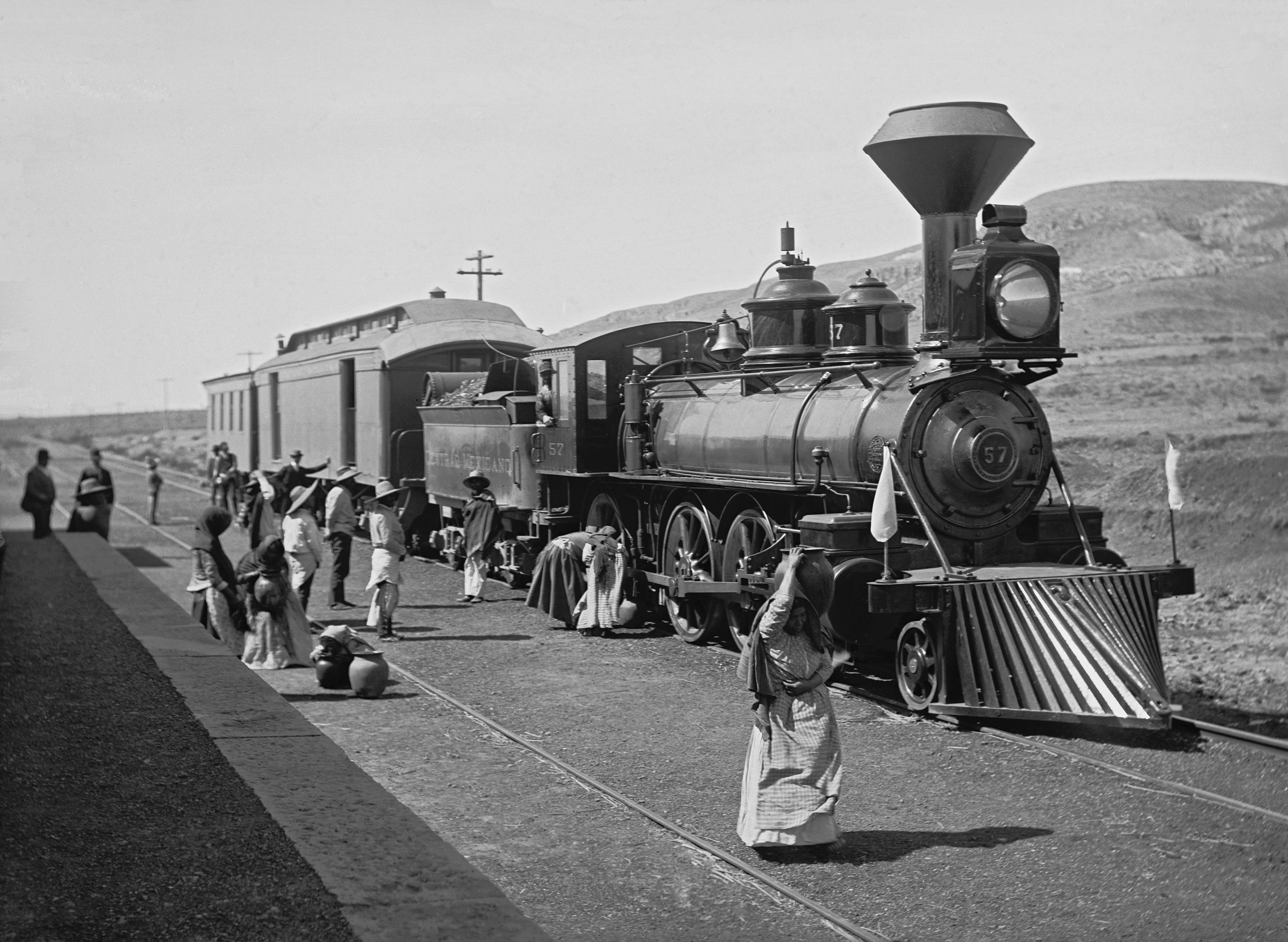
Mexican Central Railway train, between 1884 and 1897

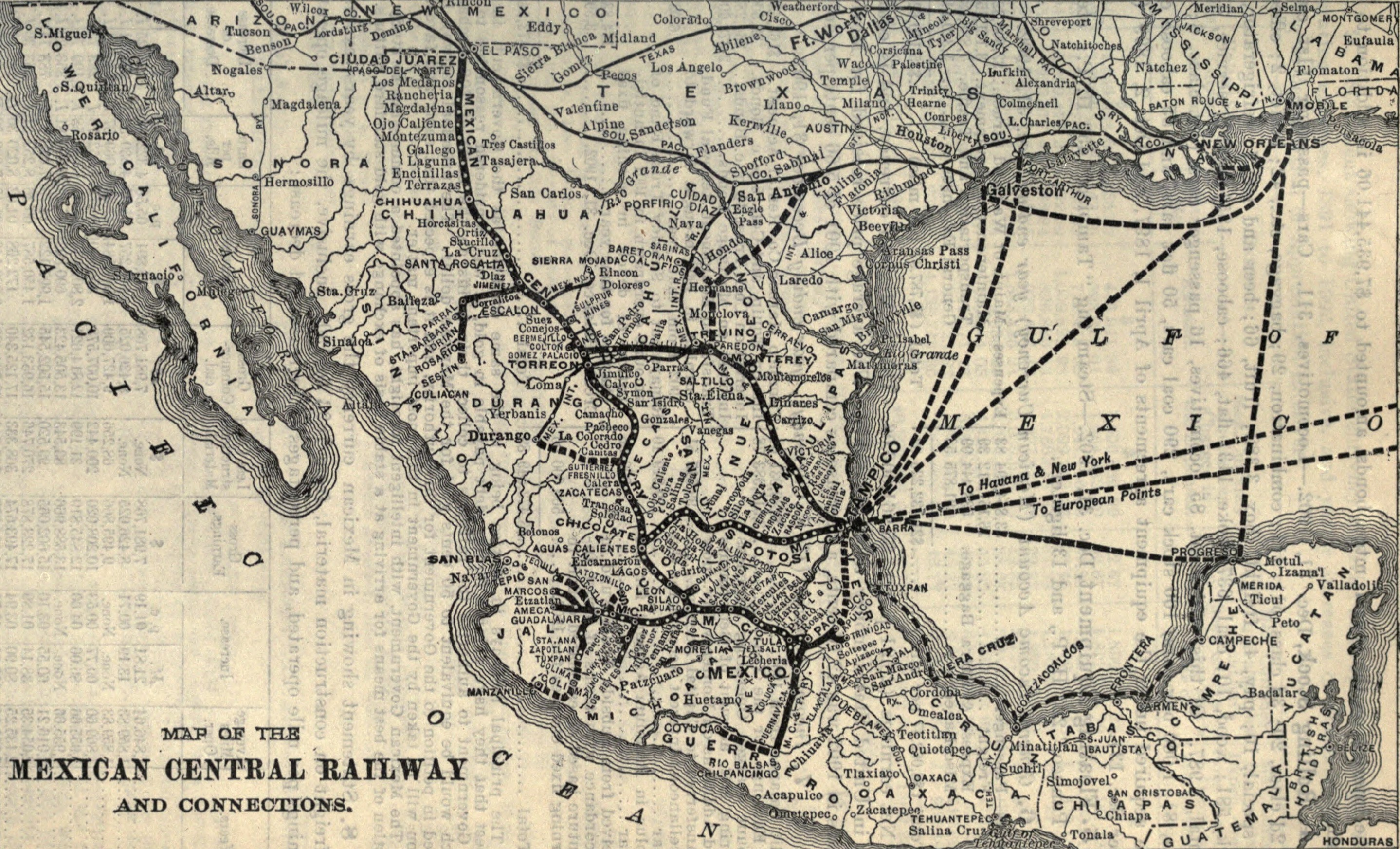
1903 map of the Mexican Central Railway and connections

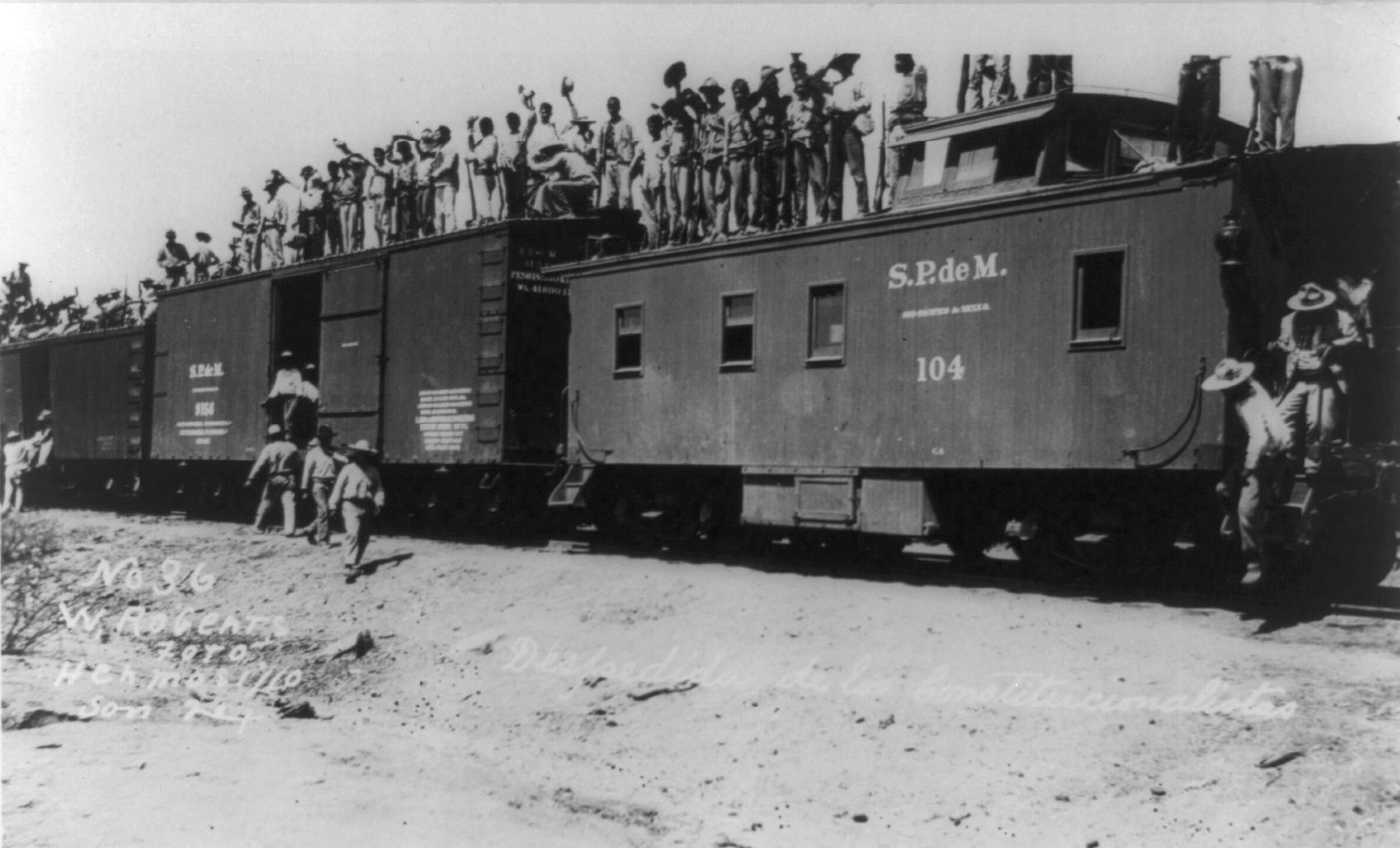
Written on this photo taken between 1911 and 1914 is "despedida de los constitucionalistas" (waving goodbye to the Constitutionalists) for soldiers standing on top of S.P. de M. railroad cars during the Mexican revolution

The Mexican Central Railway (Ferrocarril Central Mexicano) was one of the primary pre-nationalization railways of Mexico. Incorporated in Massachusetts in 1880, it opened the main line in March 1884, linking Mexico City to Ciudad Juárez, across the Rio Grande from El Paso and connections to the Southern Pacific Railroad, Texas and Pacific Railway, and Atchison, Topeka and Santa Fe Railway. Other major branches included Irapuato to Guadalajara (completed in 1888), Chicalote to Tampico (completed in 1890), and Guadalajara to Manzanillo (completed in 1908). The Mexican Central acquired control in June 1901 of the Monterey and Mexican Gulf Railroad, which connected the Mexican International Railroad at Reata (near Monterrey) to Tampico, and connected its main line with this line at the Monterrey end through a branch from Gómez Palacio. The Mexico, Cuernavaca and Pacific Railroad, owner of an unfinished line from Mexico City to Acapulco (completed to Rio Balsas), joined the system in November 1902, and in 1905 the Mexican Central bought the Coahuila and Pacific Railway (Torreón to Saltillo), which paralleled the branch from Gómez Palacio to Monterrey and was to be operated jointly with the National Railroad of Mexico.

The Mexican government gained control in 1906, and in February 1909 the Ferrocarriles Nacionales de México (National Railways of Mexico) took over the property. Following privatization in the 1990s, Ferromex acquired most of the former Mexican Central, the primary exception being the branch from Chicalote to Tampico, which was assigned to Transportación Ferroviaria Mexicana (now Kansas City Southern de México).
