= List of Mexican railroads =

This is a list of Mexican railroads, common carrier railroads operating as part of rail transport in Mexico.

== Passenger rail ==
- Ferrocarril Suburbano de la Zona Metropolitana del Valle de México
- STC Metrorrey
- Servicio de Transportes Eléctricos
- Metro de la Ciudad de México
- Sistema de Tren Eléctrico Urbano
- Tren interurbano El Insurgente
- Ferrocarril Chihuahua al Pacífico
- Tequila Express
- Tren Maya
- Ferrocarril del Istmo de Tehuantepec

== Class I railroads ==
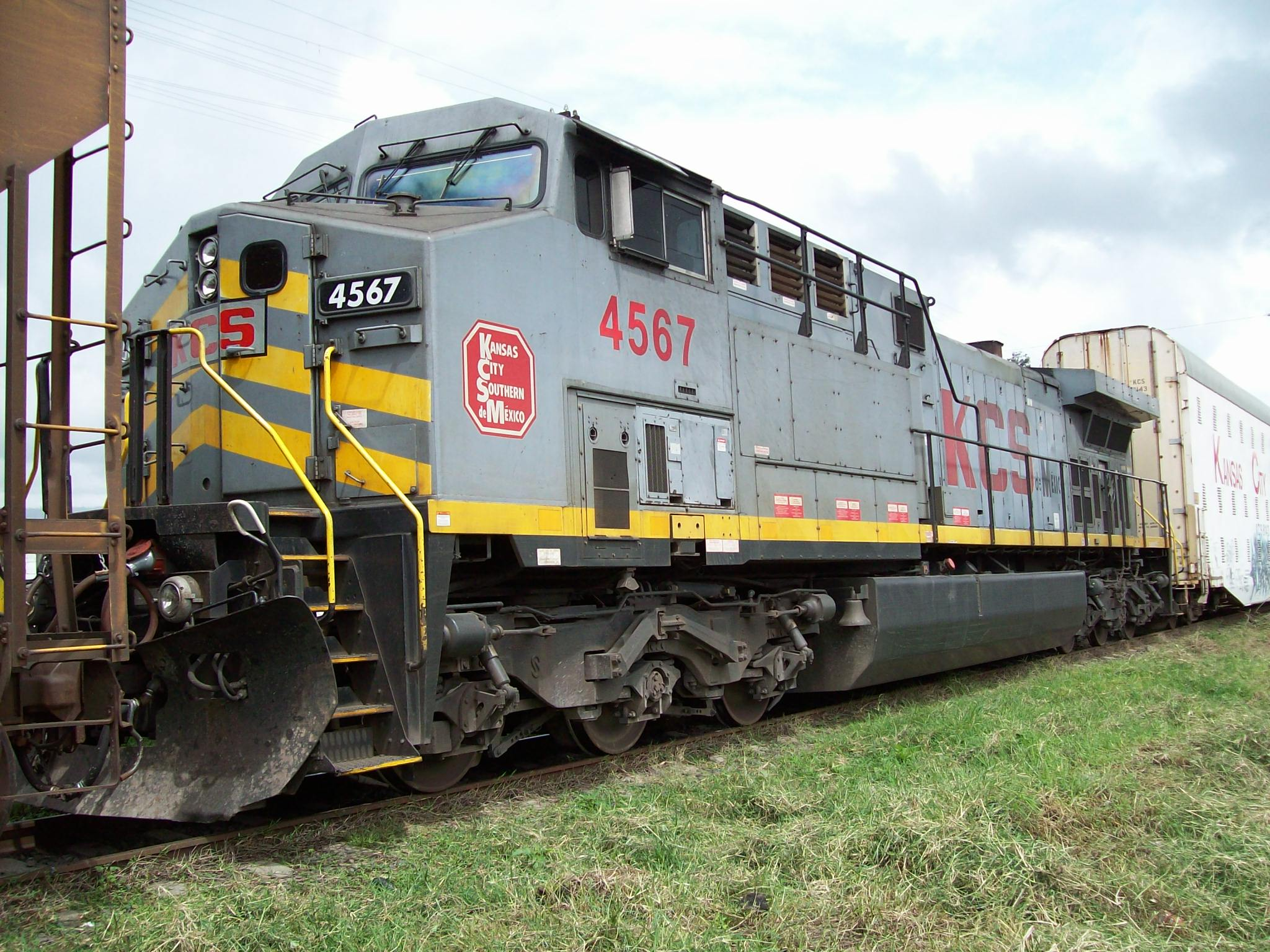
KCSM locomotive near Caltzonzin Station in Michoacán (October 2009)

There are two Class I railroads:

- Ferromex (FXE)
- Canadian Pacific Kansas City (CPKC)

Additionally the two Class I railroads jointly own a railroad that provides access to Mexico City

- Ferrocarril y Terminal del Valle de México (Ferrovalle)

== Shortline railroads ==
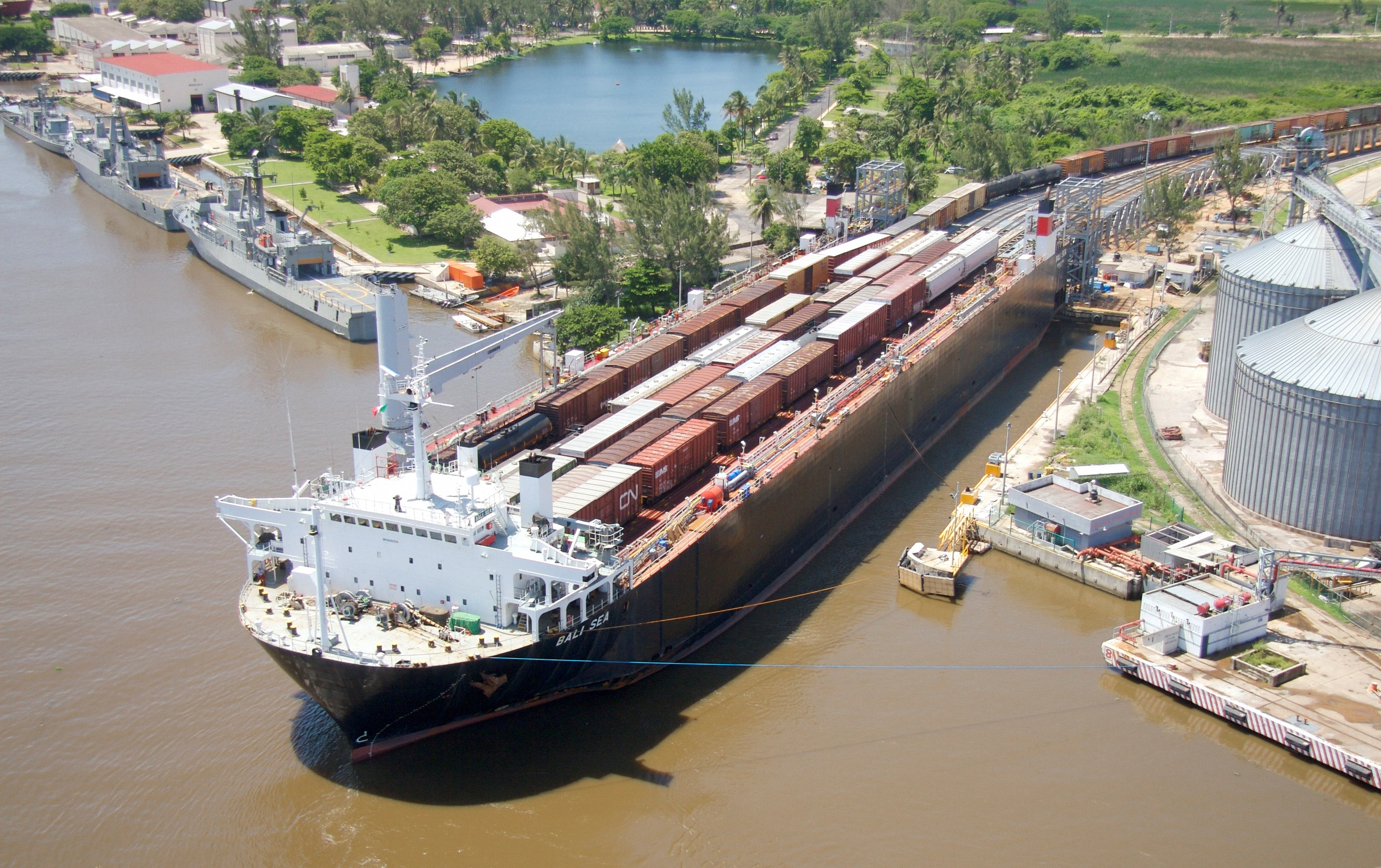
MV Bali Sea loads up with Ferrosur trains in Coatzacoalcos (October 2007)

Shortline and terminal railroad companies include:

- Linea Ferrocarril Coahuila-Durango (LFCD)
- Baja California Railroad (BJRR)
- CG Railway
- Tren Interoceánico
- Ferrosur (FSRR)

== Railway links with adjacent countries ==
To its north, Mexico shares a border with the United States that is 3,169 km (1,969 mi) in length The two countries share the same track gauge of 1,435 mm (4 ft 8 1/2 in), with multiple links. CG Railway operates a train ferry between the port of Mobile at Mobile, Alabama and the port of Coatzacoalcos, Veracruz.

To its south, Mexico shares an 871 km (541 mi) border with Guatemala and a 251 km (156 mi) border with Belize. There is rebuilt link with rail transport in Guatemala at Ciudad Tecún Umán in Ayutla, San Marcos, with a break of gauge. 1,435 mm (4 ft 8 1/2 in) standard gauge / 914 mm (3 ft) (rebuilt as standard gauge in 2019)

== Former railroads ==
The following is a list of former railroads:

- Bosques de Chihuahua
- Carrizo Gorge de Mexico
- Ferrocarril Aguascalientes
- Ferrocarril Atlamaxac
- Ferrocarril Cazadero la Torre y Tepetongo
- Ferrocarriles Chiapas-Mayab (FCCM)
- Ferrocarril Cazadero y San Pablo
- Ferrocarril Cazadero y Solis
- Ferrocarril Central Mexicano (see also Ferrocarriles Nacionales de Mexico)
- Ferrocarril Chihuahua al Pacifico now operated as a passenger line by Ferromex
- Ferrocarril Coahuila y Zacatecas
- Ferrocarril de Córdoba a Huatusco
- Ferrocarril Desague del Valle de Mexico
- El Oro Mining and Railway Company
- El Paso Southern Railway (see Mexico North Western Railway)
- Ferrocarril Guanajuato a San Luis de la Paz y Pozos
- Ferrocarril Hidalgo y Nordeste
- Ferrocarril de Hornos
- Ferrocarril Inter-California
- Ferrocarril Interoceanico
- Ferrocarril Ixtlahuaca
- Ferrocarril Jalapa y Cordoba
- Kansas City, Mexico and Orient Railway
- Kansas City Southern de Mexico (KCSM)
- Ferrocarril Mapimi
- Ferrocarril Matehuala
- Ferrocarril Merida a Calkini
- Ferrocarril de Merida a Peto
- Ferrocarril Merida a Valladolid
- Ferrocarril Mexicali y Golfo
- Ferrocarril Mexicano (FCM)
- Ferrocarril Mexicano del Sur
- Mexico North Western Railway
- Ferrocarril Michoacan y Pacifico
- Ferrocarril Monte Alto y Tlalnepantla
- Monterrey Mineral and Terminal Railway
- Ferrocarril Nacozari
- Ferrocarril Nacional de la Baja California
- Ferrocarril Oaxaca a Ejutla
- Ferrocarril del Pacifico (FCP)
- Panuco Mountain and Monclova Railroad
- Ferrocarril Parral y Durango
- Ferrocarril Peninsular de Merida-Yucatan
- Potosi Central Railroad
- Ferrocarril Potosi y Rio Verde (FPyRv)
- Rio Grande, Sierra Madre & Pacific Railway (see Mexico North Western Railway)
- Ferrocarril San Gregorio
- Ferrocarril San Marcos a Huajapan de Leon
- Ferrocarril San Rafael y Atlixco
- Sinaloa and Durango Railroad
- Ferrocarril Sonora-Baja California (SBC)
- Ferrocarriles Nacionales de Mexico (Freight Service)
- Southern Pacific of Mexico
- Ferrocarril de Tacubaya
- Ferrocarril Tlacotepec a Huajapan de Leon
- Ferrocarril Toluca y Zitacuaro
- Ferrocarriles Toluca a Tenango y San Juan
- Ferrocarril Torres a Prietas
- Tehuantepec National Railway (see Tren Interoceánico)
- Ferrocarriles Unidos del Sureste (FUS)
- Ferrocarriles Unidos de Yucatán (U de Y)
- Ferrocarril del Valle de Mexico
- Ferrocarril Vanegas, Cedral, y Rio Verde
- Ferrocarril Vera Cruz a Anton Lizardo y Alvarado

== See also ==
- Aerotrén
- Copper Canyon
- Decauville
- Ferrocarriles Chiapas-Mayab
- Guadalajara light rail system
- La Bestia
- List of named passenger trains of Mexico
- Mexico City Metro
- Monterrey Metro
- Tequila Express
- Mexico City Light Rail
- Mayan Train
