= Mexicali (train) =

Overview
- Service type: Inter-city rail
- Status: Closed
- Former operator(s): Ferrocarril Sonora–Baja California; Ferrocarril del Pacífico

Route
- Termini: Mexicali; Guadalajara railway station
- Stops: 56
- Distance travelled: 2,145 km (1,333 mi)

The Mexicali, also called the Burro (donkey), was a passenger train between Guadalajara and Mexicali. It was operated Ferrocarril Sonora Baja California between Mexicali a Benjamín Hill, and by Ferrocarril del Pacífico between Benjamín Hill and Guadalajara.

Today, many of the villages near the stations through which the train passed, are practically uninhabited, because the reason they existed was to sell food to passengers on the railway, as the service disappeared the villages were empty as a result of privatization and the extinction of passenger transport.

The duration of the train was approximately 44 hours throughout and had 56 stops throughout the route.

== Services ==
The train journey from Guadalajara lasted two days, and the train convoy was split in two when it reached Benjamín Hill station; this for El Costeño to continue to Nogales and the rest to continue to Mexicali.

The train cars were hauled by EMD GP40-2 locomotives after the 1970s. The composition of the train in 1968 was as follows:

- Standard consist: 10 coaches, 1 lounge car, and 2 sleeping cars (between Mexicali and Mexico City).
- Standard consist: 10 coaches, 1 lounge car, and 2 sleeping cars (between Mexicali y Guadalajara).

== See also ==
- Rail transport in Mexico
- Ferrocarril del Pacífico
- Ferrocarril Sonora–Baja California
- El Costeño, the train's express counterpart
