= Costeño (train) =

Old passenger train

Overview
- Service type: Inter-city rail
- Status: Closed
- Former operator(s): Southern Pacific Railroad of Mexico; Ferrocarril del Pacífico (post-1950)

Route
- Termini: Nacozari railway station Guadalajara railway station

The Costeño (literally "inhabitant of the coast", "coaster"), also called the Bala ("bullet"), was a passenger train between Guadalajara and Heroica Nogales. The train had a coordinated service and connection to the Argonaut train from Southern Pacific Railroad to Los Angeles.

The train was initially operated by the Southern Pacific Railroad, and then passed to the Ferrocarril del Pacífico.

In 1989, the train suffered a railway accident that left approximately 100 dead and about 200 injured, which went to the vicinity of Guamúchil.

On November 20, 2023, the government of Andrés Manuel López Obrador announced a decree to reactivate seven passenger train routes, including the route of the Costeño.

== Services ==
The Costeño had trains with services of bedroom, dining room, first and second class Cars Although the train was comfortable and cheap, it was not on time with the itinerary it had set.

The Costeño, which had numbers 1 and 2, left every week from Guadalajara at 8 a.m. and arrived in Nogales at 9.40 p.m. The full journey lasted almost 26 hours. Thanks to this the train also received the name of the Bala (bullet).

== See also ==
- Rail transport in Mexico
- Ferrocarril del Pacífico
- Southern Pacific Railroad
- Mexicali (train)
