= Ferrocarril Nacional de la Baja California =

Former railroad line of Mexico

Overview
- Status: Defunct
- Locale: Northern District of Baja California, Mexico

Service
- Type: Railroad

History
- Opened: 1923

Technical
- Line length: 30 km (19 mi) (approximate, as built)

Ferrocarril Nacional de la Baja California is a former railroad line of Mexico. The line was initiated by the governor of the Northern District of Baja California, José Inocente Lugo in February 1923. About 30 kilometers of track were laid before funding ran out. It is a predecessor of the Ferrocarril Sonora-Baja California line.

== See also ==
- List of Mexican railroads
