= Ferrocarril Mexicali y Golfo =

Ferrocarril Mexicali y Golfo was a railroad line in Baja California, Mexico, established in 1901. Within a few years a controlling interest in the railroad was bought by the American Southern Pacific Railroad company. The line eventually built was a predecessor to the Ferrocarril Sonora – Baja California. In 1929 the Mexicali y Golfo was reorganized as the southern line of the Inter-California Railway, under the name Ferrocarril Intercalifornia del Sur.

== See also ==
- List of Mexican railroads
