= Benjamín Hill Municipality =

Coordinates: 30.1954°N 111.2053°W

Benjamín Hill
- Municipality
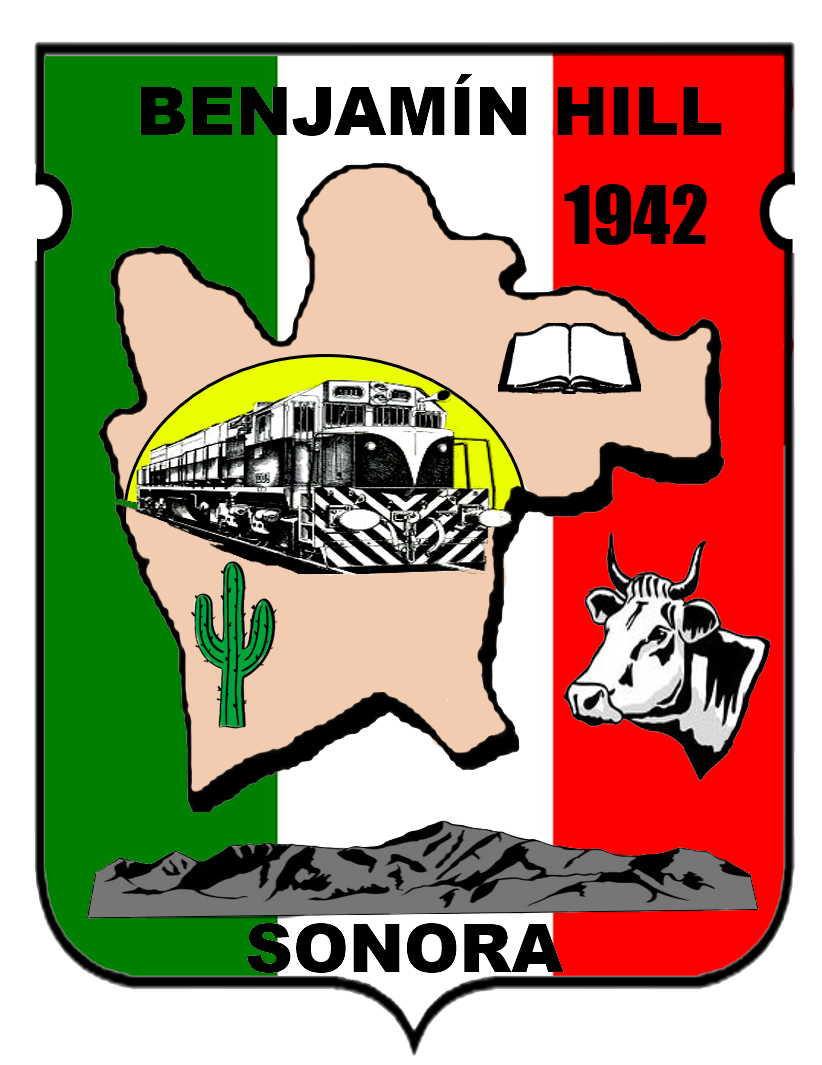
- Coat of arms
- Interactive map of Benjamín Hill
- Country: Mexico
- State: Sonora
- Seat: Benjamín Hill, Sonora

Area
  - Total: 1,408.55 km^{2} (543.84 sq mi)

Population (2020)
  - Total: 4,988
  - Density: 3.54/km^{2} (9.2/sq mi)
- Time zone: UTC–07:00 (Zona Pacífico)

Benjamín Hill is a municipality of the state of Sonora in north-western Mexico. The municipality covers an area of 1408.55 km^{2}. As of 2020, the municipality had a total population of 4,988.

The area of the municipality is 854.70 km^{2} and the population was 5,285 in the census of 2005.
