= Ferrocarriles Unidos del Sureste =

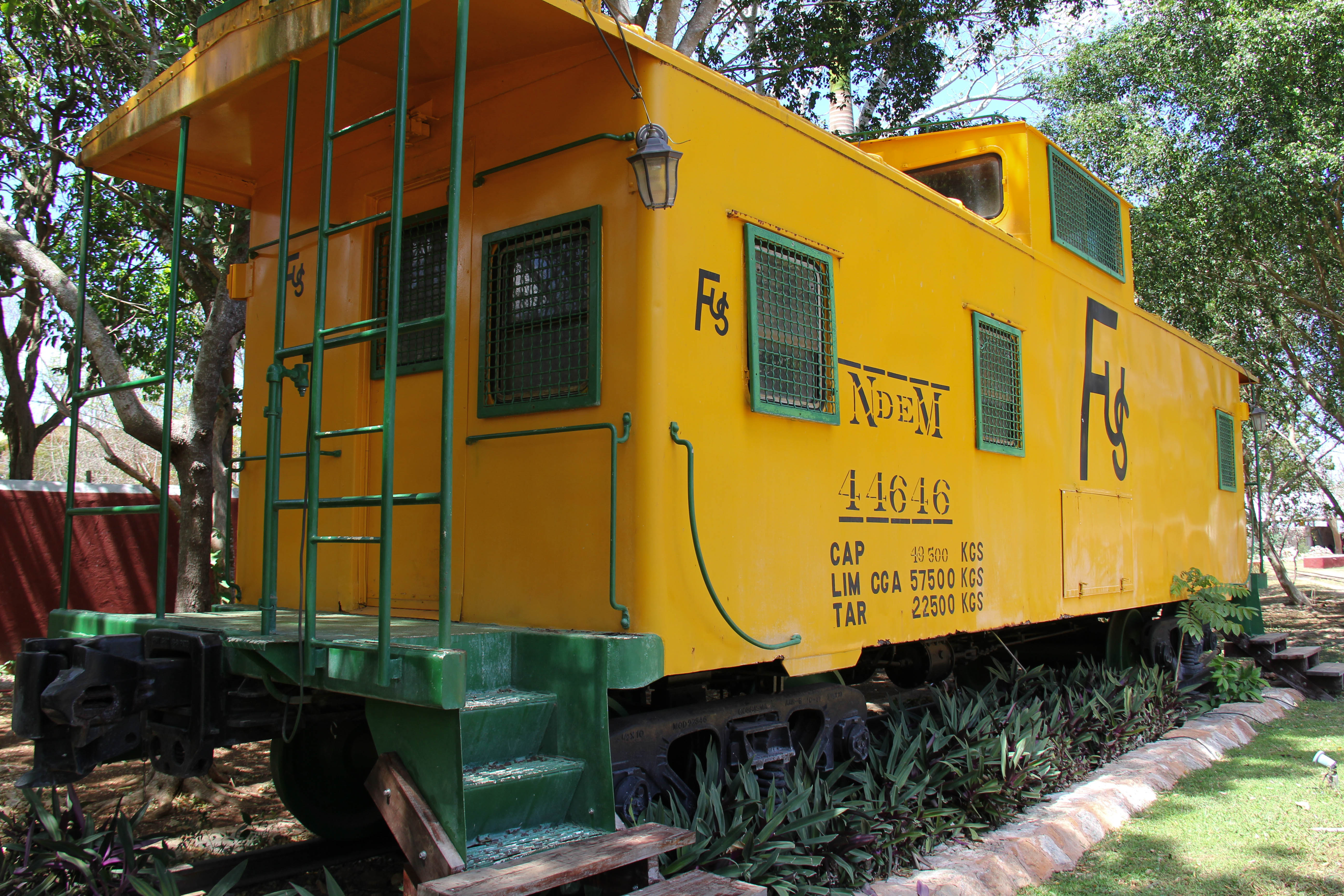
Inactive caboose in Ferrocarriles Unidos del Sureste livery.

Ferrocarriles Unidos del Sureste was a company that operated a railroad in southeastern Mexico. In the 1930s the Mexican government decided to build a railroad into the Yucatán, connecting the national system with the isolated Ferrocarriles Unidos de Yucatán. The project was completed in 1950 as the Ferrocarril del Sureste and commemorated with a 5 peso coin. In 1975 the Yucatán and Southeast systems were merged into the Ferrocarriles Unidos del Sureste. The system was privatized in 1999, becoming part of Ferrocarriles Chiapas-Mayab (FCCM) until 2007 and since part of Ferrocarril del Istmo de Tehuantepec.

== See also ==
- Ferrocarriles Unidos de Yucatán
- List of Mexican railroads
