= Mexico North Western Railway =

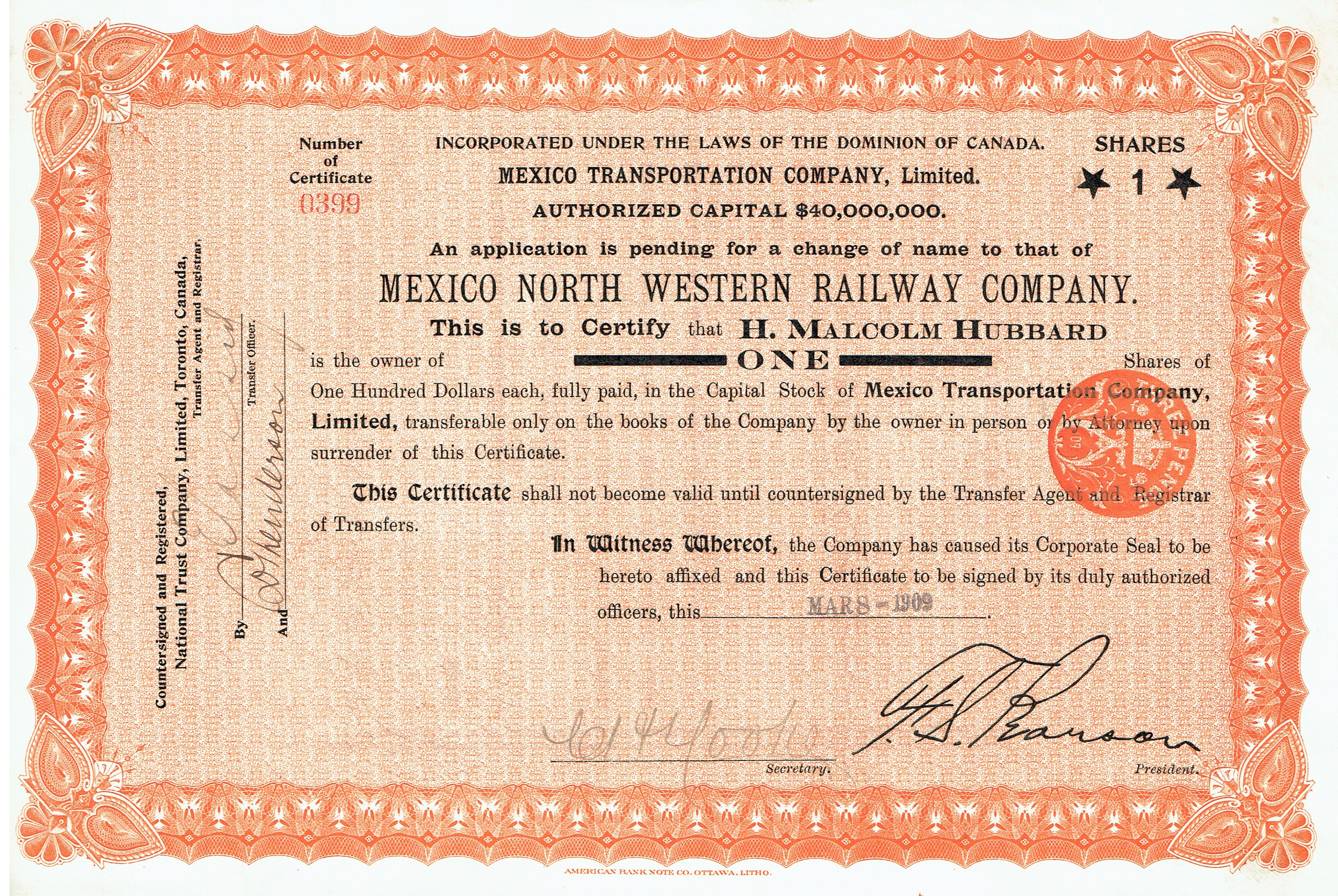
Canadian share of the Mexico North Western Railway, issued 8. March 1909

The Mexico North-Western Railway or Compañía del Ferrocarril Nor-Oeste de México was a railroad that operated in Mexico between Ciudad Juárez and Chihuahua, via Nuevo Casas Grandes in the western portion of the state of Chihuahua. Prior to 1909, it was known as the Rio Grande, Sierra Madre & Pacific Railway. It was built with mostly Canadian capital in order to reach logging and mining operations. Its subsidiary operation, the El Paso Southern, extended into the US at El Paso, Texas. In 1954 the railway was merged into the Ferrocarriles Nacionales de México and the El Paso Southern sold to the Southern Pacific railroad. During the latter years of operation (1947-1954), the railway was controlled by tunnel magnate "Subway Sam" Rosoff, who also controlled large lumber interests along the route.

Due to the amount of mining activity on this line, its trains were occasionally victims of holdup attempts, most notably by Mexican Revolutionary Pancho Villa, who in 1913 raided a train carrying silver and successfully held a Wells Fargo employee for ransom. In January 1916, raiders associated with Villa stopped an MNW train and massacred 18 American employees of the ASARCO company.

During the Punitive Expedition led by U.S. General John J. Pershing in 1916 to attempt to capture Pancho Villa, use of the railway for transporting supplies was a point of contention between the US expedition and the provisional Mexican government of Venustiano Carranza. US troops employed "truck trains" to supply troops due to Carranza's refusal to allow the Americans use of the rail line.

Currently, most of the ex-MNW is not in use; what is being used is now part of Ferromex.

== See also ==
- List of Mexican railroads
- Samalayuca Dunes
