= Ferrosur =

Railway in Mexico

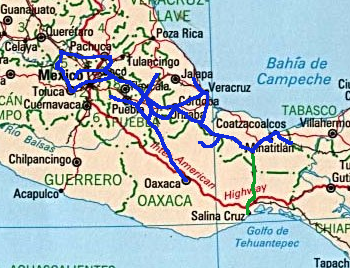
- Map of the Ferrosur network in southern Mexico

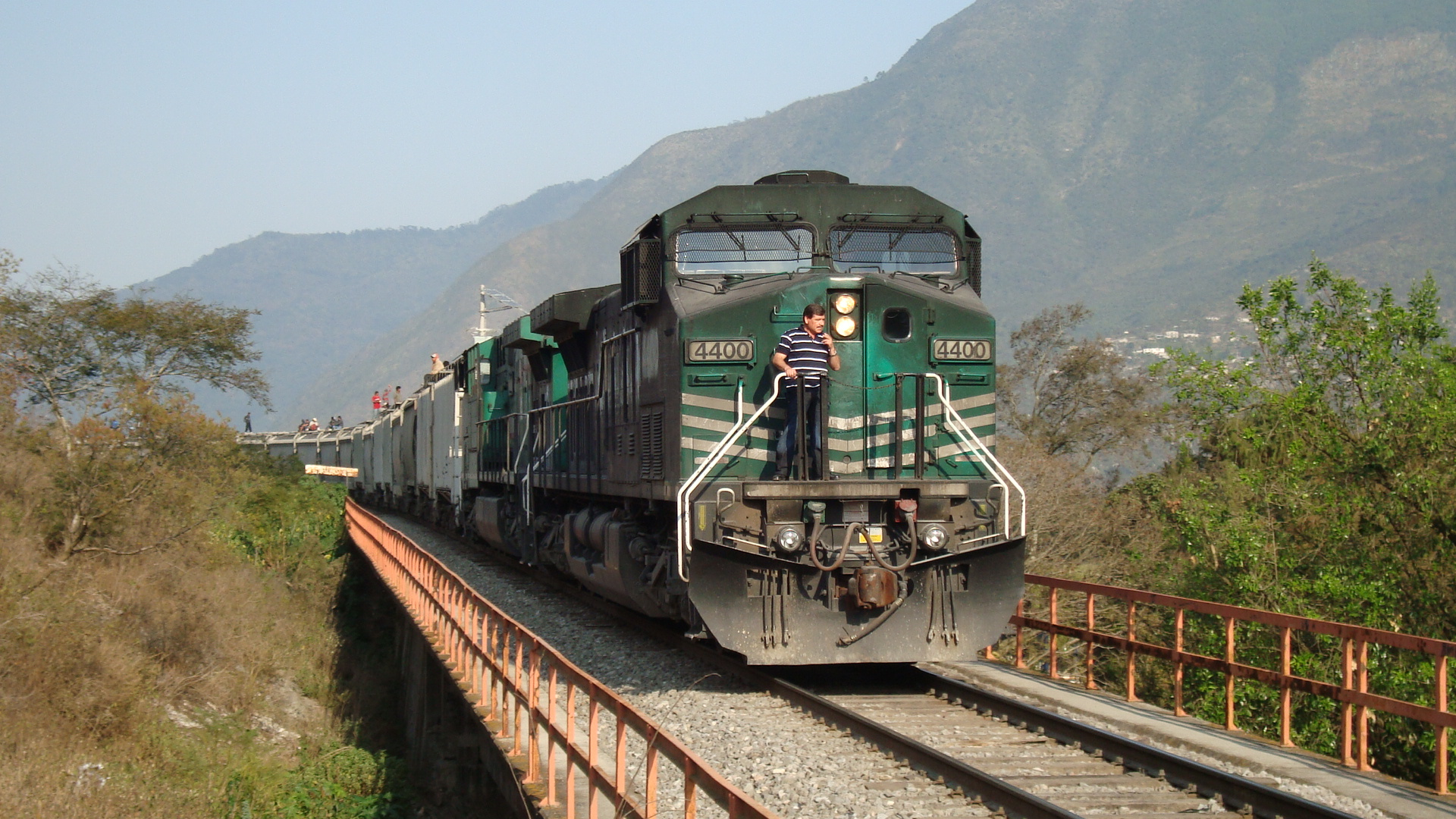
- A Ferrosur train in Veracruz, led by FSRR 4400, a GE AC4400CW

Overview
- Parent company: Grupo México
- Reporting mark: FSRR
- Locale: Southeastern Mexico
- Dates of operation: 1998–present
- Predecessor: Ferrocarriles Nacionales de México
- Successor: Ferromex (subsidiary)

Technical
- Track gauge: 1,435 mm (4 ft 8 1/2 in) standard gauge
- Length: 2,654 km (1,649 mi)

The Ferrocarril del Sureste (reporting mark FSRR) (English: "Southeastern Railway"), commonly known by the syllabic abbreviation Ferrosur, is a railway that serves the southeastern regions of Mexico. The company was formed in 1998, following the privatization of Mexico's railways. Ferrosur won the concession to operate the southeastern railway, which includes the line between Mexico City and Mexico's busiest Gulf of Mexico/Atlantic Ocean port at Veracruz. Grupo México has owned the company since 2005. There are long-delayed plans to merge it with the company's other railway, Ferromex.

== History ==
Ferrosur began operation on December 18, 1998. The original ownership group was the construction company Tribasa and Grupo Financiero Inbursa. Grupo Carso (like Inbursa, a Carlos Slim Helu company) bought out Tribasa in 1999. Grupo México, owner of Ferromex, acquired the railroad in November 2005 in a US$309 million stock transaction. The Mexican Federal Competition Commission (CFC) had rejected a proposed 2002 merger of Ferromex and Ferrosur amid opposition from Grupo Transportación Ferroviaria Mexicana (TFM).

Following the November 2005 purchase of Ferrosur by Grupo México, Kansas City Southern de México (KCSM), successor to TFM, petitioned the Mexican government to block the merger of Ferrosur and Ferromex. The CFC rejected the merger in June 2006 and stated that the merger would have led to excessive concentration in the railroad industry to the detriment of consumers and competing shippers. However, in March 2011, a tribunal ruled in Grupo Mexico's favor, and the merger was permitted. Grupo México continues to operate the two railways independently.

Grupo México's transportation division, operating under the name Grupo México Transportes (GMXT), expanded beyond Mexico in 2017 when it completed the purchase of Florida East Coast Holdings Corp., the parent company of the Florida East Coast Railway, which operates 351 miles of track in Florida between Jacksonville and Miami.

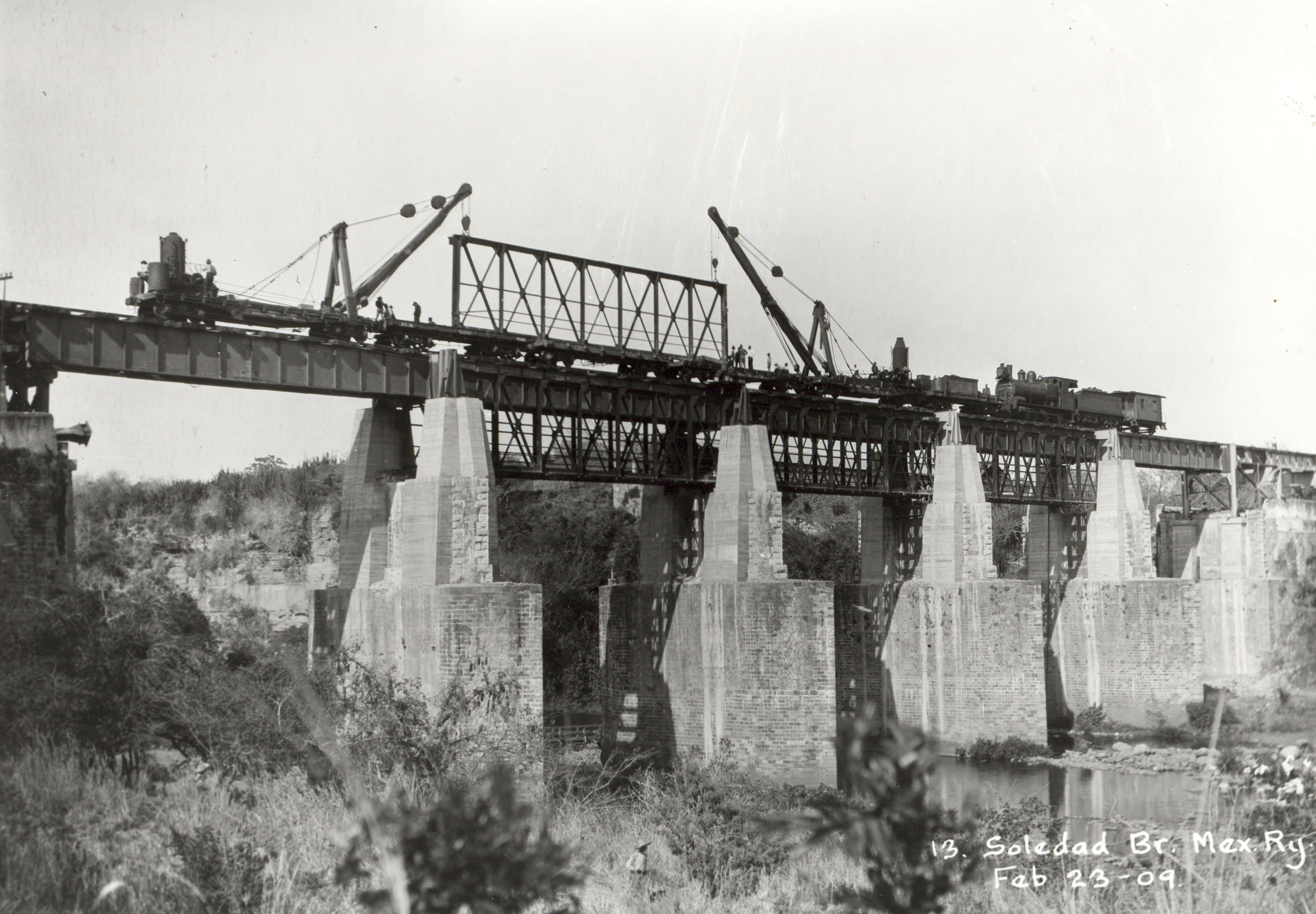
"La Soledad" Bridge (February 23, 1909)

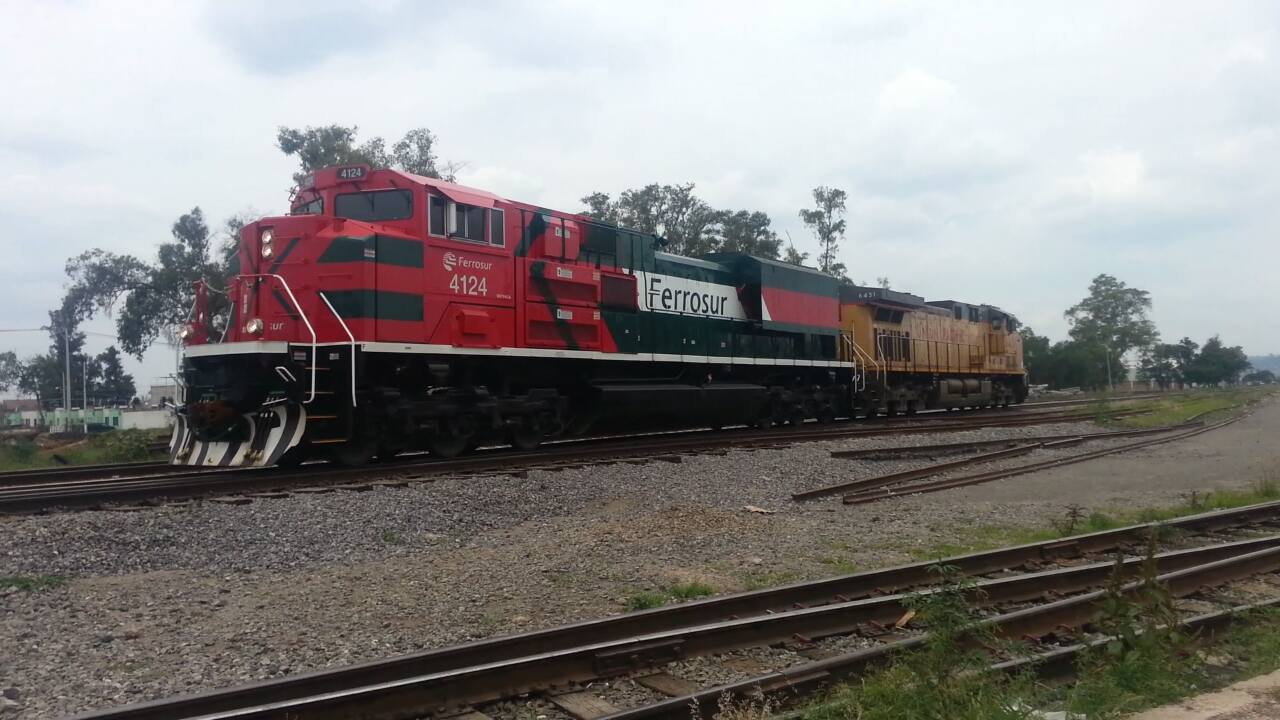
Ferrosur EMD SD70ACe locomotive 4124, equipped with experimental sheet-metal awnings over the radiator air intakes

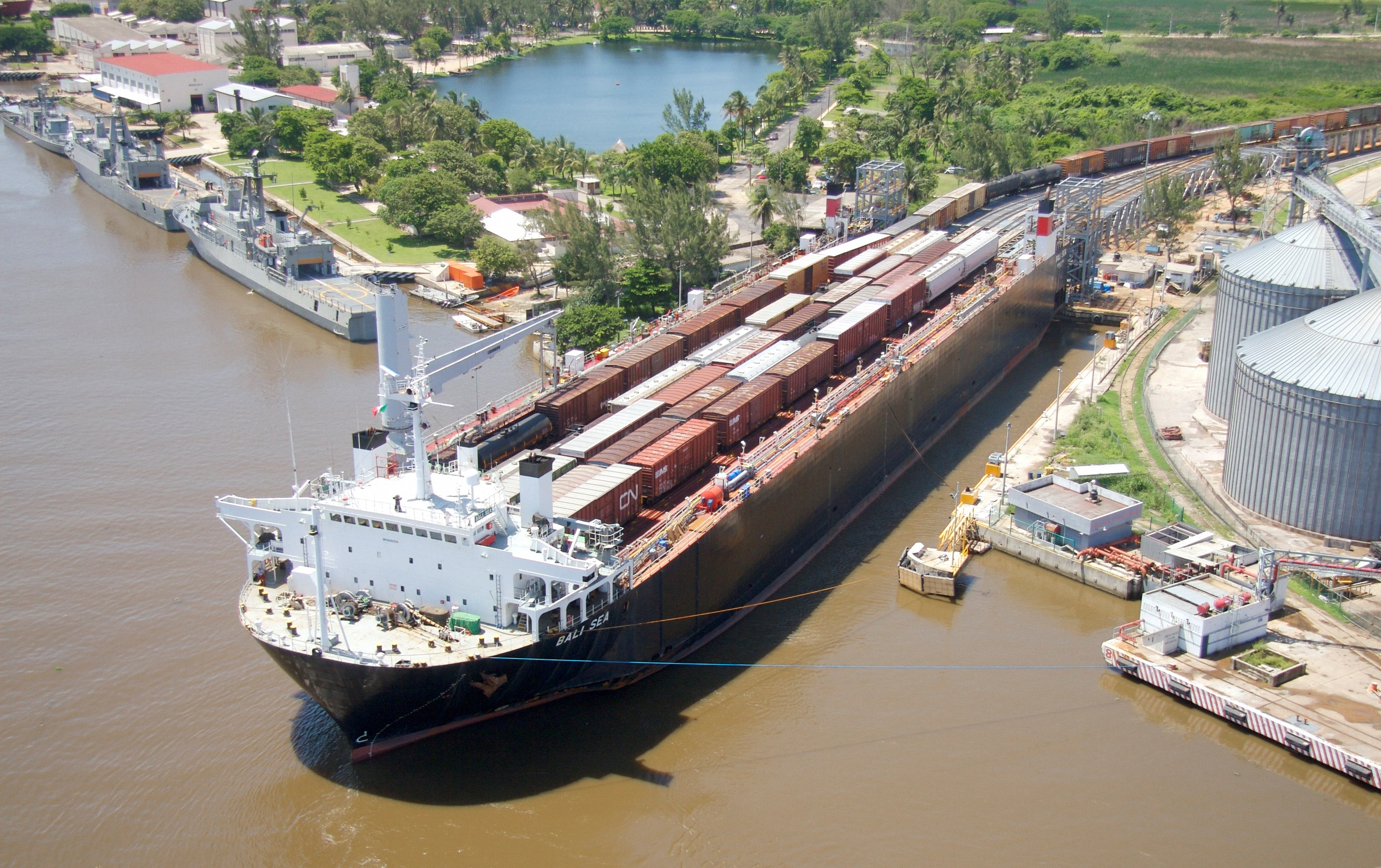
MV Bali Sea rail ferry transferring rail cars in Coatzacoalcos, Veracruz

=== Government occupation of railways ===
In May 2023, the Mexican Armed Forces occupied a portion of 127 kilometres (79 mi) of railways in Veracruz belonging to Ferrosur so that they could be used for the Interoceanic Corridor of the Isthmus of Tehuantepec, one of the government's most important megaprojects. The specific sections transferred were the El Chapo–Coatzacoalcos, Coatzacoalcos Medias Aguas, and Hibueras Minatitlán corridors. The railway infrastructure forming part of those sections was subsequently incorporated into the state-operated Interoceanic Railway of the Isthmus of Tehuantepec. President López Obrador inaugurated the first section of that railway, a 309-kilometre route known as Line Z connecting Coatzacoalcos on the Gulf of Mexico with Salina Cruz on the Pacific coast, on December 22, 2023. Mexican President Andrés Manuel López Obrador said that occurred "to avoid the risk of a future privatization of the railways and as a matter of national security and public interest."

The action was labeled as "unusual" and was seen as an expropriation. Secretariat of the Interior Adán Augusto López Hernández said that the action had been discussed with Grupo México, and he called it a "temporary occupation."

On late May 2023, several newspapers erroneously stated that the government of Mexico had paid Grupo Mexico 7 billion pesos for the occupation of the railway, 2.5 billion pesos lower than Groupo Mexico had wanted. However, López Obrador stated in a morning press conference on May 24 that sought to reach an agreement with Ferrosur not involving financial compensation. He wanted an agreement by which Ferrosur would pay a fee to use the occupied railways, and the Mexican Armed Forces would pay Ferrosur to use the railways heading to the port of Veracruz, in addition to a possible extension to a concession in exchange for the railways. An agreement was ultimately reached on the night of May 31 by which, as López Obrador had intended, the concession granted to Ferrosur in 1998 for the railways, which included the occupied sections, was extended by eight years and so it remains in force until 2056. Ferrosur would cover a fee corresponding to the right of way, and the state-owned Ferrocarril del Istmo de Tehuantepec company would be responsible for the costs and spendings for the railway's operation, maintenance, and optimal safety conditions of the railways and for their optimal safety conditions.

== Territory ==
Ferrosur operates the ports of Veracruz and Coatzacoalcos and SC Line between Veracruz and Mexico City. The line has numerous tunnels east of Acultzingo, including the longest one in Mexico. Ferrosur road locomotives are often seen coated in soot because they often pass through those tunnels.

== See also ==
- List of Mexican railroads
- Rail transport in Mexico
- CG Railway, which operates a train ferry connecting Ferrosur at the Port of Coatzacoalcos with Mobile, Alabama
