= EMD GP40-2 =

Class of diesel-electric locomotives

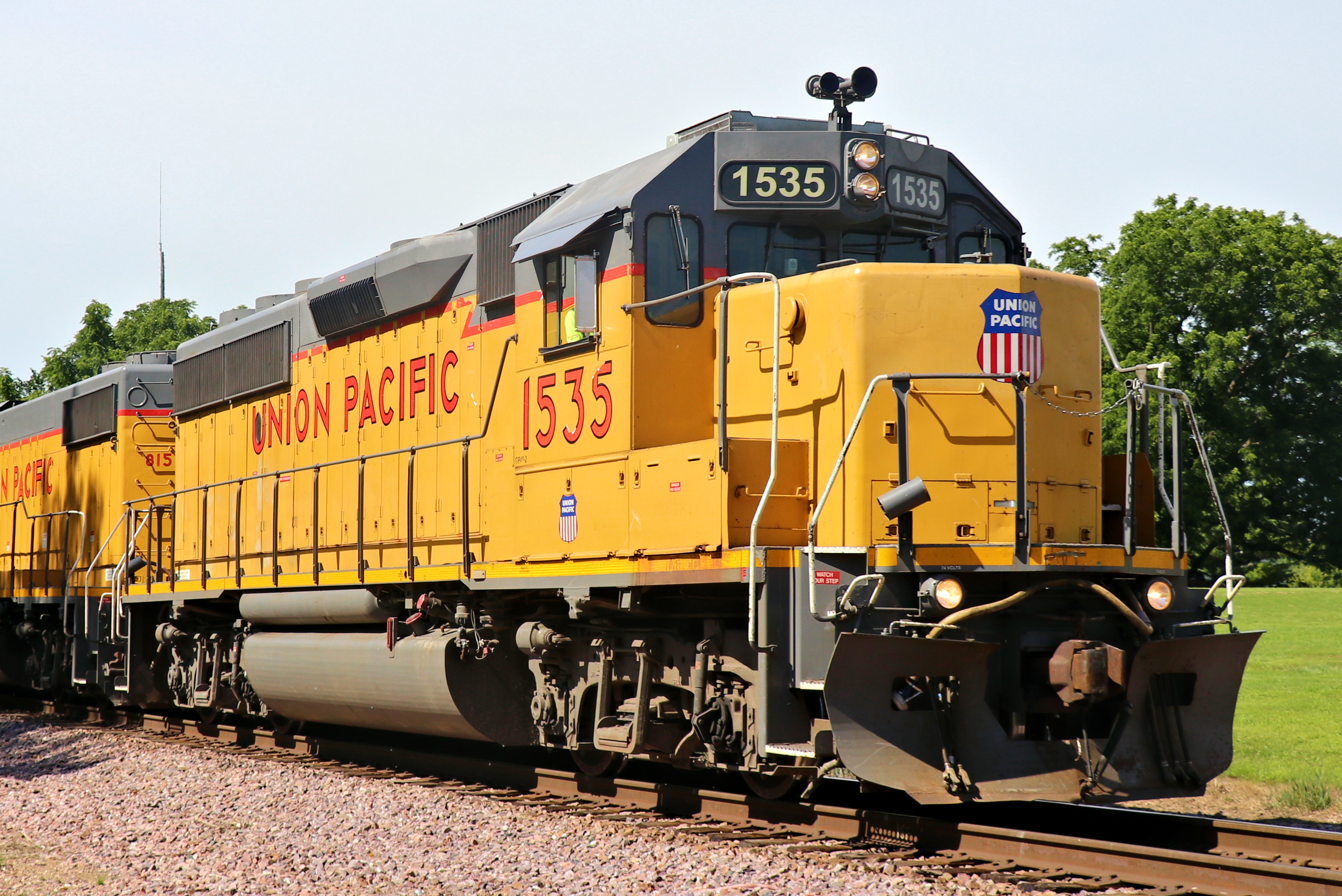
- A Union Pacific GP40-2 in Iowa Falls, Iowa
Type and origin
- Power type: Diesel-electric
- Builder: General Motors Electro-Motive Division; General Motors Diesel (GMD)
- Model: GP40-2, GP40-2LW, GP40P-2
- Build date: April 1972 – December 1986
- Total produced: 1,143
Specifications
- Configuration
  - AAR: B-B
  - UIC: Bo'Bo'
- Gauge: 4 ft 8 1/2 in (1,435 mm) standard gauge
- Wheel diameter: 40 in (1.016 m)
- Wheelbase: 43 ft (13.11 m)
- Length: 59 ft 2 in (18.03 m)
- Width: 10 ft 4 in (3.15 m)
- Height: 15 ft 5 in (4.70 m)
- Loco weight: 250,000 lb (113,398 kg)
- Prime mover: EMD 16-645E3
- Engine type: V16 diesel
- Aspiration: Turbocharged
- Cylinders: 16
Performance figures
- Maximum speed: 65 mph (105 km/h)
- Power output: 3,000 hp (2.24 MW)
- Tractive effort: 61,000 lbf (27,669 kgf)

The EMD GP40-2 is a 4-axle diesel-electric locomotive built by General Motors Electro-Motive Division as part of its Dash 2 line between April 1972 and December 1986. The locomotive's power is provided by an EMD 645E3 16-cylinder engine which generates 3,000 horsepower (2.24 MW).

== Production ==
Standard GP40-2 production totaled 861 units, with 817 built for U.S. railroads, 44 for Mexican railroads. Furthermore, 279 GP40-2s were built by General Motors Diesel (GMD) between 1974 and 1976. In addition, three GP40P-2s, passenger versions of the GP40-2, were built in 1974. Total production of the GP40-2 and its variations totaled 1,143 units.

== Performance ==
With the 62:15 gearing (65-70 mph maximum) EMD rated the GP40-2 at 55,400 lb continuous tractive effort. Some had PF21 module that reduced the output below 23 mph, lowering continuous speed down to 11 mph.

== Original buyers ==
Owner	Quantity	Numbers	Notes
Atlanta and West Point Rail Road	1	733	to Seaboard System Railroad to CSX
Alaska Railroad	15	3000–3005, 3007–3015	3000 renumbered to 3006
Baltimore and Ohio Railroad	218	4100–4162, 1977, GM50, 4185–4256, 4287–4311, 4322–4351, 4422–4447	Chessie System paint to CSX
Boston and Maine Railroad	18	300–317	
Chesapeake and Ohio Railway	95	4165–4184, 4262–4286, 4372–4421	Chessie System paint to CSX
Ferrocarril Chihuahua al Pacífico	29	1008–1036	
Conrail	124	3280–3403	To CSX and Norfolk Southern Railway,
Denver and Rio Grande Western Railroad	37	3094–3130	All to Union Pacific Railroad.
U.S. Department of Transportation	1	003	
Detroit, Toledo and Ironton Railroad	20	406–425	to Grand Trunk Western Railroad 6406–6425.
Florida East Coast Railway	24	411–434	433–434 were last built
Georgia Railroad	2	755–756	to Seaboard System Railroad to CSX
Kansas City Southern Railway	4	796–799	
Louisville and Nashville Railroad	17	6600–6616	Family Lines Paint, to Seaboard System Railroad to CSX
Reading Company	5	3671–3675	to Conrail
Richmond, Fredericksburg and Potomac Railroad	7	141–147	to CSX
St. Louis – San Francisco Railway ("Frisco")	25	750–774	to Burlington Northern 3040–3064
St. Louis Southwestern Railway ("Cotton Belt")	56	7248–7273, 7628–7657	
Seaboard Coast Line Railroad	25	1636–1656. 6617–6621	6617–6621 Family Lines paint; all to Seaboard System Railroad now CSX
Ferrocarril Sonora-Baja California	15	2104–2112, 2309–2314	2104-2112 have High short hoods w/steam generator for passenger service only GP40-2 built with high short hoods
Southern Pacific Transportation Company	68	7240–7247, 7608–7627, 7658–7677, 7940–7959	
Texas, Oklahoma and Eastern Railroad	3	D15–D16, D20	
Western Maryland Railway	35	4257–4261, 4312–4321, 4352–4371	Chessie System paint to CSX
Western Pacific Railroad	15	3545–3559	
Western Railway of Alabama	1	708	to Seaboard System Railroad to CSX
Total	861		

GP40-2LW

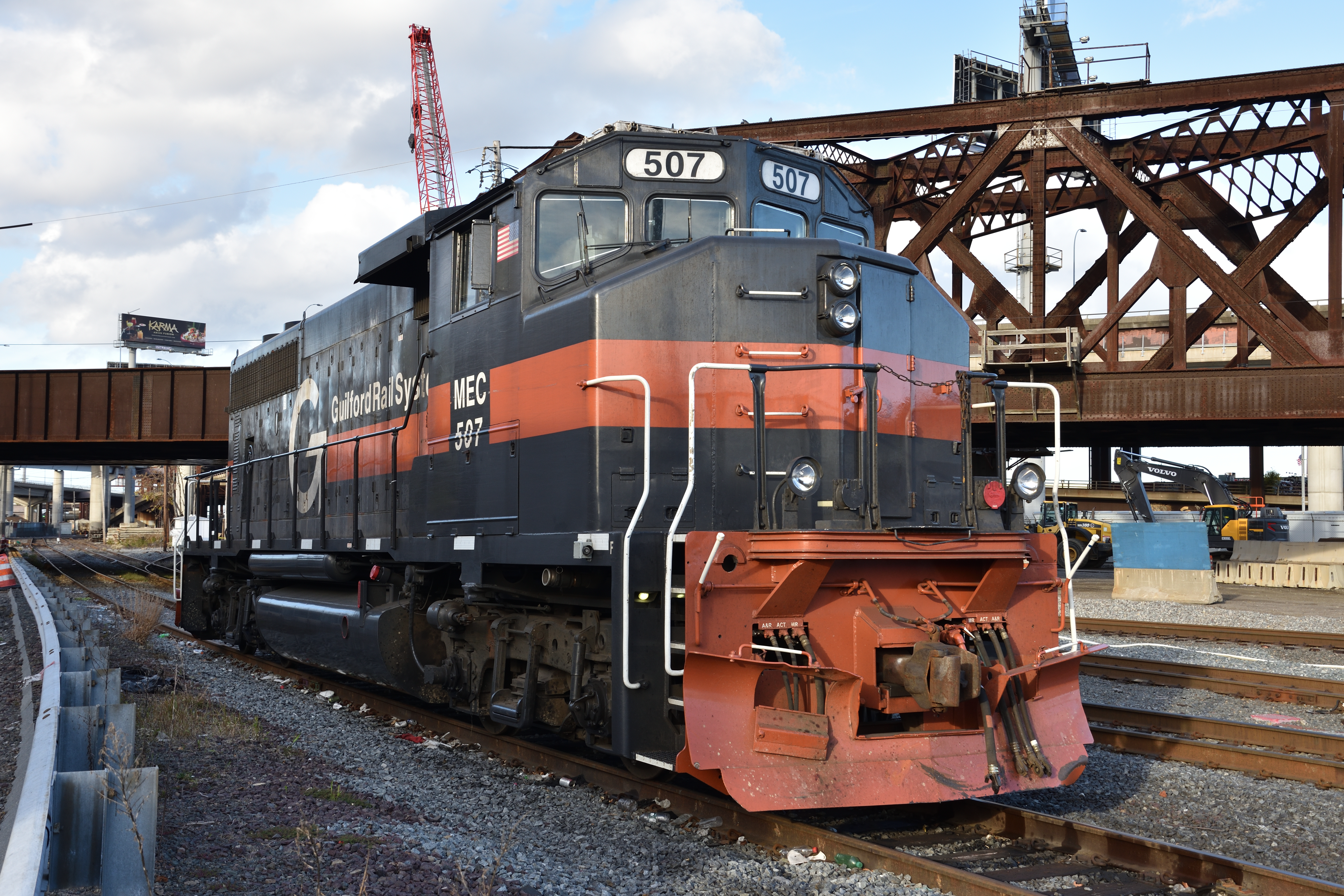
MEC 507, a GP40-2LW locomotive. This locomotive was originally built for CN but later sold.

Railroad	Quantity	Road numbers	Notes
Canadian National Railway	268	CN 9400–9667, 9668–9677	CN 9400–9632 are GP40-2L, 9633–9677 are GP40-2W. CN 9668–9677 are former GO Transit units purchased in 1991.
GO Transit	11	GO 700–710	Ten to CN 9668–9677 in 1991. One (703) to Miami Tri-Rail, later sold to Aberdeen, Carolina & Western #703.
Total	279		

GP40P-2

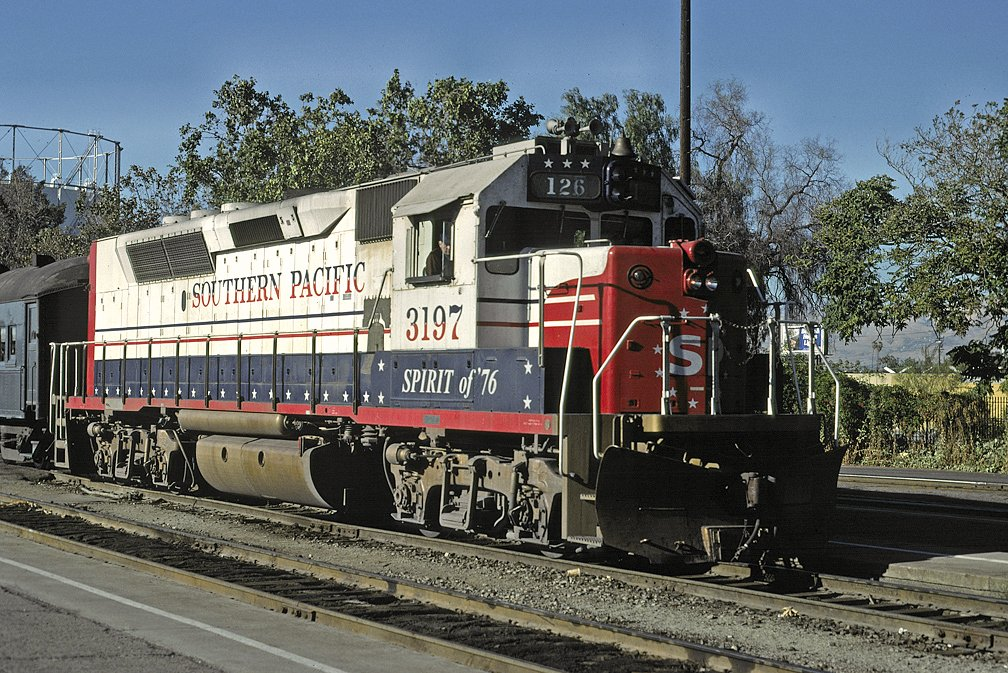
SP GP40P-2 #3197

Railroad	Quantity	Road numbers	Notes
Southern Pacific Transportation Company	3	3197-3199	Renumbered to 7600-7602. 7601 and 7602 went to UP as 1373 & 1375. 7600 went to IHB as 4010
Total	3		

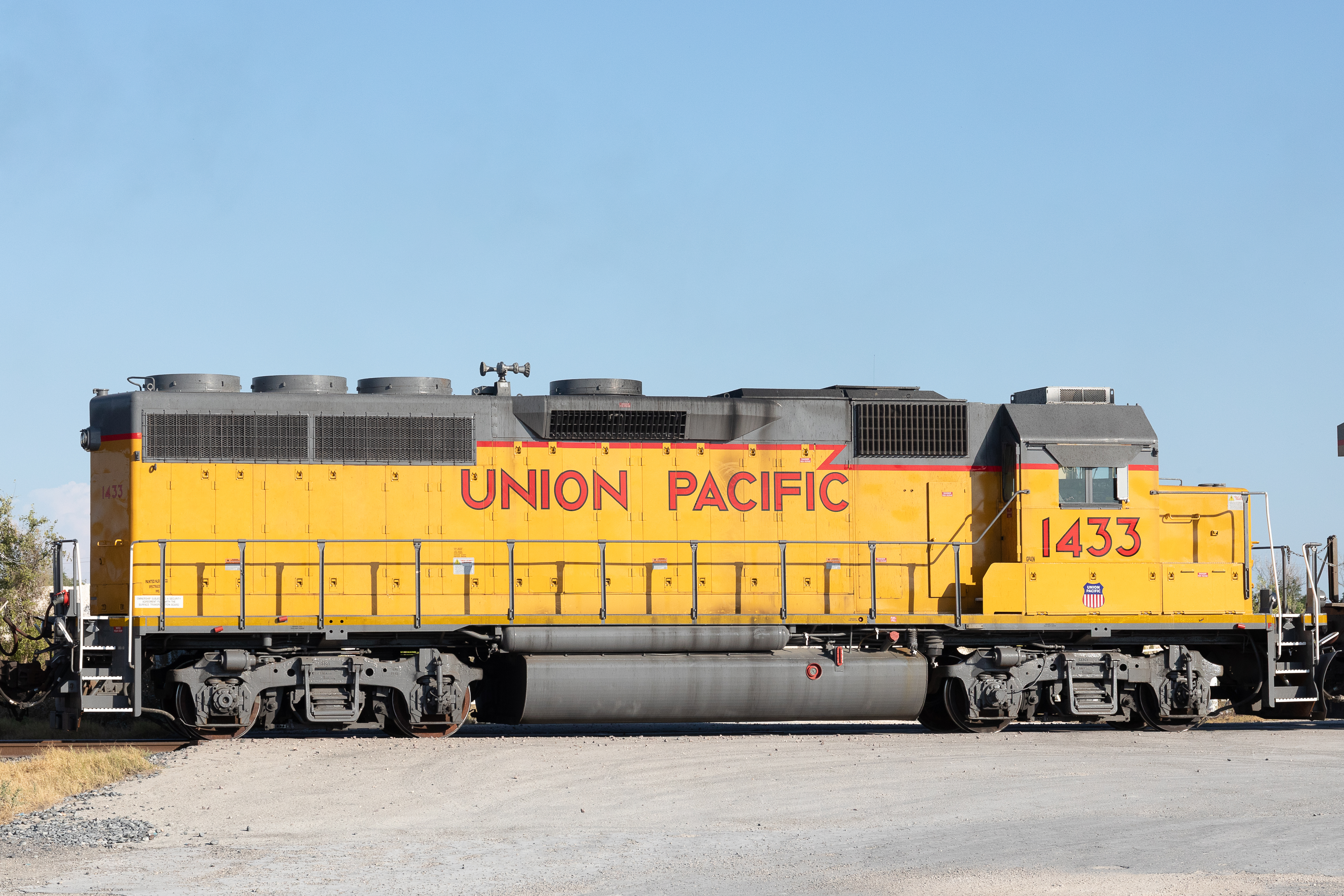
Union Pacific GP40N #1433 in McNeil, Texas.

== Rebuilds ==
Union Pacific has rebuilt 129 of their GP40's and GP40-2's into GP40N's at their Jenk's shop. These units received a microprocessor control system to increase adhesion, control options, and extend the life of the locomotive.

CSX has rebuilt only one GP40-2 locomotive, numbered 6041 (originally BO 4141), into a hydrogen fuel cell locomotive in collaboration with CPKC on April 16, 2024. The unit's road number is 2100, and classified as GP38H2. The railroad also rebuilt a handful of GP40-2 into GP40-3s, which features new cabs, new electronics, and other internal differences.

== Preservation ==
- Ferrocarril Sonora Baja California (SBC) #2107 is preserved at the Museo Sol del Niño in Mexicali, Baja California.

== See also ==
- List of GM-EMD locomotives
- List of GMD Locomotives
- Peacekeeper Rail Garrison, one ex-CSX GP40-2 was acquired by the United States Air Force and modified for a proposed rail-based ICBM system.
