= Port of Mobile =

Sea port in Alabama

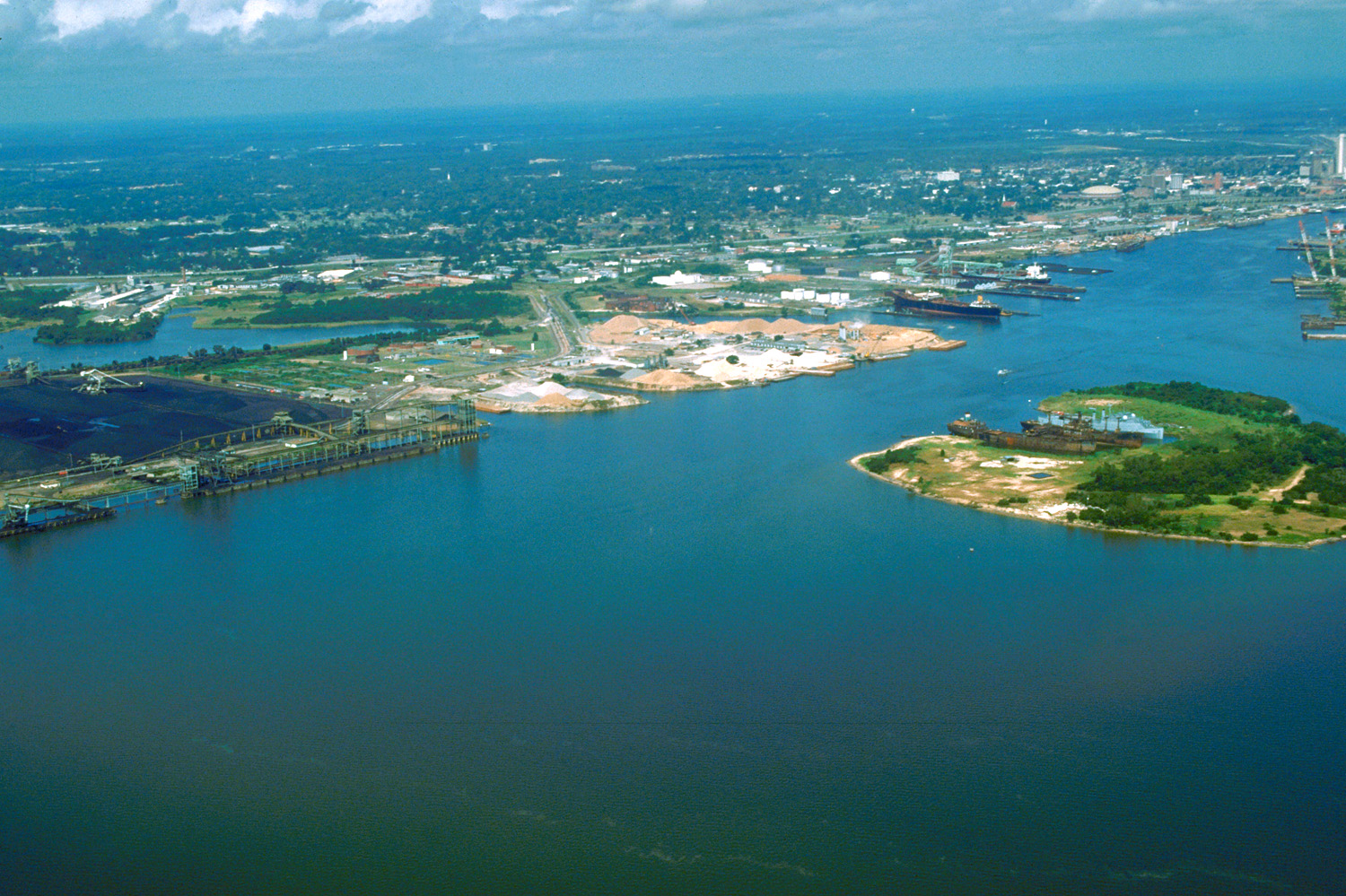
- Aerial view of the port of Mobile, Alabama
- Interactive map of Port of Mobile
- Location in USA

Location
- Country: United States
- Location: Mobile, Alabama
- Coordinates: 30.71217°N 88.04331°W
- UN/LOCODE: USMOB

Details
- No. of berths: 42
- Draft depth: 45 ft. (50 ft by Q1 2025)

Statistics
- Website alports.com

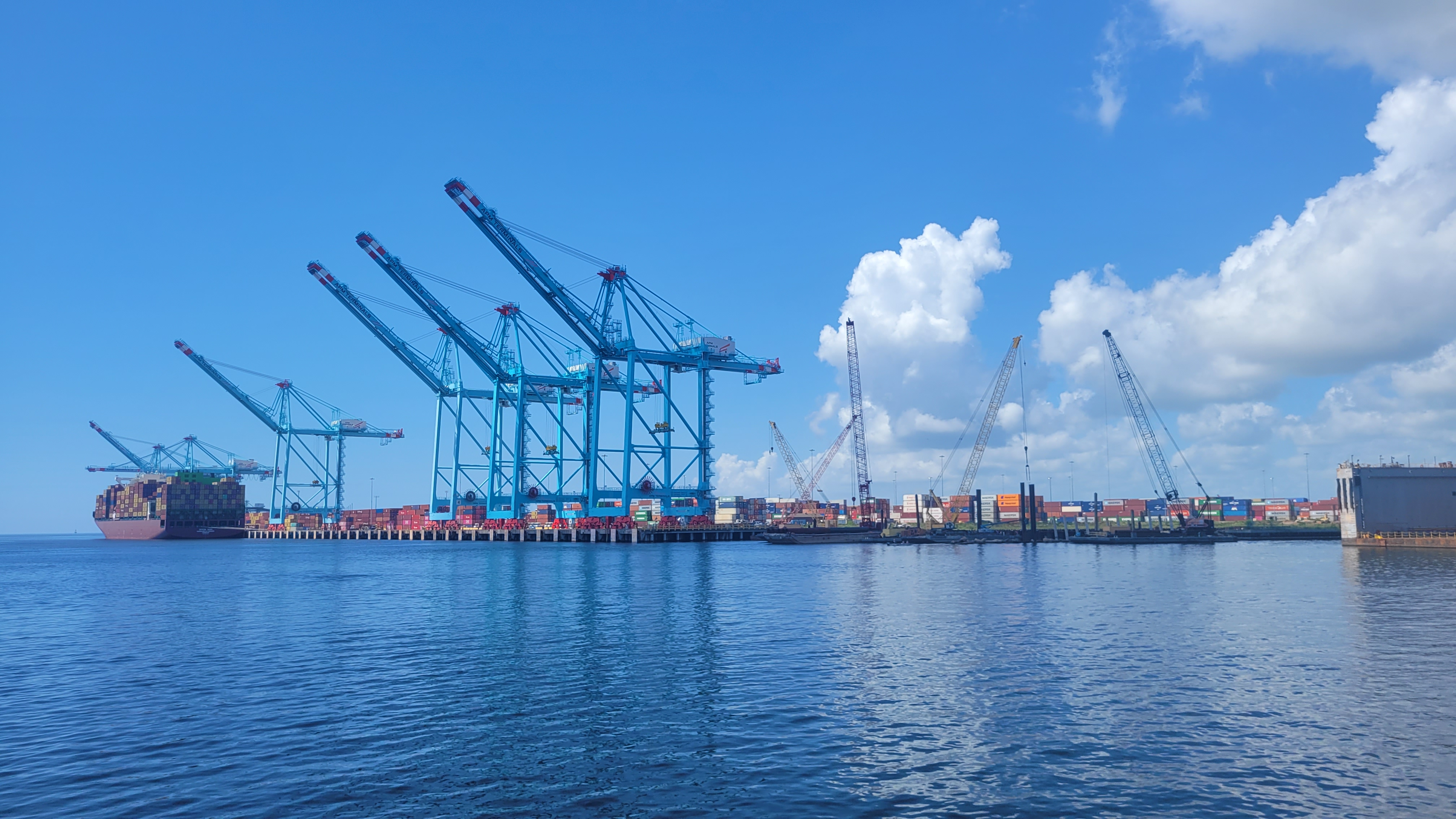
Cranes at the Port of Mobile container terminal.

The Port of Mobile is a deep-water port in Mobile, Alabama, United States. It is the only deep-water port in Alabama. It was ranked by the United States Army Corps of Engineers as the 9th largest port by tonnage in the nation during 2014, with a trade volume of 64.3 million tons. This ranking had increased from 12th largest during 2010, with a trade volume of 55,713,273 tons, an increase of 19.1%.

The port is located along the Mobile River where it empties into Mobile Bay. The Port of Mobile has public, deepwater terminals with direct access to 1,500 miles of inland and intracoastal waterways serving the Great Lakes, the Ohio and Tennessee river valleys (via the Tennessee-Tombigbee Waterway), and the Gulf of Mexico. The Alabama State Port Authority owns and operates the public terminals at the Port of Mobile. The public terminals handle containerized, bulk, break bulk, roll-on/roll-off, and heavy lift cargoes. The port is also home to private bulk terminal operators. The container, general cargo and bulk facilities have immediate access to two interstate systems and five Class I railroads. Additionally, the CG Railway operates from the port as a rail ferry service to Coatzacoalcos, Veracruz, in Mexico.

The Port of Mobile is the largest break bulk forest products port in the United States, and the Alabama State Port Authority's McDuffie Terminal is one of the largest coal terminals in the United States and largest import coal terminal. The port was the fourth largest exporter of coal during 2012, with the majority exported for metallurgical processes. The largest shares of coal exports from Mobile went to Europe and South America.

The Alabama State Port Authority announced in 2010 that $360 million would be spent over the following five years to improve infrastructure at the port. Improvements included land acquisition, new rail and inter-modal yards, cargo terminal improvements and enhancements to improve servicing of deep-water oil and gas field vessels and equipment Since 2000, the Port Authority has undergone nearly $500 million in capital improvements and expansion projects to serve containerized, bulk and break bulk commodities. Improvements include a new rail ferry terminal, a steel terminal to service the $4.6 billion steel facility in Calvert, Alabama, new warehousing, a new container terminal, and expansions at the McDuffie Coal Terminal. The Port of Mobile had an estimated statewide economic impact approaching $8 billion annually in 2010.

In 2022, a statue of retiring U.S. Senator Richard Shelby was unveiled at the port. As a senator, Shelby steered millions of dollars in federal money to the port for dredging and widening.

== Cruise traffic ==
Carnival Cruise Lines has been operating cruises out of Mobile since 2001 with a Holiday-class cruise ship. In 2003 Carnival Holiday was positioned at the port. The city has attempted to grab more cruise lines to place a ship at the port. Carnival left Mobile in 2011 due to rising fuel costs, and the inability to raise prices. Carnival Fantasy was positioned in 2016 to do year around cruises, and adventure cruises. In January 2022 the Carnival Fascination will replace the fantasy offering more year around cruises out of Mobile.

== See also ==
- List of ports in the United States
- United States container ports
