= Benjamín Hill, Sonora =

Benjamín Hill
- Location within Mexico
- Coordinates: 30°10′N 111°07′W
- Country: Mexico
- State: Sonora
- Municipality: Benjamín Hill
- Founded: 1942
- Municipality created: 1952

Government

Area
  - Total: 854.70 km^{2} (330.00 sq mi)
- Elevation: 853 m (2,799 ft)

Population (2020)
  - Total: 4,988
- (municipal total)
- Time zone: UTC–07:00 (Zona Pacífico)

Benjamín Hill is the municipal seat of Benjamín Hill Municipality in the Mexican state of Sonora.

== Geography ==
There are municipal boundaries with Santa Ana in the northeast, Opodepe in the south, and Trincheras in the west. The elevation of the municipal seat is 853 meters above sea level. Most of the land is flat, desert land with no permanent water courses.

=== Climate ===
The climate is hot and dry with average summer maximums of 31.6 °C and average winter minimums of 13.8 °C. The average annual temperature is 22.5 °C.

Climate data for Benjamín Hill, Sonora (1991–2020 normals, extremes 1969–present)
Month	Jan	Feb	Mar	Apr	May	Jun	Jul	Aug	Sep	Oct	Nov	Dec	Year
Record high °C (°F)	36 (97)	39 (102)	41 (106)	42 (108)	46 (115)	48 (118)	49 (120)	48 (118)	48 (118)	43 (109)	40 (104)	36 (97)	49 (120)
Mean daily maximum °C (°F)	20.8 (69.4)	22.5 (72.5)	26.3 (79.3)	29.7 (85.5)	34.4 (93.9)	39.3 (102.7)	39.2 (102.6)	38.2 (100.8)	37.3 (99.1)	33.3 (91.9)	27.4 (81.3)	20.1 (68.2)	30.7 (87.3)
Daily mean °C (°F)	14.1 (57.4)	15.5 (59.9)	18.1 (64.6)	21.4 (70.5)	25.5 (77.9)	30.3 (86.5)	30.5 (86.9)	30.0 (86.0)	28.9 (84.0)	25.2 (77.4)	19.5 (67.1)	13.4 (56.1)	22.7 (72.9)
Mean daily minimum °C (°F)	7.5 (45.5)	8.6 (47.5)	10.0 (50.0)	13.0 (55.4)	16.6 (61.9)	21.2 (70.2)	21.7 (71.1)	21.8 (71.2)	20.6 (69.1)	17.2 (63.0)	11.7 (53.1)	6.7 (44.1)	14.7 (58.5)
Record low °C (°F)	−10 (14)	−9 (16)	−1 (30)	1 (34)	3 (37)	5 (41)	11 (52)	10 (50)	8 (46)	2 (36)	−8 (18)	−10 (14)	−10 (14)
Average precipitation mm (inches)	19.6 (0.77)	18.9 (0.74)	14.0 (0.55)	2.5 (0.10)	1.0 (0.04)	16.4 (0.65)	97.7 (3.85)	106.4 (4.19)	59.1 (2.33)	16.0 (0.63)	18.0 (0.71)	20.5 (0.81)	390.1 (15.36)
Average rainy days	3.4	2.8	1.8	0.2	0.4	1.8	9.6	9.4	4.7	2.0	2.2	2.9	41.2
Source: Servicio Meteorológico Nacional

== Economy ==
Agricultural activity is modest with only 747 hectares registered in 2005. The main crops are wheat, corn and grasses for cattle fodder.

There is cattle raising with over 13,000 head counted in 2005. Calves are often exported to the United States of America.

The industrial sector shows potential with several small industries located in an industrial park. Proximity to the important Federal Highway 15 could stimulate this sector in the future.

== History ==
Benjamín Hill owes its existence to the railroad. In 1939 it was just a ranch called San Fernando when the federal government chose it for the junction of the Ferrocarril Sonora-Baja California and the Ferrocarril Sud-Pacífico railways, which was finished in 1948. It was given municipal status in 1952. The name is derived from Benjamín Hill, the Sinaloan military leader whom President Venustiano Carranza appointed Governor of Sonora in 1914.
