= Ferrocarril del Pacífico =

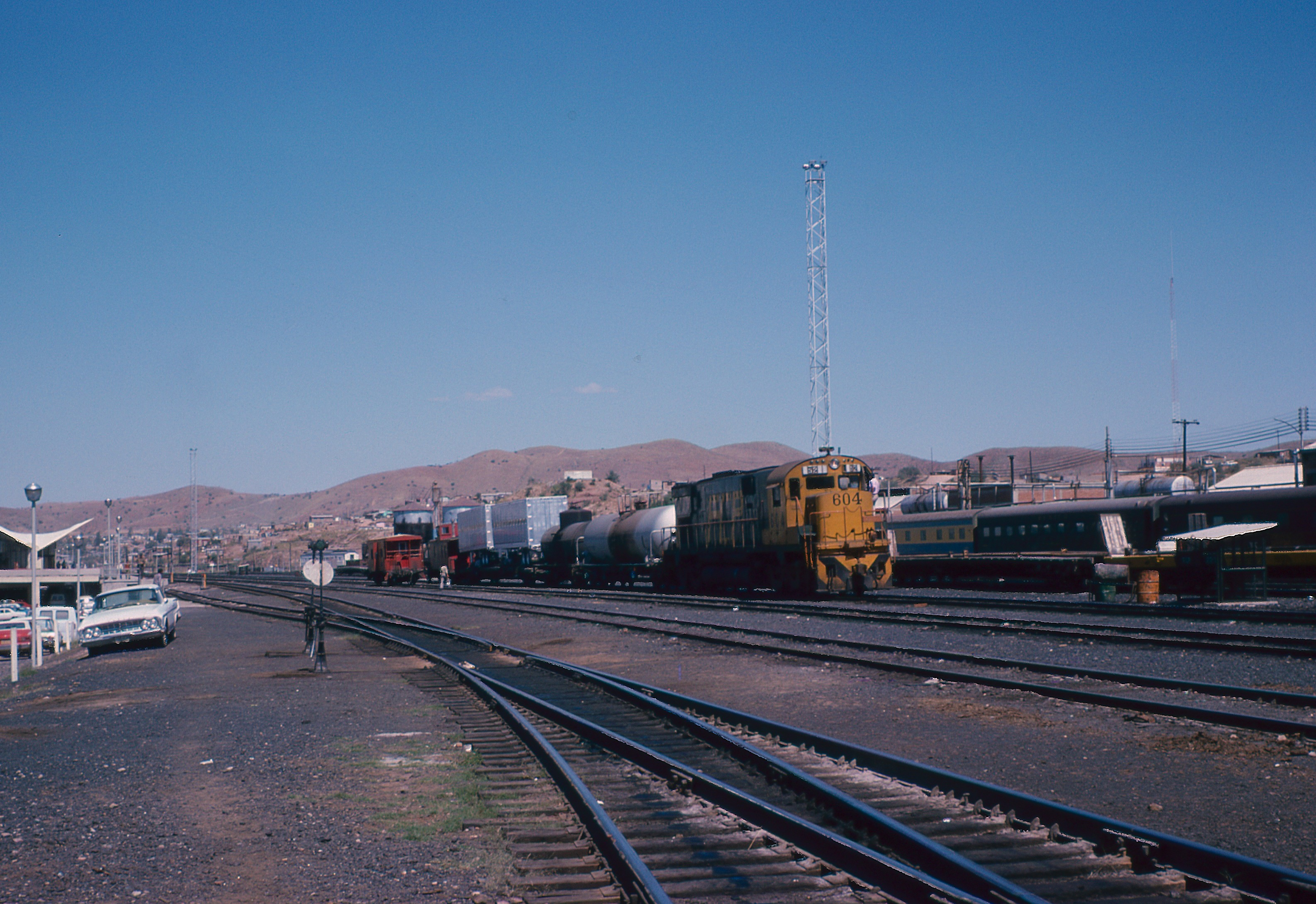
- FCP #604, an ALCO Century 628, leads a short freight through Nogales in 1975.

Overview
- Reporting mark: FCP
- Locale: Sonora/Jalisco
- Dates of operation: 1950–1987
- Predecessor: Southern Pacific Railroad of Mexico
- Successor: Ferrocarriles Nacionales de México

Technical
- Track gauge: 1,435 mm (4 ft 8 1/2 in) standard gauge

The Ferrocarril del Pacífico is a former railroad line company of Mexico that operated from Nogales, Sonora to Guadalajara, Jalisco via Mazatlán, Sinaloa.

It ran passenger trains between these points: El Yaqui and Mexicali, Nogales, Sonora -- Guadalajara, Jalisco via Benjamín Hill, Sonora and Mazatlán, Sinaloa; and shorter routes: Mazatlán - Naco and Guadalajara - San Marcos.

It was absorbed into Ferrocarriles Nacionales de México in 1984.

== See also ==
- List of Mexican railroads
- Ferrocarriles Nacionales de Mexico
- Southern Pacific Railroad
- Ferrocarril Sonora-Baja California
- Ferrocarril Chihuahua al Pacifico
- Ferromex
