= MV Bali Sea =

Ro-ro rail ferry/heavy lift ship

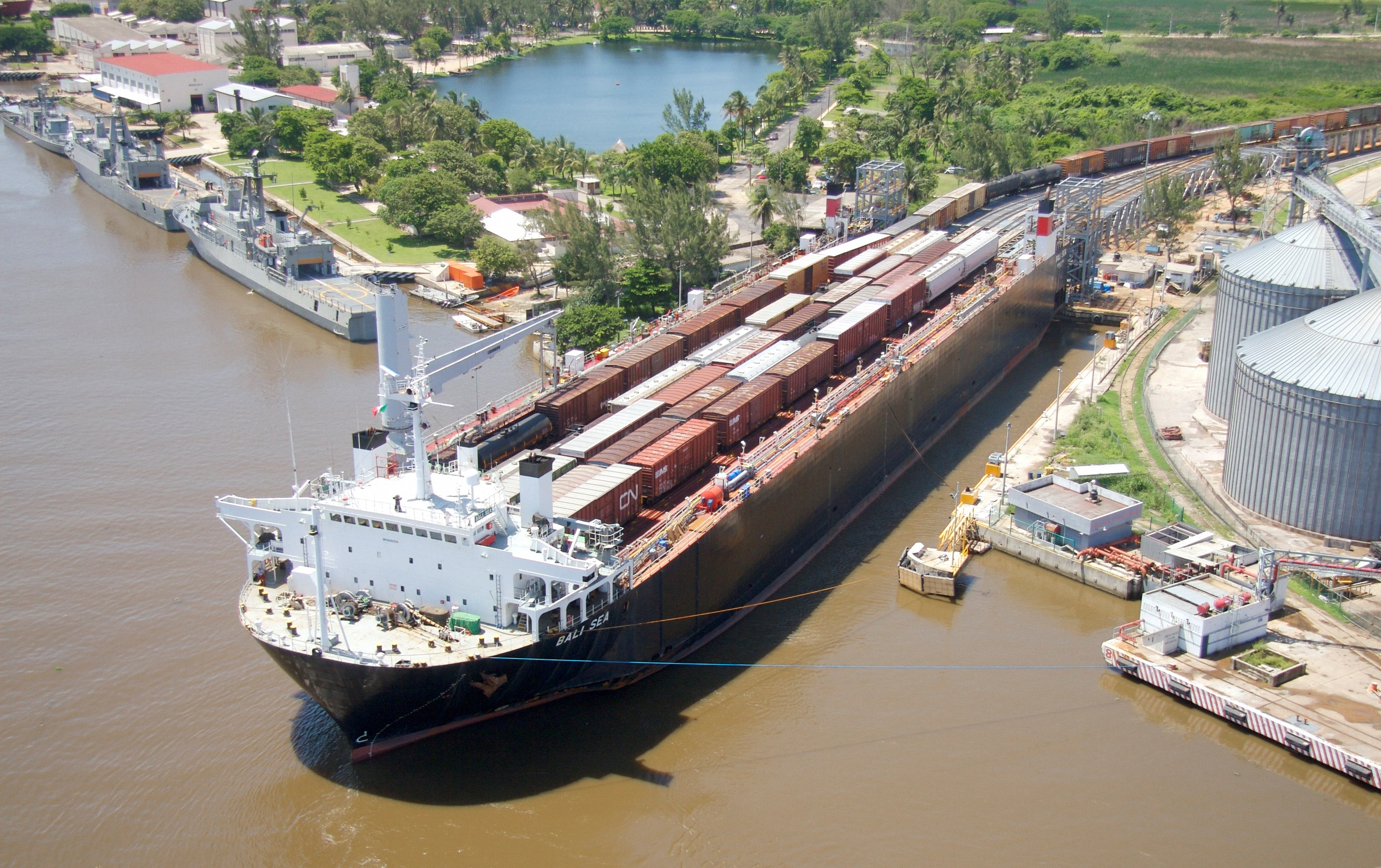
- Bali Sea with loading up with ferrosur trains at Coatzacoalcos

History
- Name: Bali Sea
- Operator: Frigg Shipping (1982–1985); Wijsmuller Transport/Dockwise (1985–1995); Gulf South Shipping/CG Railway (1995–2021)
- Builder: Mitsubishi Heavy Industries
- Launched: 25 December 1981
- Completed: 1982
- In service: 1982
- Out of service: 2021
- Renamed: From Dan Lifter in 1985, from Super Servant 5 in 1995
- Identification: Call sign: D6A2872; IMO number: 8106068
- Fate: Scrapped 4 July 2021

General characteristics
- Tonnage: 24,201 GT; 15,547 NT; 76,061 DWT
- Length: 175.4 m (575 ft 6 in)
- Beam: 35.8 m (117 ft 5 in)
- Draught: 4.6 m (15 ft 1 in)
- Speed: 20.5 knots (38.0 km/h; 23.6 mph)

MV Bali Sea was a roll-on/roll-off rail ferry, previously a heavy-lift ship. It started its life recovering ships and moving oil platforms, undergoing several name changes in the process. It became a rail ferry in 2000, shipping trains across the Gulf of Mexico. In 2021, when new ferries were introduced, Bali Sea was taken out of service and sent to the Alang Ship Breaking Yard in Gujarat, India for scrapping.

== History ==
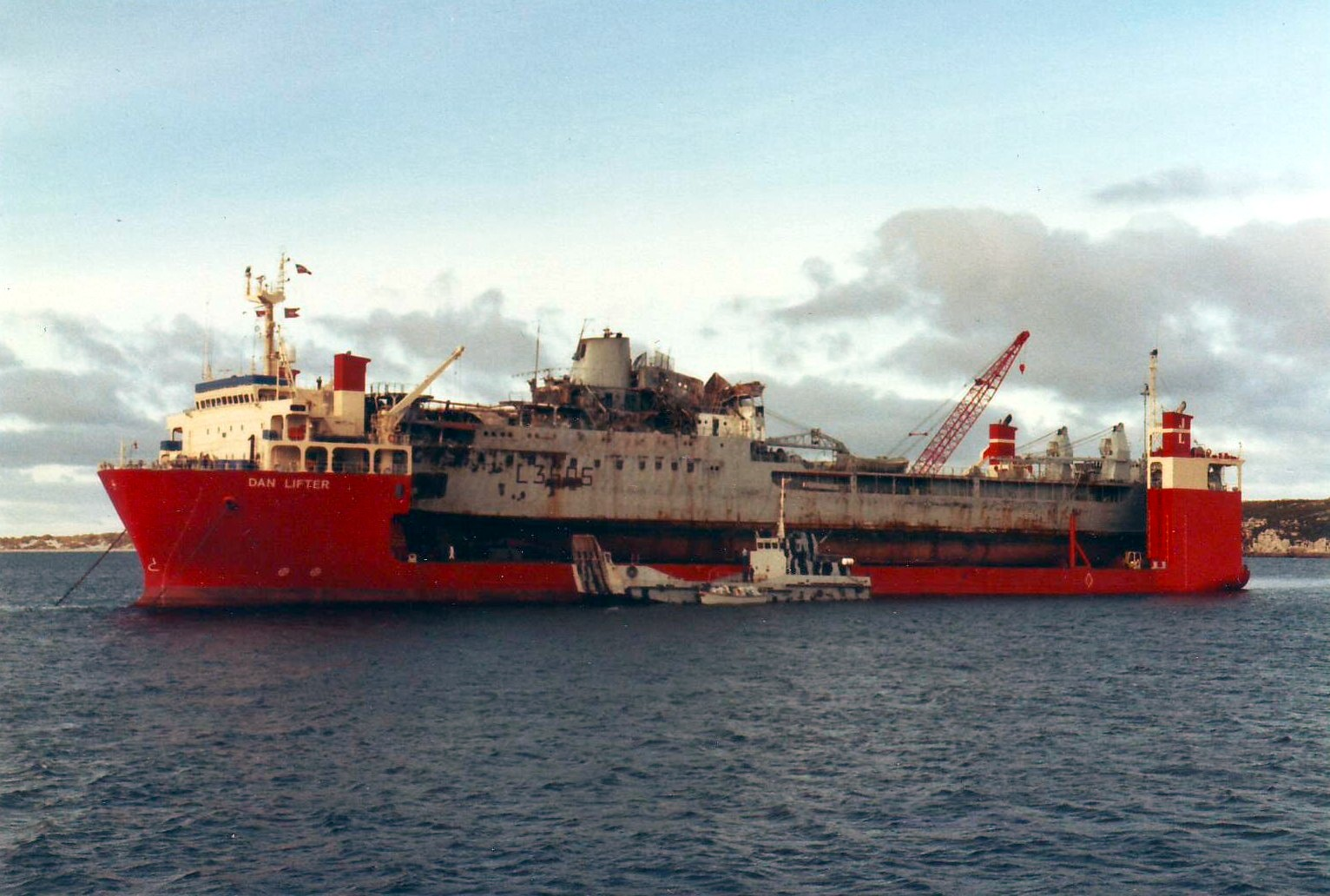
Dan Lifter carrying the crippled RFA Sir Tristram in 1982

The ship, a semi-submersible heavy-lift ship at the time, was christened sometime in 1981 with the name Dan Lifter and was sent into service with Frigg Shipping Ltd. in 1982. A year later, it recovered RFA Sir Tristram after the Falklands War. In 1985, it was acquired by Wijsmuller Transport with the name Super Servant 5 to move oil platforms. It stayed with Wijsmuller for ten years, before being transferred to Gulf South Shipping, who passed the recently renamed Bali Sea to CG Railway. It operated as a rail ferry between Coatzacoalcos in Mexico and Mobile, Alabama, on a 900-mile (1,400 km) route, carrying a maximum of 115 rail cars. In 2019, Bali Sea was showing its age. As a result, new ferries were ordered from China, both of which arrived in 2021. With the arrival of the first, MV Cherokee, Bali Sea was renamed Bala, sailed to Nhava Sheva, and decommissioned.
