= Cazadero and San Pablo Railroad =

Mexican railway

Overview
- Locale: Mexico
- Dates of operation: 1922–
- Predecessors: Ferrocarril Cazadero La Torre y Tepetongo; Ferrocarril Cazadero y Solis

Technical
- Track gauge: 2 ft (610 mm)
- Length: 60 kilometers (37 mi)

Cazadero and San Pablo Railroad was a 60-kilometer (37 mi), 2 ft (610 mm) narrow gauge line built in 1896 as the Ferrocarril Cazadero La Torre y Tepetongo from an interchange with the Mexican Central Railroad (Ferrocarril Central Mexicano -- Ferrocarriles Nacionales de México after 1909) at Cazadero La Torre southwest through Nado to the sawmill community of San Pablo in Estado de México.

Passenger service began to Nado in 1897. The line was reorganized as the Ferrocarril Cazadero y Solis in 1906.

Lumbering and railroad operations were suspended during the Mexican Revolution; but the line resumed operations in 1922 as the Ferrocarril Cazadero y San Pablo. Thirty kilometers (18.6 mi) of logging branches were constructed around San Pablo. The forests were completely harvested, and operations ceased after World War II.

Three locomotives surviving the revolution were sold to sugar plantations, but rails remained in place for another decade.

== Locomotives ==
Number	Builder	Type	Date	Works number	Notes
1	Orenstein & Koppel	0-6-0T	1936		Vendida a Ferrocarril Cementero Cruz Azul
2	Baldwin Locomotive Works	0-4-4T			
3	Baldwin Locomotive Works	2-6-2T	8/1896	14992	
4	Baldwin Locomotive Works	2-6-2T	4/1896	14798	sold Ignacio San Francisco #4 rebuilt to 2 ft 6 in (762 mm) gauge
5	Baldwin Locomotive Works	2-6-2T	4/1896	14799	sold Ignacio San Francisco #5 rebuilt to 2 ft 6 in (762 mm) gauge
6	Baldwin Locomotive Works	2-6-2T	8/1896	14976	sold Compania La Primavera #1
7	Baldwin Locomotive Works	2-6-0	5/1897	15327	similar design to Sandy River Railroad #6 and #7 (2nd #2 & 2nd #3)
