= Ferrocarriles Unidos de Yucatán =

Narrow-gauge railroad in Yucatán, Mexico

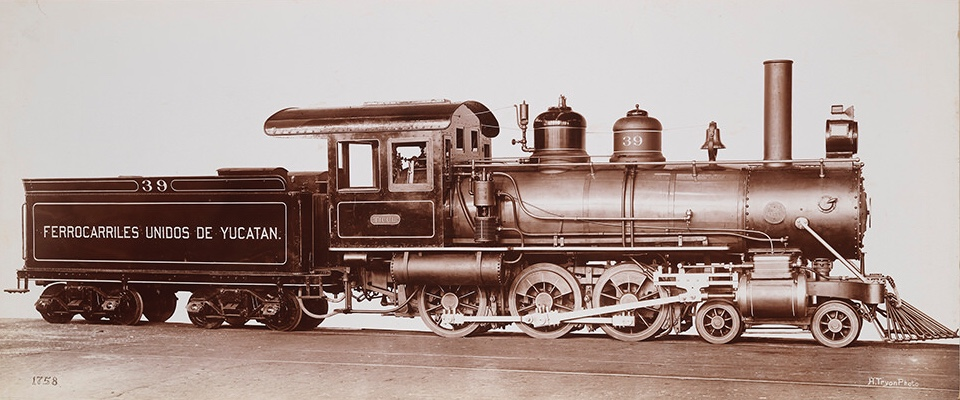
A typical Baldwin 4-6-0 of the railway

Ferrocarriles Unidos de Yucatán (UdeY) was a 3 ft (914 mm) narrow gauge railroad that operated in the states of Yucatán and Campeche in Mexico from 1902 to 1975.

== History ==
The Ferrocarriles Unidos de Yucatán (United Railways of Yucatan) was founded on November 1, 1902, by the merger of three railroads; F. C. Merida a Valladolid, F. C. Merida a Calkini, and F. C. Merida a Peto, operating in the Yucatán Peninsula.

The last two 4-4-0 steam locomotives (Nos. 80 and 81) built by Baldwin Locomotive Works were made for this railroad in 1946. Locals nicknamed its locomotives as toros de fuego (bulls of fire).

Other than a standard gauge line between Yucatán's capital city of Mérida and the port of Progreso, all lines in the Peninsula were narrow gauge. In 1950, rail lines were finally connected from the rest of Mexico, which used 4 ft 8 1/2 in (1,435 mm) standard gauge. After the rail unification, the FUdeY line between Merida and Campeche and thence the rest of Mexico was converted to standard. In 1975, the company was merged into Ferrocarriles Unidos del Sureste.

== Disney connection ==
Five of the railroad's steam locomotives were bought by Roger Broggie on behalf of The Walt Disney Company in 1969. Four of them, which were built by Baldwin Locomotive Works between 1916 and 1928, were completely rebuilt and significantly altered to resemble locomotives built in the 1880s. Additionally, their fireboxes were modified to burn ultra-low-sulfur No. 2 diesel oil as opposed to bunker oil and wood. They are currently operating on the Walt Disney World Railroad (WDWRR) circling Walt Disney World's Magic Kingdom park in Bay Lake, Florida. The remaining locomotive, built in 1902 by ALCO's Pittsburgh works, was deemed to be in too poor condition to be restored to operation, thus it was used as a parts source to repair the four Baldwin locomotives before being sold to an unknown locomotive broker in the mid-1980s, and is presumed to have been scrapped.

== Bibliography ==
- Best, Gerald M. (1968). Mexican Narrow Gauge (1st ed.). Howell-North Books. ISBN 978-0831070731.
- Leaphart, David (2016). Walt Disney World Railroads Part 3: Yucatan Jewels (1st ed.). Steel Wheel on Steel Rail Studio. ISBN 978-1-533-03707-7.
