= Inter-California Railway =

Former railroad line of the United States and Mexico

Inter-California Railway Ferrocarril Inter-California
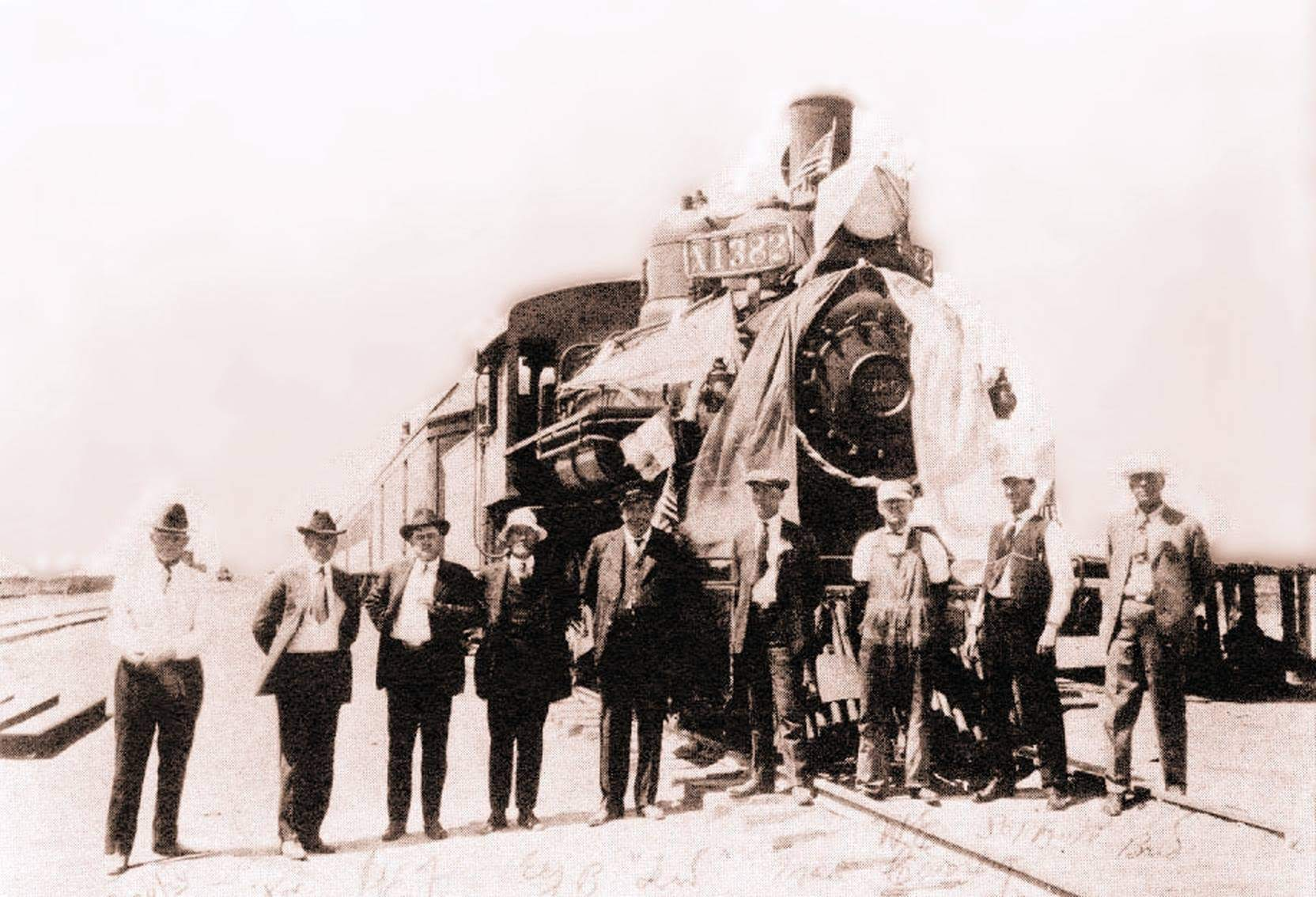
- Executives of the Inter-California Railway, 1906

Overview
- Main region(s): The Californias (California and Baja California)
- Headquarters: American headquarters: San Francisco, California; Mexican headquarters: Mexicali, Baja California
- Dates of operation: 15 June 1904–1960

The Inter-California Railway, known in Spanish as the Ferrocarril Inter-California, also known as the Inter-Cal, is a former railroad line which connected the Californias by train. It operated between the American state of California and the Mexican state of Baja California.

== History ==
The Inter-California Railway was incorporated on 15 June 1904, as a subsidiary of Southern Pacific Railroads.

In 1929, the Mexicali and Gulf Railway was reorganized as the southern line of Inter-Cal.

Inter-Cal's lines in Mexico became the Ferrocarril Sonora-Baja California in 1960.

Souther Pacific was later acquired by Union Pacific. Inter-Cal's line from Niland to Calexico remains in operation as UP's Calexico Subdivision, interchanging with Ferromex at the US-Mexico borer.

== Lines ==
=== Main line ===
The Inter-California Railway's northern terminus was in Niland, California, where the line connected to the Sunset line of Southern Pacific Railroads. The Inter-Cal then continued down through the Imperial Valley, connecting with the San Diego and Arizona Railway in El Centro. At Calexico, California, the Inter-Cal crossed the United States-Mexico border into Mexicali, Baja California. It then continued through the Mexicali Valley, before crossing the border again at Los Algodones, Baja California and finally terminating at Araz Junction in Andrade, California, where the line reconnected to the Sunset line.

== See also ==
- List of defunct railroads of North America
- Bibliography of California history
