= CG Railway =

US–Mexico rail-ferry service

- CG Railway, LLC
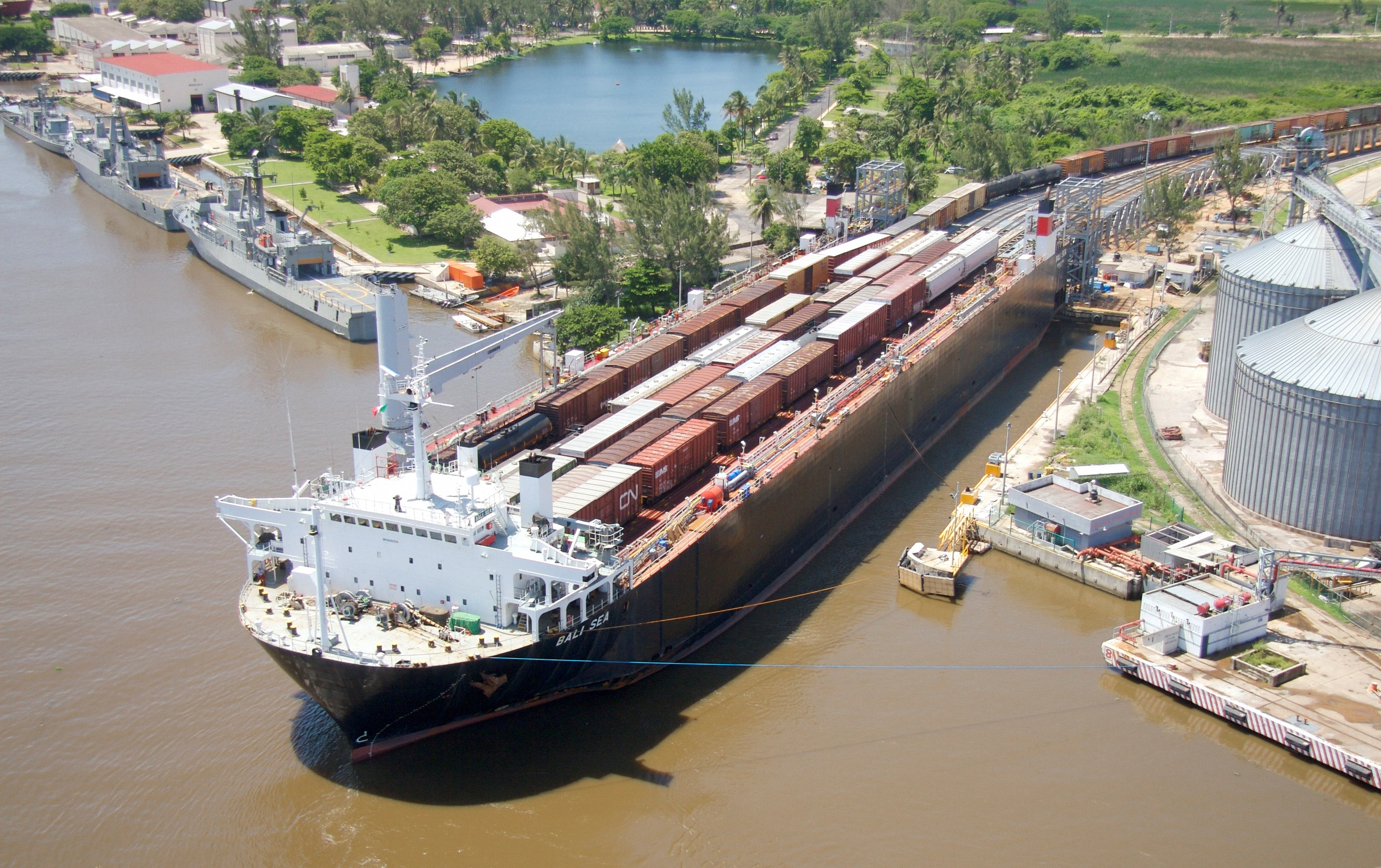
- MV Bali Sea (In service until 2021) loads up with Ferrosur trains in Coatzacoalcos. Note the two towers that allow vertical adjustment of the linkspan.

Overview
- Headquarters: Mobile, Alabama
- Reporting mark: CGR
- Locale: Mobile, Alabama, United States (30°43′24″N 88°02′40″W); Coatzacoalcos, Veracruz, Mexico (18°07′35″N 94°25′10″W)
- Dates of operation: 2000–present

Other
- Website: cgrailway.co

CG Railway (reporting mark CGR) is a switching and terminal railroad headquartered in Mobile, Alabama. It is jointly owned by SEACOR Holdings and Genesee & Wyoming.

The railroad operates a train ferry service between the Port of Mobile in Mobile, Alabama, and the Port of Coatzacoalcos in Coatzacoalcos, Veracruz, Mexico, a distance of approximately 956 miles (831 nmi; 1,539 km). The service began operations from Mobile in 2000 before relocating its United States terminal to New Orleans in 2004. Following heavy damage to the New Orleans terminal during Hurricane Katrina in 2005, operations later returned to Mobile.

CG Railway interchanges with CSX Transportation, Norfolk Southern Railway, BNSF Railway, Canadian National Railway, and the Alabama and Gulf Coast Railway in Mobile, and with Ferrocarril del Sureste in Coatzacoalcos.

== Operations ==
The railroad operates two double-deck rail ferries, the MV Cherokee and the MV Banda Sea, with service operating up to four times per week.

The Banda Sea was originally constructed with a single cargo deck and could initially carry railcars only on its main deck. In 2004, CG Railway contracted naval architecture firm Bennett & Associates to modify the vessel with the addition of a second rail deck, increasing its capacity to 115 railcars. The company also designed adjustable bilevel loading ramps at both terminals to permit loading on both decks.

Railcar loading and unloading in Mobile is handled by the Terminal Railway Alabama State Docks, while operations in Coatzacoalcos are handled by Ferrocarril del Sureste. CG Railway also operates two Trackmobile units at each port to assist with switching operations.

CG Railway transports approximately 10,000 railcars annually, including chemicals, plastics, refined sugar, steel, pulp, and paper products.

== See also ==
- Tren Interoceánico
- Isthmus of Tehuantepec
