= Southern Pacific Railroad of Mexico =

- Southern Pacific Company system in 1918

Overview
- Parent company: Southern Pacific Railroad
- Reporting mark: SPM
- Dates of operation: 1911–1951
- Predecessor: Sonora Railway
- Successor: Ferrocarril del Pacifico

Technical
- Track gauge: 1,435 mm (4 ft 8 1/2 in)
- Length: 1,095 miles (1,762 km)

The Southern Pacific Railroad of Mexico (reporting mark SPM) was a railroad subsidiary of the Southern Pacific Railroad in Mexico, operating from Nogales, Sonora, to Mazatlán, Sinaloa. The Sonora Railway was constructed by the Atchison, Topeka and Santa Fe Railway between 1879 and 1882, along with the connecting New Mexico and Arizona Railroad from Nogales, Arizona to Fairbank and Benson, Arizona. In 1898 the Santa Fe leased the line to the Southern Pacific in return for the latter railroad's line from Needles to Mojave, California. This arrangement continued until December 1911, when the Southern Pacific purchased both the Sonora Railway and the New Mexico and Arizona. The following June, the Sonora Railway became part of the Southern Pacific Railroad in Mexico.

The main line ran 1,095 miles from the Sonoran town of Nogales, just across the border from Arizona, to the city of Guadalajara, stopping at several northwestern cities and port towns along the way. Owned by the Southern Pacific Company, which operated a highly profitable railroad system north of the border, the SP de Mex transported millions of passengers as well as millions of tons of freight over the years, both within Mexico and across its northern border. Daniel Lewis (2007) reports it rarely turned a profit, and contends that SP executives, urged on by the media of the day, operated with a reflexive imperialism that kept the company committed to the railroad long after it ceased to make business sense.

It was sold to the Mexican government in 1951, becoming the Ferrocarril del Pacifico.

Southern Pacific abandoned the former New Mexico and Arizona Railroad section by 1960.

== Passenger operations ==
Until the mid-20th century it operated several local and mixed trains, in addition to the following long distance night train:

- El Costeno, #9 northbound, #10 southbound – Nogales – Guadalajara – Mexico City, D.F., with coordinated service with the Southern Pacific Railroad's Argonaut train to Los Angeles (#6 eastbound, #5 westbound).

The train was renamed as El Yaqui, #9 northbound, #10 southbound by 1949, with a bus replacing the section between Tucson and Nogales. When the SP of Mexico was absorbed into the Ferrocarril de Pacifico El Yaqui took the numbers #1 northbound, #2 southbound.

== See also ==
- List of Mexican railroads
