= Ferrocarril Sonora–Baja California =

The Ferrocarril Sonora–Baja California is a former railroad line of Mexico that built the line from Mexicali, Baja California, to Benjamín Hill, Sonora in 1948. It interchanged with the Southern Pacific Railroad at Calexico, California, and with the Ferrocarril del Pacifico in Benjamin Hill, Sonora. Before 1960, The SP-controlled Inter-California railroad provided trackage rights for the SBC from Pascualitos to the International Border. SBC took control of that part after the demise of the Inter-Cal.

SBC provided passenger and freight service throughout its existence. It was headquartered in Mexicali, B.C. and had major repair and overhaul shops for its equipment in the town of Benjamin Hill, Sonora. From 1970 into the FNM merger, the SBC also controlled the 44-mile freight-only "Ferrocarril Tijuana y Tecate" UB line from border to border. SP, Kyle Railways and later the San Diego and Imperial Valley Railroad operated the line, paying a fee to the SBC, and later to FNM.

It was absorbed into Nacionales de México in 1987, thus becoming a fallen-flag. The last passenger train from Mexicali to Benjamin Hill operated in 1997. Today the line continues to provide daily modern freight service, including intermodal. It is now known as Ferromex's Puerto Penasco Subdivision and designated by the SCT as the "U" and "UA" lines of the Mexican rail system.

== S-BC F Unit Roster ==
Model	S-BC #	Former #	Built	Serial #, Order #	Notes
FTA	2203A	NP 6010D, then NP 5410D	EMD 01-1945	2840, E636A	NP trade-in to GE for U25C, 9/1/1964; to SBC from GE; to Museo Nacional de los Ferrocarriles Mexicanos in 1998
FTB	2203B	NP 6006C, then NP 5406C	EMD 10-1944	2572, E612_b	NP trade-in to GE for U25C, 9/1/1964; to SBC from GE; at Benjamin Hill (2009)
F7A	2201	S.C.O.P. 23037	EMD 09-1949	9886, E1296-A	to Museo de los Ferrocarriles de Yucatan; under restoration
F7A	2202	S.C.O.P. 23038	EMD 09-1949	9887, E1296-A	at Benjamín Hill rail yard, to be dismantled.
FP7A	2101	S.C.O.P. 23035	EMD 09-1949	9888, E1313-A	at Benjamín Hill rail yard to be dismantled.
FP7A	2102	S.C.O.P. 23036	EMD 09-1949	9889, E1313-A	at Benjamín Hill rail yard to be dismantled.

== See also ==
- List of Mexican railroads
- Ferrocarriles Nacionales de Mexico
- Ferromex
