= ISBA High School Mock Trial Invitational =

The Illinois State Bar Association High School Mock Trial Invitational is a high school mock trial tournament that has been held every year since 1983. The event is administered by the Illinois State Bar Association. The winning team represents the state of Illinois at the National High School Mock Trial Championship. Originally held in Springfield, Illinois, the invitational moved to

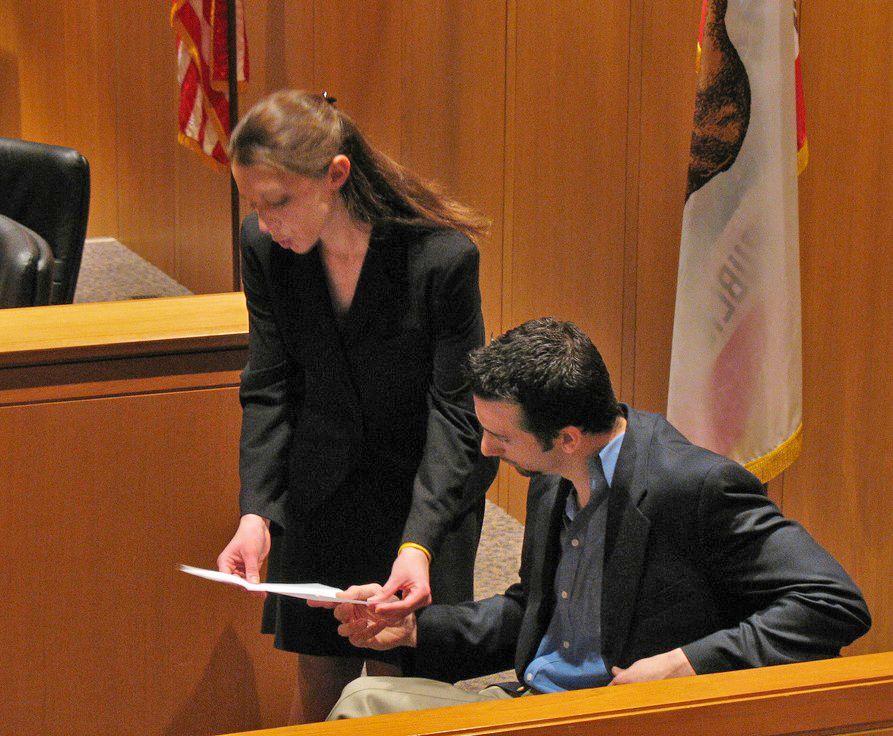
Mock trials allow researchers to examine confirmation biases in a realistic setting.

Champaign, Illinois in 2013, before moving back to Springfield for the 2019 and subsequent competitions.

== Format ==
Each school must submit a roster of no more than ten members. The tournament consists of two preliminary rounds, with each school having a chance to represent both the plaintiff/prosecution and defense. After the first two rounds, the 8 (10, beginning in 2025) highest scoring teams advance to a final round. The team with the highest point total following the final round wins the competition. At the end of the competition, several students are awarded outstanding attorney and outstanding witness awards, and the top three placing teams are announced. ISBA also releases the top 20 teams after the tournament.

== Past Champions ==
The following is a list of invitational champions:

- 2026: Normal Community West High School
- 2025: College Preparatory School of America (CPSA)
- 2024: College Preparatory School of America (CPSA)
- 2023: Maine South High School
- 2022: Timothy Christian School
- 2021: Evanston Township High School.
- 2020: No contest held. Covid Pandemic Shutdown.
- 2019: York Community High School
- 2018: St. Charles North High School
- 2017: St. Charles North High School
- 2016: Timothy Christian School (Illinois)
- 2015: Hinsdale Central High School
- 2014: St. Charles North High School.
- 2013: Hinsdale Central High School
- 2012: Hinsdale Central High School
- 2011: Glenwood High School (Illinois)
- 2010: Hinsdale Central High School
- 2009: Hinsdale Central High School
- 2008: Highland Park High School (Highland Park, Illinois)
- 2007: Glenbard East High School
- 2006: Timothy Christian School (Illinois)
- 2005: Hinsdale Central High School
- 2004: Timothy Christian School (Illinois)
- 2003: Timothy Christian School (Illinois)
- 2002: Timothy Christian School (Illinois)
- 2001: Boylan Catholic High School
- 2000: Timothy Christian School (Illinois)
- 1999: Boylan Catholic High School
- 1998: Timothy Christian School (Illinois)
- 1997: Glenbard South High School
- 1996: Hinsdale Central High School
- 1995: Mt. Vernon Township High School (Illinois)
- 1994: Hinsdale Central High School
- 1993: Glenbard South High School
- 1992: Glenbard South High School
- 1991: Hinsdale Central High School
- 1990: Hinsdale Central High School
- 1989: St. Charles East High School
- 1988: Hinsdale Central High School
- 1987: Marian Central Catholic High School
- 1986: Glenbard South High School
- 1985: Glenbard South High School
- 1983–84: No winners announced.

== Results By School ==
The following schools have placed in the top 3 at least once:

School	1st place Finishes	2nd place Finishes	3rd place Finishes	Total
Hinsdale Central High School	11	7	4	22
Timothy Christian School (Illinois)	7	8	4	19
Glenbard South High School	5	6	4	15
Boylan Catholic High School	2	2	5	9
St. Charles North High School	3	3	1	7
York Community High School	1	2	2	5
College Preparatory School of America (Lombard, Illinois)	2	1	1	4
St. Charles East High School	1	1	2	4
Glenbard East High School	1	2	1	4
Evanston Township High School	1	1	1	3
Normal Community West High School	1	1	1	3
Maine South High School	1	0	1	2
Glenwood High School (Illinois)	1	1	0	2
Highland Park High School (Highland Park, Illinois)	1	0	0	1
Evanston Township High School	1	1	0	2
Marian Central Catholic High School	1	0	0	1
Mt. Vernon Township High School (Illinois)	1	0	0	1
Chicago Christian High School	0	0	4	4
Oak Park and River Forest High School	0	1	2	3
Niles West High School	0	1	1	2
Kenwood Academy	0	1	1	2
Adlai Stevenson High School	0	1	1	2
Niles West High School	0	1	1	2
Freeport High School (Illinois)	0	1	0	1
Hirsch Metropolitan High School	0	1	0	1
Mundelein High School	0	1	0	1
Wells High School	0	1	0	1
Larkin High School	0	0	3	3
Lincoln Park High School (Chicago)	0	0	1	1

State Finalists each year (only top 3 in order):

2026 State Finalists	2025 State Finalists (moved to top 10)	2024 State Finalists	2023 State Finalists	2022 State Finalists	2021 State Finalists	2019 State Finalists
Normal Community West High School	College Preparatory School of America (CPSA)	College Preparatory School of America (CPSA)	Maine South High School	Timothy Christian High School	Evanston Township High School	York Community High School
Timothy Christian High School	Timothy Christian High School	Adlai Stevenson High School	Normal Community West High School	Niles West High School	College Preparatory School of America (CPSA)	Glenbard East High School
Niles West High School	Normal Community West High School	Maine South High School	College Preparatory School of America (CPSA)	Adlai Stevenson High School	Timothy Christian High School	Evanston Township High School
Muslim Community Center Academy (MCC)		De La Salle Institute	De La Salle Institute	Bartlett High School		
Bartlett High School		Niles North High School	Hinsdale Central High School	Evanston High School		
Wheeling High School		Wheeling High School	St. Charles North High School	Highland Park High School		
Hinsdale Central High School		Whitney M. Young Magnet High School	Whitney M. Young Magnet High School	Naperville North High School		
St. Charles East High School			York High School	Whitney M. Young Magnet High School		
Adlai Stevenson High School		N/A	N/A	N/A	N/A	N/A
College Preparatory School of America (CPSA)		N/A	N/A	N/A	N/A	N/A

== National Championship ==
The winner of the ISBA High School Mock Trial Invitational has represented the state at the National High School Mock Trial Championship since its inaugural tournament in 1984. No Illinois team has ever won the tournament, although Hinsdale Central High School finished in 2nd place in 2010. Most recently, Illinois finished 16th at the 2026 National Championship in Des Moines, Iowa.

2026: 16th place in Des Moines, Iowa. Top 10 Outstanding Witness Jordan Stovall.

2025: 13th place in Phoenix, Arizona. Top 10 Outstanding Attorney Samiha Amjad.

2024: 13th place in Wilmington, Delaware. Top 10 Outstanding Witness Ahmed Iqbal.

2023: 17th place in Little Rock, Arkansas. Top 10 Outstanding Witness

2022: 19th place in Kalamazoo, Michigan (Online).

2021: 8th place in Evansville, Indiana (Online).

2019: 13th place in Athens, Georgia.

2018: 27th place in Reno, Nevada.

2017: 34th place in Hartford, Connecticut. Top 10 Outstanding Attorney Ryan Wolak.

2016: 26th place in Boise, Idaho.

2015: 19th place in Raleigh, North Carolina. Top 10 Outstanding Attorney Award James Walker & Top 10 Outstanding Witness Award Katherine Rodgers.

2014: 10th place in Madison, Wisconsin.

2013: 5th place in Indianapolis, Indiana.

2012: 9th place in Albuquerque, New Mexico.

2011: 12th place in Phoenix, Arizona.

2010: 2nd place in Philadelphia, Pennsylvania. Carl Oxholm III Award Vinay Nayak.
