= Baker Hotel =

Baker Hotel may refer to:

- Hotel Baker, St. Charles, Illinois
- Baker Hotel (Baker, Montana) in Fallon County
- Baker Hotel (Mineral Wells, Texas) in Palo Pinto County
- Baker Hotel (Baker City, Oregon), (originally Baker Community Hotel)
- Baker Hotel (Dallas), demolished in 1980 to make way for One Bell Plaza
