= Pottawatomie Park =

Public park in St. Charles, Illinois

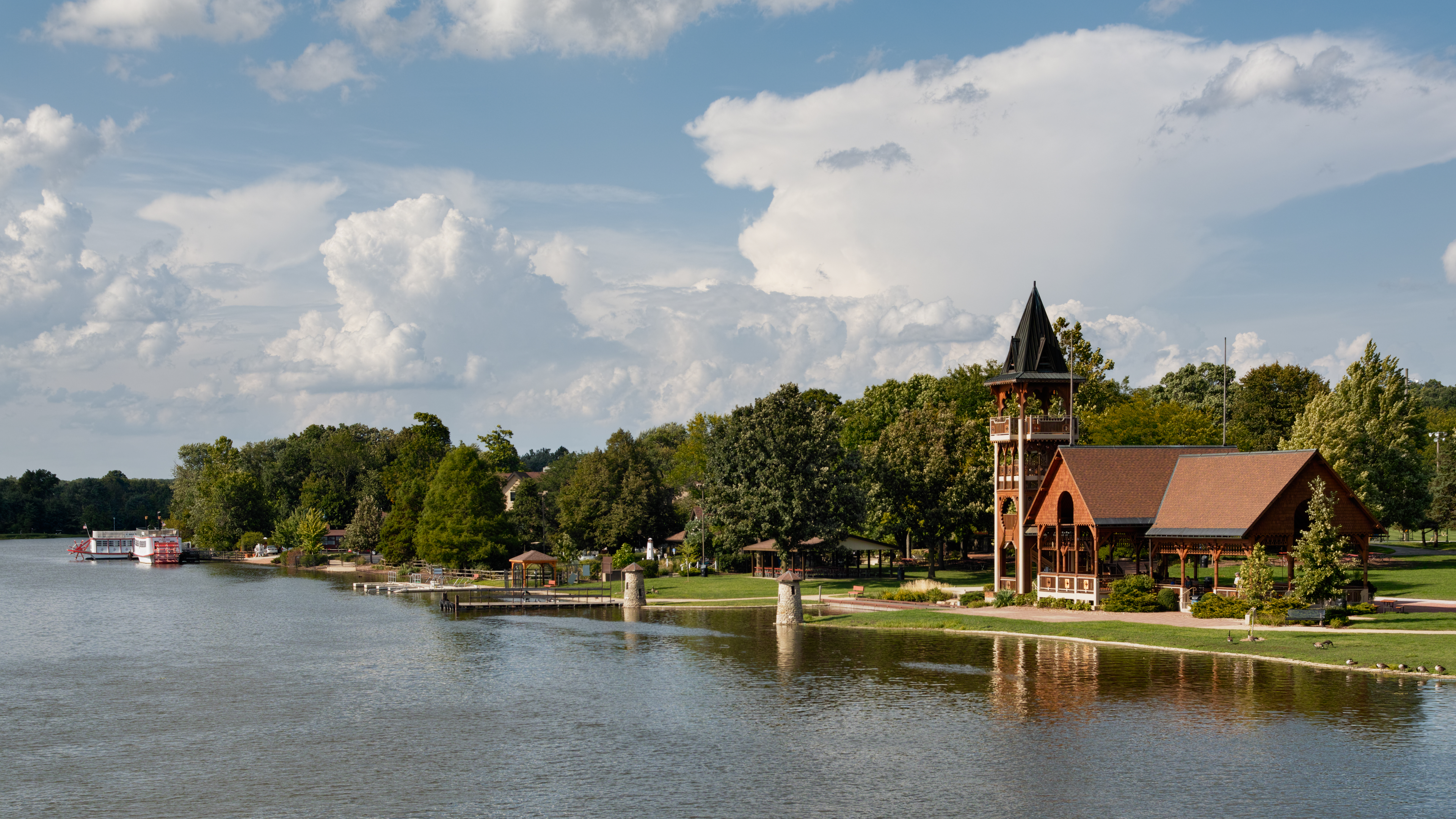
- Interactive map of Pottawatomie Park
- Type: Urban park
- Location: St. Charles, Illinois
- Coordinates: 41°55′23″N 88°18′58″W
- Area: 38.3 acres (15.5 ha)
- Elevation: 702 feet (214 m)
- Operator: St. Charles Park District
- Website: Official website

Pottawatomie Park is a historic public park in St. Charles, Illinois, along the eastern bank of the Fox River. Purchased in 1912 by the fledgling local park district, it became the first public park established under the Illinois Park Act of 1911.

== History ==
Traditionally used by the Meskwaki and Potawatomi people (the latter of whom lend their name to the park), the land was purchased at the town's 1834 incorporation by local settler Calvin Ward. Ward's son Lorenzo built an outdoor pavilion and a mansion on the site, in line with the many cottages that had been built along the river in the latter portion of the nineteenth century. After Ward's mansion burned down, the Chicago Great Western Railway acquired and built a line through the land in 1905. The park district purchased the underlying land from the railroad in 1912, to prevent commercial development of the property.

A grant in the 1920s from both the Works Progress Administration and philanthropist Edward J. Baker facilitated construction of several facilities in the park, including tennis courts, two swimming pools, and a nine-hole golf course.

In 2010, the Union Pacific Railroad, successor to the Chicago and Great Western, successfully petitioned the Surface Transportation Board to abandon its line through the park. As the St. Charles section of the railroad constitutes a gap between two discontinuous sections of the Great Western Trail, the park district and railroad are negotiating a conversion of the railroad to a recreational trail.

== Features ==
Today, the park has a mini-golf course, watercraft rentals, and the original two swimming pools and nine-hole golf course from the early twentieth century. The park is also located along the Fox River Trail, allowing pedestrian and bicycle access to other towns along the river.

In 2000, the park district built a recreation of Lorenzo Ward's 1892 outdoor pavilion, which had fallen down in the years prior.

Two riverboats, St. Charles Belle II and Fox River Queen, ferry passengers on pleasure cruises on the Fox River. Laid down in the 1980s, they replaced the earlier Honeymoon Queen, which had served the area since 1945.

=== Golf course ===
Pottawatomie Golf Course
- Interactive map of Pottawatomie Golf Course

Club information
- Established: 1939
- Type: Public
- Tota holes: 9
- Greens: Bent Grass
- Fairways: Bluegrass
- Website: https://www.pottawatomiegc.com/

Pottawatomie Golf Course
- Designed by: Robert Trent Jones
- Par: 35
- Length: 3,007 yards (2,750 m)
- Course rating: 35.0
- Slope rating: 122

Designed by architect Robert Trent Jones, the nine-hole golf course features primarily wide fairways alongside the Fox River. When park board chairman Lester Norris and his wife Dellora A. Norris commissioned Jones to design a riverside course, Jones used the opportunity to experiment with water hazards, designing his first island green at the third hole. After the success of Pottawatomie he would later go on to be known for designing hazards, of which he later wrote in a 1989 retrospective "I've found that water holes, because of their beauty and challenge, are the most popular among the majority of golfers. They get excited about water. It is a hazard that is immediately recognizable, and it appeals to them, even if in a perverse way. They are intimidated by it, but they are fascinated by it." The course opened in July 1939 at a fee of 15 cents per round, which was much lower than its contemporaneous public courses.

Today, the course serves players of all skill levels. The course regularly serves leagues, tournaments, and lessons and hosted 36,000 rounds in 2021. Improvements to the original design have included the addition of an irrigation system, new cart paths, and ADA compliance.
