= Arcadia Theater =

Arcadia Theater or Arcadia Theatre may refer to:

in Russia

- Arcadia Theater (Russia), a theater company

in the United States

- Arcadia Theatre (Olney, Illinois), 1927, closed in 2016
- Arcadia Theater, in Windber, Pennsylvania
- Arcadia Theater (Wellsboro, Pennsylvania), NRHP-listed in the Wellsboro Historic District
- Arcadia Theater (Kerrville, Texas) (has commons pics)
- Arcadia Theater (Floresville, Texas) (has commons pics)

in the United Kingdom

- Arcadia Theatre, incorporated into the Futurist Theatre, (Scarborough, North Yorkshire), closed in 2019

== See also ==
- Arcada Theater, in Illinois
