= Patrick Brown (American football) =

American football player (born 1986)

No. 79
- Position: Offensive tackle

Personal information
- Born: December 25, 1986 (age 39); Naperville, Illinois, U.S.
- Listed height: 6 ft 5 in (1.96 m)
- Listed weight: 310 lb (141 kg)

Career information
- High school: St. Charles North (St. Charles, Illinois)
- College: UCF
- NFL draft: 2009: undrafted

Career history
- Carolina Panthers (2009)*; New England Patriots (2009)*; Minnesota Vikings (2009–2010)*; New York Jets (2010); Miami Dolphins (2010); Minnesota Vikings (2010–2011); Miami Dolphins (2012); Carolina Panthers (2013)*
- * Offseason or practice squad member only

Awards and highlights
- Conference USA All-Freshman (2005); First-team All-Conference USA (2007); Second-team All-Conference USA (2008)

Career NFL statistics
- Games played: 16
- Stats at Pro Football Reference

Patrick Brown (born December 25, 1986) is an American former professional football player who was an offensive tackle in the National Football League (NFL). He was signed as an undrafted free agent by the Carolina Panthers in 2009. He played college football for the UCF Knights.

He was also a member of the New England Patriots, Minnesota Vikings, Miami Dolphins and New York Jets.

== Early life ==
Brown attended St. Charles North High School in St. Charles, Illinois, where he played football and track and field. He was a two-time all-conference and all-area selection.

== College career ==
After graduating high school, Brown attended the University of Central Florida beginning in 2005. As a true freshman, he started all 12 games he played in, leading the nation's freshman in that category. As a sophomore, he started 12 games again, earning honorable mention All-Conference USA honors. He started all 14 games in 2007, earning him first-team all-Conference USA honors. He started another 12 games in 2008, ending his national-best 50-game starting streak. He was again named as a first-team All-Conference USA selection.

== Professional career ==
=== Carolina Panthers ===
Brown was signed by the Carolina Panthers after going undrafted in the 2009 NFL draft. He was waived by the Panthers on September 5 during final cuts.

=== New England Patriots ===
Brown was signed to the practice squad of the New England Patriots on September 6, 2009. He was released on September 24.

=== Minnesota Vikings ===
Brown was signed to the practice squad of the Minnesota Vikings on September 29, 2009, after center Jon Cooper was promoted to the active roster.

=== New York Jets ===
The Jets claimed Brown off waivers on September 5, 2010. Brown was later waived by the team on September 23, 2010.

=== Miami Dolphins ===
Two days before facing divisional rival, the New York Jets, the Dolphins would claim Brown off waivers on September 24, 2010.

Brown was waived by the Dolphins on November 9, 2010.

=== Minnesota Vikings (second stint) ===
After passing through waivers Brown was signed back to the Vikings practice squad. After a season-ending injury to offensive guard Anthony Herrera, Brown was activated to the 53-man Active list on November 24.
