= Hotel Baker =

Historic building in St. Charles, Illinois, US

- U.S. National Register of Historic Places
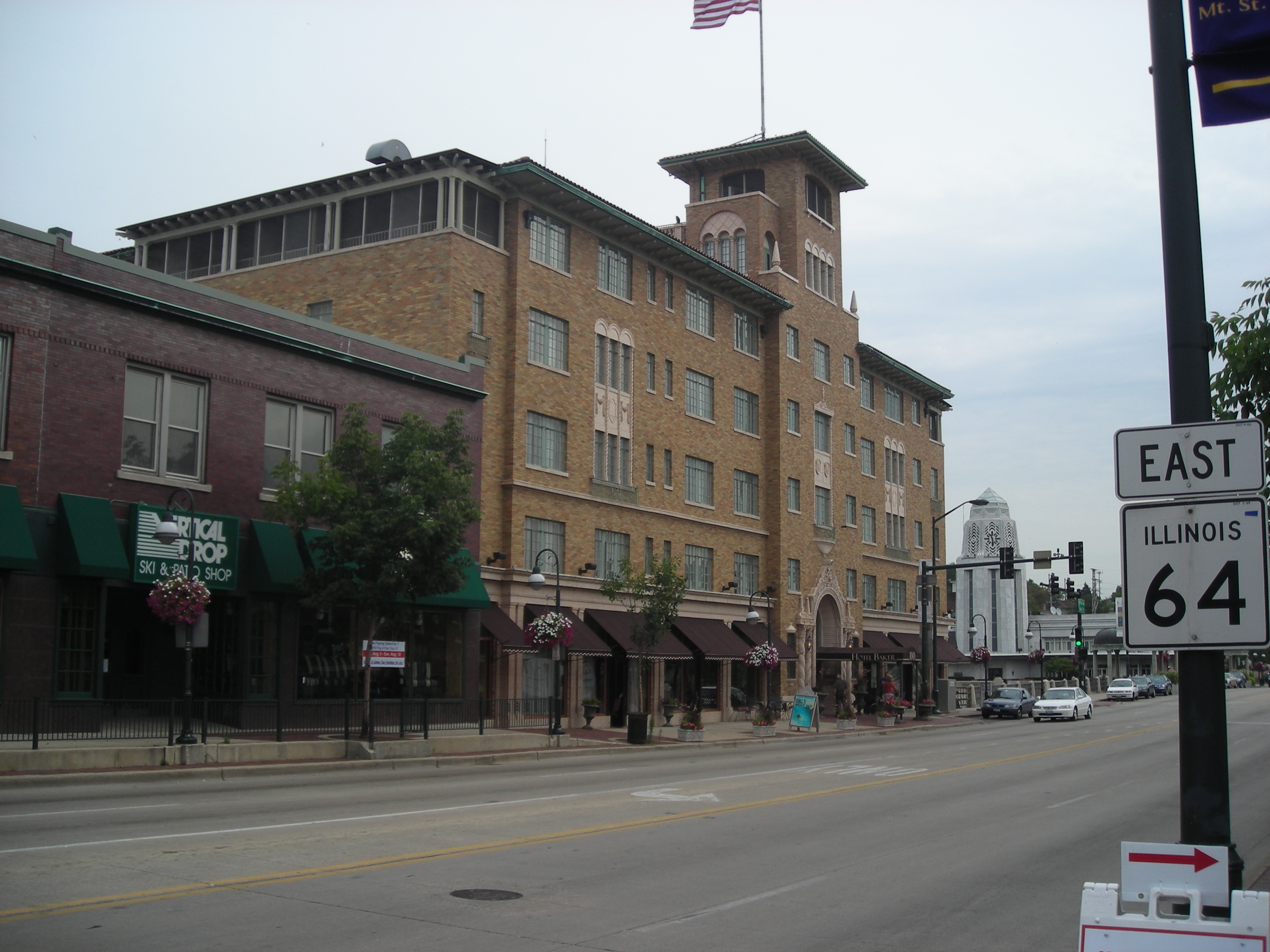

- Location within Illinois Location within the United States
- Location: 100 W. Main Street, St. Charles, Illinois
- Coordinates: 41°54′49″N 88°18′54″W
- Area: less than one acre
- Built: 1928 (opened June 2)
- Built by: Max A. Lehmann and Sons
- Architect: Wolf, Sexton, Harper & Trueax, Inc.
- Architectural style: Spanish Revival
- NRHP reference No.: 78001157
- Added to NRHP: December 8, 1978

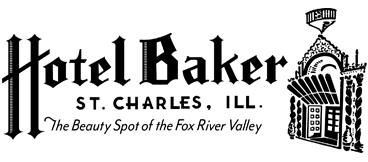

Hotel Baker is a historic landmark in St. Charles, Illinois, listed on the National Register of Historic Places and has been in and out of the hotel business since 1928.

== History ==
It was 1926 when the groundbreaking began at a site of a garbage dump at the Main Street bridge. Col. Edward J. Baker envisioned a luxury hotel, a resort and escape for the community of St. Charles, and an icon to the world for what big things were happening there.

The Hotel Baker was Col. Baker's home. Col. Baker was a farmer. He and his niece Dellora Norris inherited the fortune of the founder of Texaco Oil, Col. Baker's brother-in-law John Gates. Col. Baker and his niece Dellora invested the money in the town. With every gift they gave, they gave with quiet graciousness. Col. Baker gave in abundance and ran the Hotel Baker at a yearly deficit. He was friends with people from all walks of life and wanted people to enjoy beauty and luxury no matter where they came from. When he decided to build the Hotel Baker, he told the architects to build their masterpiece. He lost his son and then his wife, and instead of living alone in the house, he moved into the hotel, where he was always there to welcome people.

The Hotel Baker was built on the site of the old Haines Mill, which had been destroyed by fire in 1918 and was then used as a dumping grounds for seven years. Col. Baker believed that a garbage dump should not be the focal point of his hometown, so he bought the land and construction commenced on what was to be "the World's finest small hotel." The Hotel cost a rounded sum of $1,250,000 to build. The Hotel Baker was built with its own operating hydroelectric facility, the first-ever lighted dance floor of its kind, and there was a radio station established from the hotel's tower (which now exists as the "Penthouse Suite"). The Hotel Baker Gardens originally extended further than they do today, featuring a fishing pond and nine-hole miniature golf course.

The hotel had its own parking garage. Designed to be as elaborate as the hotel, the Hotel Baker Garage opened in 1930 with a Hudson dealership, complete service garage, wash bay, Texaco gas station, and parking on the second floor for all of the hotel's guests. The parking garage was demolished in 1983 to make way for the assisted living facility Carroll Tower.

The hotel opened to the public on June 2, 1928, hosting a dinner for 301. Rooms cost $2.50 a night. Each room was decorated in its own unique style, so that no two rooms were alike.

Col. Baker considered himself "first and foremost a farmer" and owned nine farms in the Fox Valley area, from which food was provided to the Hotel Baker for guaranteed freshness in its kitchens.

The Rainbow Room, the most famous feature of the hotel, was originally the hotel's restaurant and ballroom. Such performers as Louis Armstrong, Lawrence Welk, Tommy Dorsey, Guy Lombardo, and Eddie Duchin performed at the Hotel Baker atop its 63,000 wattage dance floor of patterned red, green, blue, and amber lights numbering 2,620. The floor originally could display patterns such as stars, an American flag, Christmas tree, or Valentine's Day heart. At night, the dam outside was also lighted in the flashing colors of the rainbow. A pipe organ with two consoles (one in the Rainbow Room and one in the Trophy Room) was played by the hotel's organist Mrs. Mary Bayliss for people to enjoy.

The radio studio in the top tower of the Hotel broadcast music played in the Rainbow Room, and — through a special connection (a wire running along the Main Street Bridge) — the Municipal Building was a "singing tower" and played the music from the Rainbow Room across the valley from loudspeakers installed in the top of the tower.

As Col. Baker came to find hobbies to occupy his interest and newfound wealth, he began to harbor a great interest in horse racing, building up Hotel Baker Stables with the leading record of wins of a harness horse stable. He purchased his prized trotter Greyhound as a yearling in 1933. Greyhound went on to win 25 international records during his racing career. Col. Baker received his title as a Kentucky Colonel in 1935, honored as part of the Commonwealth of Kentucky by Governor Ruby Laffoon—in recognition of his contributions to his home town and pursuit in raising horses.

The hotel's lounge became known as the Trophy Room, for Baker put his vast number of racing trophies on display here as his trotters brought him more acclaim.

Col. Baker ran the Hotel Baker at a yearly deficit. For its first 31 years in business, the Hotel Baker never had to turn a profit. As long as Col. Baker was there, he continued to run the Hotel providing the funding for all its luxuries at the inexpensive price he sold.

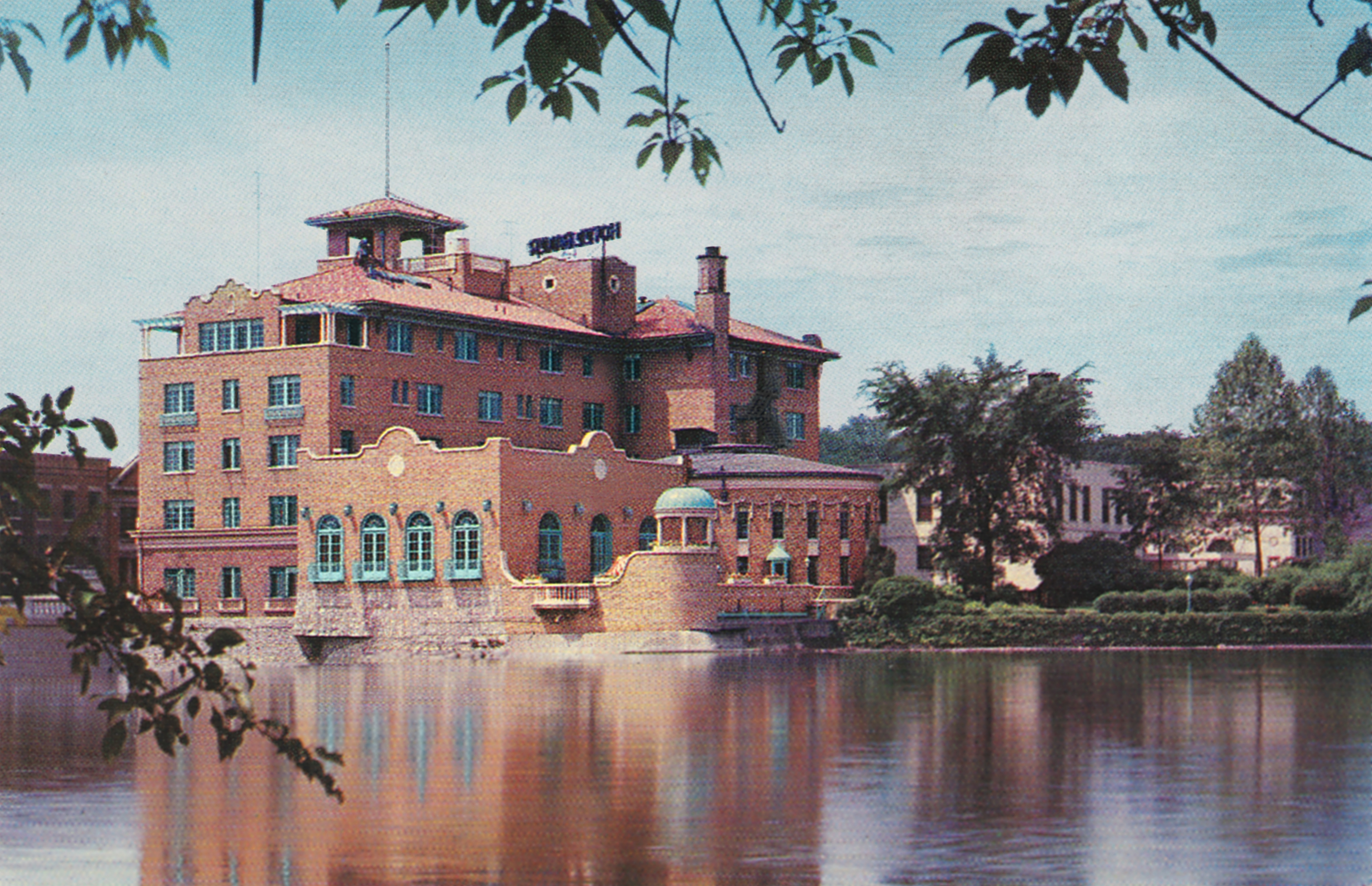
The Hotel Baker during its heyday

Col. Baker died in 1959. In his will, he specified gifts to be given to his friends, but the remainder of his estate was left to his niece Dellora Norris.

Dellora Norris operated the hotel until 1970, when she donated the building to the ownership of the Lutheran Social Services of Illinois. Faced with aging and health issues, Mrs. Norris looked to find a suitable buyer because no one in the family showed an interest in the building. By that time the hotel had lost its appeal. Compared to the newly opened Pheasant Run Resort east of town, the Hotel Baker was outdated. The hotel was converted to be an assisted living facility "for the well-heeled elderly." Its public spaces remained open, and the Hotel began to adopt its status as a banquet space rather than the "weekend getaway" it was.

Over the years, the Hotel fell into disrepair. The retirement home, overwhelmed with the cost of upkeep, began selling artwork and furniture from the Hotel before eventually selling the hotel in a sealed bid auction.

In 1996 two local St. Charles businessmen, Craig Frank and Neil Johnson, purchased the hotel and began a renovation costing a rounded sum of $9,000,000. Hoping to re-establish the tired and worn retirement home back as Hotel Baker, Frank and Johnson spent two years cleaning, furnishing, and upgrading the utilities of the long-neglected property. Many of the original pieces of furniture were returned to the building. Craig Frank had just finished restoring the Arcada Theatre with Willis Johnson of Classic Cinemas, and Mr. Frank thought how neat it would be to have the Hotel and the Arcada back how they used to be. After the restoration and running the hotel at a loss the first couple of years, the cost became prohibitive despite the first year ever in the hotel's history of making a profit.

The hotel was sold in a bank auction in 2003 for a rounded sum of $3,000,000. After visiting the hotel in 2001, Rowena and Joe Salas bought the hotel when it was in foreclosure in 2003. What originally was intended to be a quick investment turned into an adventure for the couple as they invested in constantly updating the hotel and keeping it going. The Hotel Baker continues to be the scene of many community and family functions—the center of life in the St. Charles Community.

== Awards ==
The Hotel Baker is listed on the National Record of Historic Places. It also helped earn St. Charles the title of "1 Great Place in Illinois" and the Great American Main Street Award in 2000.
