= St. Charles History Museum =

Coordinates: 41.9139022°N 88.3113265°W

- Established: 1933
- Location: 215 East Main Street, St. Charles, Illinois, USA
- Website: St. Charles History Museum

The St. Charles History Museum is located at 215 East Main Street in St. Charles, Illinois, United States. Originating from the St. Charles Historical Society, founded in 1933, Col. E. J. Baker established a space dedicated to a historical museum in the St. Charles Municipal Building which opened in 1940. Col. Baker donated the Municipal Building to St. Charles with a condition that the city must always provide a space for a historical museum. The museum was located in the St. Charles Municipal Building until 2001, when it was then moved to the 1928 McCornack Oil Company building after renovations in May 2001. The main collections hold over 10,000 photographs and 15,000 artifacts, mainly focused on local history.
