= Dellora A. Norris =

American philanthropist (1902–1979)

Dellora Angell Norris
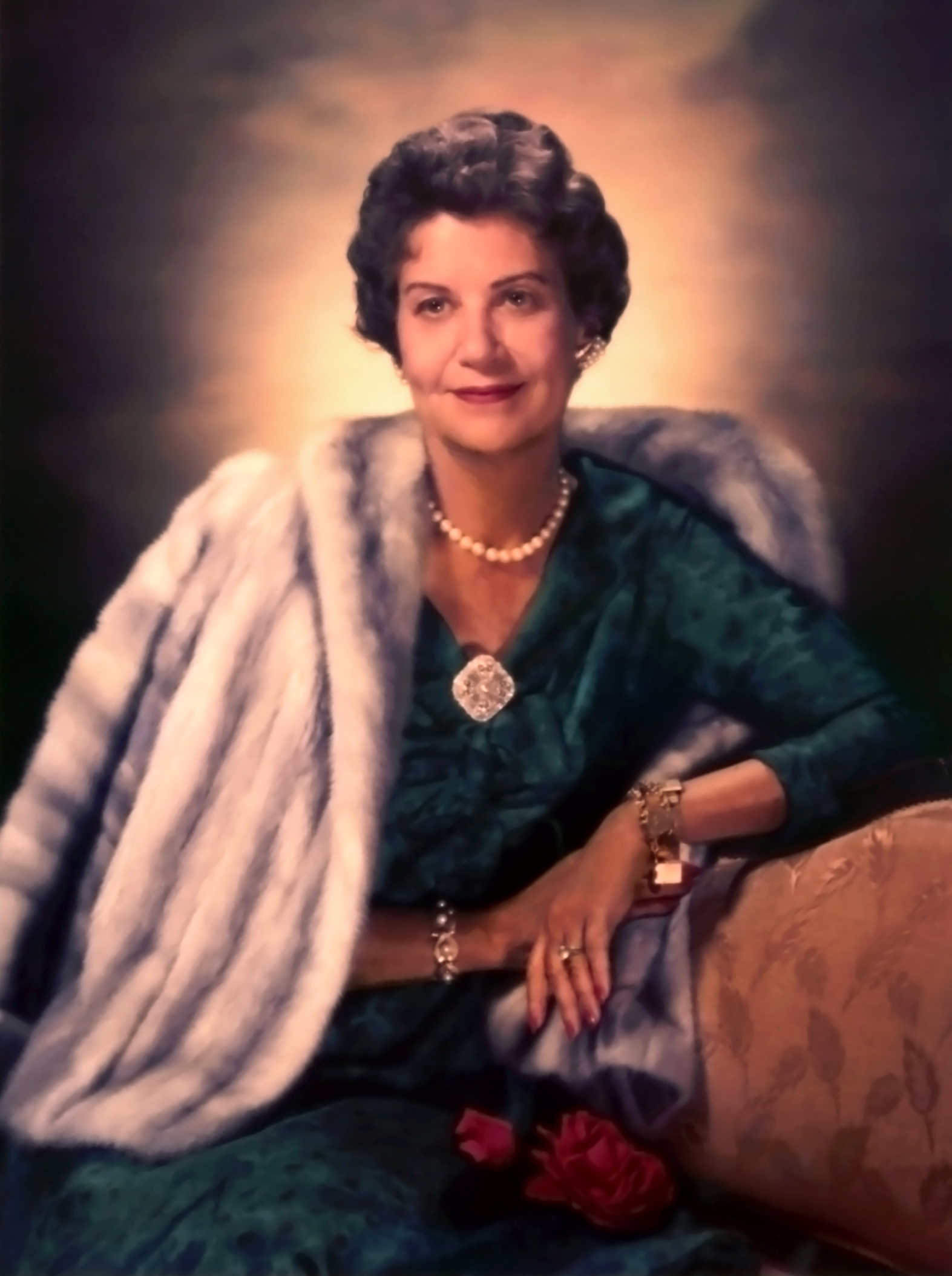
- Born: 23 December 1902; St. Charles, Illinois
- Died: 28 December 1979 (aged 77)
- Occupation: Philanthropist
- Spouse: Lester J. Norris (m. 1923)
- Children: 5

Dellora Frances Angell Norris (December 23, 1902 – December 28, 1979) was an American philanthropist and heir to the Texaco fortune. She gave generously to the communities of her hometown St. Charles, Illinois, and vacation home Naples, Florida.

== Inheritance ==
As one of two remaining heirs, Norris, inherited the estate of John Warne Gates, husband of her mother's sister, Dellora Baker (Gates). Upon Gates's death in 1911, his fortune was left to his widow, Dellora, and son, Charlie. Charlie Gates died in 1913; Dellora Baker Gates died in 1918 willing her fortune to her brother, Col. E. J. Baker and niece Dellora (Norris). Norris and her uncle Col. Baker both became generous benefactors to St. Charles where many buildings and landmarks were built from their contributions; such as the Hotel Baker, Arcada Theatre, and St. Charles Municipal Building.

== Philanthropy ==
Norris married graphic artist and Chicago Tribune cartoonist Lester J. Norris in 1923. They formed St. Charles Charities (now the Dellora A. and Lester J. Norris Foundation) in 1924 and funded multiple civic improvements throughout their lives including; the St. Charles Country Club, Arcada Theatre, Delnor Hospital, St. Charles East High School, the Dellora A. Norris Cultural Arts Center, and the John B. Norris Recreation Center. A statue of Norris's likeness was placed in the plaza in front of the St. Charles Municipal Building to honor her contributions to St. Charles.

Lester and Dellora Norris purchased The Keewaydin Club in Naples, Florida, which was their vacation home. The Norrises donated generously to the Naples community, providing the funding to rebuild the Naples Pier after Hurricane Donna in 1960 and again in 1970 when the pilings had to be replaced. The Norrises fought to ensure the pier would remain open free of charge. The Norris Family Foundation gave the initial contribution and spearheaded the rebuilding of the pier after Hurricane Ian in 2022. In 1964, they donated the land for Delnor-Wiggins Pass State Park. As an aside, the name "Delnor" comes from the first three letters of Dellora Norris's first and last name.

== Life in St. Charles ==
Norris had five children: Lavern (Gaynor), Lester Jr., Joann (Collins), Robert, and John. Although primarily a homemaker, Norris had an early interest in nursing as a career. She chaired the Nursing Aide Corp. in St. Charles, a group of women in the 1940s who assumed nursing duties at Delnor Hospital during World War II. An American Red Cross report for the Fox River Chapter showed 59 nurse’s aides assigned to Delnor Hospital in August, 1945.

== Volunteerism ==
Norris participated in many civic clubs in St. Charles during her lifetime. She was a charter member of the St. Charles Mother’s Club, and a member and former president of the St. Charles Pottawatomie Garden Club, as well as a member of the Baker Memorial United Methodist Church of St. Charles, the St. Charles Chamber of Commerce, and the St. Charles Women’s Club. Norris was a lifetime trustee of Delnor Hospital and the Henry Rockwell Baker Memorial Community Center.

Norris was also a governing life member and benefactor of the Art Institute of Chicago and the Chicago Historical Society. She had been a director and benefactor of the Miami Heart Institute of Miami Beach, Florida, the Illinois Education Association and the American Museum of Natural History in New York City.

== Related Bibliography ==
- Gaynor, Lavern Norris. Lal: a Legacy of Gracious Giving. 2008. Memoir Shoppe, Hodge University.
- Pearson, Ruth Seen. Reflections of St. Charles; an Abridged History. 1976, 2019. St. Charles History Museum. ISBN 9781706981459
- Spirou, Costas. St. Charles: Culture and Leisure in an All-American Town. 2005. Arcadia Publishing. ISBN 0738534064
- Szymczak, Patricia M. (January 15, 1989). "The Legacy". Chicago Tribune.
- Wendt, Lloyd; Kogan, Herman (1948). Bet a million! The story of John W. Gates. Bobbs-Merrill. hdl:2027/mdp.39015002974452.
