= Timothy Christian School (Illinois) =

Christian school in lIllinois, United States

Coordinates: 41°51′56.7″N 87°56′31.1″W

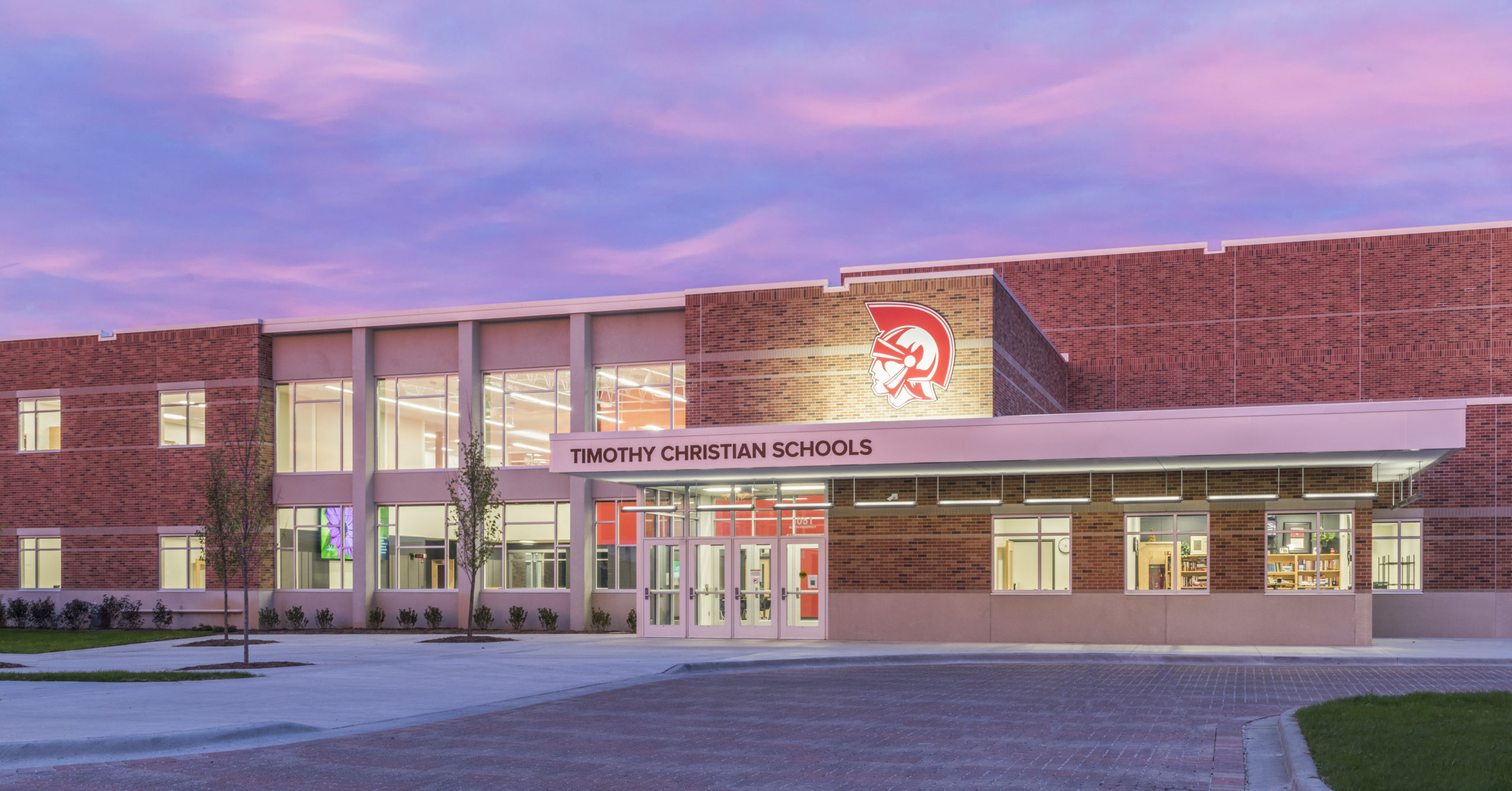
- Elmhurst, Illinois; United States

Information
- Type: Pre–12
- Motto: Go Beyond
- Religious affiliation: Nondenominational Christian School
- Established: 1911
- Faculty: 91
- Enrollment: 1267
- Campus type: Suburban
- Colors: Red and White
- Athletics conference: Chicagoland Christian Conference
- Mascot: Trojans
- Website: Timothy Christian Schools

Timothy Christian Schools is a private nondenominational Christian school in Elmhurst, Illinois, founded in 1911.

== Academics ==
The school is recognized by the state of Illinois and the DuPage County Education Service Region. Timothy Christian Schools is fully accredited by the North Central Association through Cognia and is recognized by the Illinois State Board of Education. Timothy Christian Schools is also a member of the Council on Educational Standards and Accountability. In September 2019, Timothy Christian High School was awarded a National Blue Ribbon from the US Department of Education. The elementary school was recently only one of 6 in the state to win the “Whole Child Award” from the Illinois Association for Supervision and Curriculum Development.

== Facilities ==
Timothy Christian Schools has undergone $50 million in renovations, including a $16 million middle school and athletic arena. Project highlights include new classrooms, science lab, lobby/cafeteria, and new athletic arena for the high school. The elementary school recently underwent a renovation along with furniture and technology upgrades in the high school.

== Athletics ==
Timothy Christian Schools is a member of the Illinois High School Association. There are ten sports available for boys: baseball, basketball, cross country, golf, gymnastics, soccer, swimming, track and field, and volleyball. There are twelve sports available for girls: badminton, basketball, cross country, competitive cheerleading, competitive dance, golf, softball, soccer, swimming, tennis, track and field and volleyball. Trojan Stadium was opened in 2022, which is a sports complex that includes an artificial turf soccer field, lighting, sound, press box, tennis courts, an 8-lane track, and seats for nearly 1,000 fans.

== Activities ==
Other extracurricular activities on campus include over 24 clubs and opportunities in drama, fine arts, mock trial, student council, and several technology-focused organizations, among many others. Timothy Christian High School has a Mock Trial team which has won seven Mock Trial State Championships and had national appearances. For the 2020-2021 school year, Mock Trial competed virtually and Timothy placed third in the state. Timothy Christian High School ACES Team (Academic Challenge in Engineering and Science) won the 2023 State Championship, an academic battle of private and public school scholars across Illinois. VEI, a student-run virtual business plan, also captured the State 2022 title and placed 13th at Nationals.

== History ==
=== Chicago campus ===
The school began as a vision of several members of Douglas Park Christian Reformed Church. In April 1907, a Society for Christian Instruction was formed to explore the possibility of founding a school in the neighborhood known as the "Groninger Hoek." After a year of growth, the society chose the name "Timothy" for their proposed school to honor the New Testament evangelist who had been raised in a Christian home and given spiritual instruction by the apostle Paul. By August 1911, the society had raised enough funds to open the school. They did so above several retail establishments on Roosevelt Road on Chicago's west side.

After a year in this building, the society purchased a lot on the corner of 13th street and Tripp Avenue, a few blocks away from the original premises. This lot was purchased for $1,500. The school would remain in this building for only fifteen years, but in 1916, they received full accreditation from the Chicago Board of Education. The school continued to add rooms to the basement in order to accommodate more students. Initially, the school only served elementary students. By 1918, students were able to continue their education at Chicago Christian High School in the Englewood neighborhood.

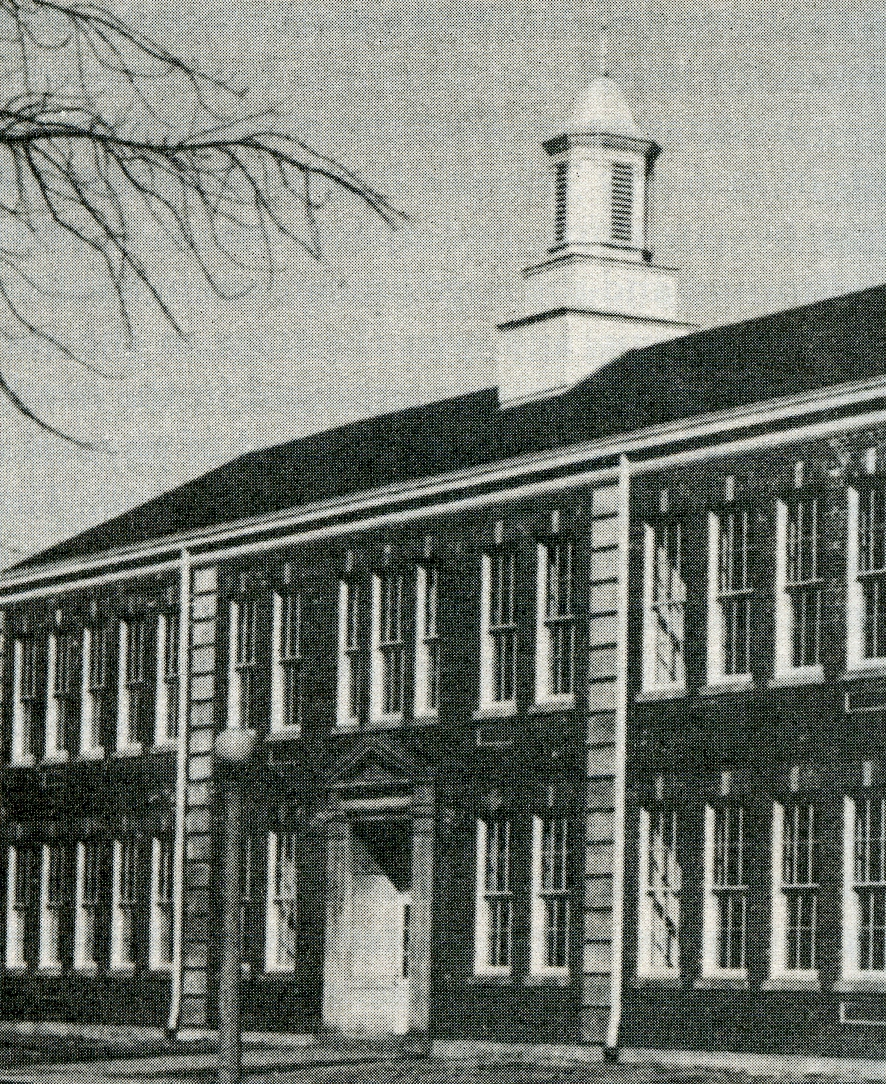
Timothy Christian's second home in Cicero, Illinois

By 1927, the Dutch population had shifted from the west side of the city to the inner western suburbs of Chicago. As the families moved, so did their churches, and parents became less willing to send their children back to schools such as Timothy that remained in the old neighborhood. Early in 1927, Timothy was able to sell its Tripp Avenue school building to a Jewish congregation, but were forced to vacate within six months. Work began on a new building almost immediately. It was decided to build the new school in Cicero, Illinois because it was a central location to many of the families that had relocated west of the city of Chicago. The new school building opened in September 1927 with 156 pupils in four completed rooms on 14th Street.

=== Disbanding Ebenezer School ===
The time in Cicero was marked by two crises for the school. The first was the integration of more than 100 students from Ebenezer Christian School in Chicago. As the Dutch Christian Reformed communities had fled the city for the suburbs, Ebenezer became impossible to keep open. This had been the first Dutch reformed school to open on Chicago's west side in 1893. It closed in 1946, and the huge influx of students to Timothy caused a great deal of tension. Students were forced to endure large class sizes and little time alone with the teachers.

=== Timothy-Lawndale controversy ===
The integration of the students from Ebenezer Christian School was far easier to deal with than the racial integration of the school. In 1965, a group of African American parents attending Lawndale and Garfield Christian Reformed Churches asked the Timothy board permission to enroll their children at the school. Cicero was, at the time, a town with around 70,000 residents of European descent and had earned the reputation as the “Selma of the North.” One black family had attempted to move into the city in 1951 and they had been chased out by a white mob. The Timothy school board decided to delay the enrollment of these students. The board insisted that it was not acting on racist motives, but only that it was worried for the safety of its students. The school only admitted three African American students in 1967 after Timothy Christian High School had moved to the western suburb of Elmhurst.

As Cicero residents continued to harass the school and church members continued to advise against integration, Timothy decided to wait until it could complete the move to a campus in a more racially tolerant suburb. This move to Elmhurst was finally made in 1972. In the meantime, the parents of Lawndale and Garfield Christian Reformed Churches had established their own school, West Side.

== Notable alumni ==
- Rick Huisman, former MLB pitcher
- Wayne Huizenga, founder of Waste Management and AutoNation, former owner of Miami Dolphins, Florida Marlins, and Florida Panthers, former co-owner of Blockbuster
- Peter Huizenga, Waste Management executive and philanthropist
- Seamus Smith, Singer-songwriter
