= St. Charles North High School =

- 255 Red Gate Road; St. Charles, Illinois 60175; United States

Information
- Type: Public Secondary
- School district: Community Unit School District 303
- Principal: Shanna Lewis
- Teaching staff: 130.91 (FTE)
- Grades: 9-12
- Gender: Coed
- Enrollment: 1,902 (2023-2024)
- Student to teacher ratio: 14.43
- Colors: Blue, Silver, Black
- Athletics conference: DuKane Conference
- Mascot: Polaris, the polar bear
- Nickname: North Stars
- Rival: St. Charles East
- Newspaper: Stargazer
- Website: http://north.d303.org

Saint Charles North (SCN) High School is a public four-year high school, located in St. Charles, Illinois, a western suburb of Chicago, Illinois, in the United States. It is part of Community Unit School District 303 which also includes Saint Charles East High School.

== History ==
Originally, the main campus was built in 1995 by Hestrup & Associates as Wredling Middle School with a capacity of 1300; in 1999–2000 it was expanded and converted into St. Charles' second high school at a cost of $41,600,000. The 345,000 square-foot facility now includes a fine-arts wing, with an 880-seat auditorium. Along with this, the athletics wing was expanded to accommodate a gym and mezzanine with 2,530 seats, a natatorium with 8 lanes and seating for 470 people, locker rooms, and weight and training rooms.

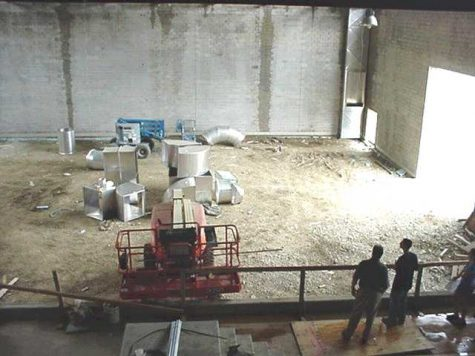
The under construction Saint Charles North natatorium.

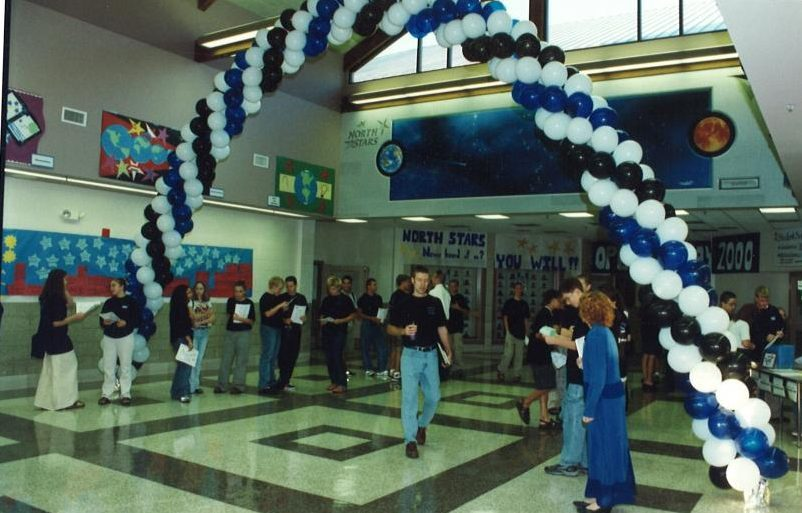
The Saint Charles North main foyer in 2000.

In spring 2001, a serious mold problem was discovered at St. Charles East, the district's other high school, and was determined to be the source of some student illnesses. East students received an extra two weeks of spring break while school board officials decided on the best recourse. For the rest of the 2000–2001 school year, East and North students both used the North campus, on a split schedule, East students in the morning and North students in the afternoon. After repairs, which totaled nearly $30 million, classes resumed their normal locations and schedules the following school year.

== Academics ==
In 2006, Saint Charles North had an average composite ACT score of 22.6 and graduated 100% of its senior class. Saint Charles North has made Adequate Yearly Progress on the Prairie State Achievement Examination, a state test which is mandatory under the No Child Left Behind Act.

St. Charles North High School offers the following Advanced Placement Program courses:

- Biology
- Precalculus
- Calculus AB
- Calculus BC
- Chemistry
- Computer Science A
- English Language
- English Literature
- Environmental Science
- European History
- French Language
- German Language
- Latin
- Macroeconomics
- Music Theory
- Physics
- Psychology
- Spanish Language
- AP Seminar
- Spanish Literature
- Statistics
- Studio Art
- U.S. Government
- U.S. History

Currently, St. Charles North is undergoing curriculum renewal and redesign in partnership with the Illinois Math and Science Academy along with Brown University. The average class size is 22.8.

Fifty St. Charles North students were named AP Scholars for their exceptional performance on the AP tests administered in May 2006.

In the 2007 National Merit Scholarship Program, St. Charles North was represented by two finalists: Alison J. Conn and Raymond H. Hsu. Hsu, the valedictorian for the Class of 2007, and Conn went on to win National Merit Scholarships. The following year, St. Charles North once again boasted two finalists (Patrick Eschenfeldt and Katharine Fragoso) and one winner (Eschenfeldt).

== Athletics ==
Saint Charles North has 35 athletic teams, of which 18 are for boys and 17 are for girls, which compete in the DuKane Conference of the Illinois High School Association.

Boys' Sports

- Baseball
- Basketball
- Bowling
- Cross country
- Diving
- Football
- Frisbee golf
- Golf
- Hockey
- Lacrosse
- Rugby
- Soccer
- Swimming
- Tennis
- Track and field
- Volleyball
- Water polo
- Wrestling

Girls' Sports

- Badminton
- Basketball
- Bowling
- Cheerleading
- Cross country
- Diving
- Drill team
- Golf
- Gymnastics
- Lacrosse
- Soccer
- Softball
- Swimming
- Tennis
- Track and field
- Volleyball
- Water polo

In 2010, St. Charles North was awarded a Blue Ribbon, which honors schools that have achieved high levels of performance or significant improvements with emphasis on schools serving disadvantaged students.

== Mock Trial ==
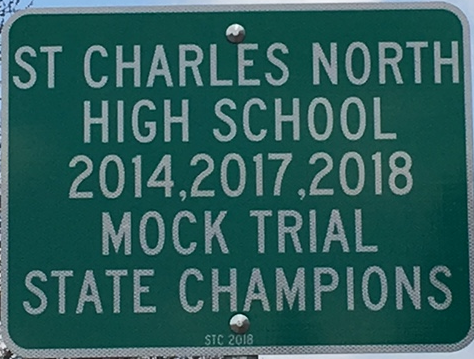
A sign outside the school commemorating the state champion mock trial teams.

- 1st place at the ISBA High School Mock Trial Invitational (2014, 2017, 2018)
- 2nd place at the ISBA High School Mock Trial Invitational (2013, 2015, 2016)
- 10th place at the National High School Mock Trial Championship (2014)
- 3rd place at the Empire World Championship (2016)
- 4th place at the Empire World Championship (2017)

== Notable alumni ==
- Austin Kleba - Professional Speed skater World champion, 2022 USA Olympic team
- Pat Brown - NFL offensive lineman
- Tyler Davis - Kicker for the Penn State University football team
- Jeffery Austin - Singer and contestant on The Voice (U.S. TV series)
- Tyler Nubin, NFL safety for the New York Giants
