= St. Charles Community Unit School District 303 =

Community Unit School District 303
- St. Charles, Illinois

Information
- Other name: D303
- Established: 1949
- Website: district.d303.org

Community Unit School District 303 is a comprehensive K-12 public education system covering 57 square miles (150 km^{2}) in the Fox Valley, 40 miles (64 km) west of Chicago.

District 303 serves nearly 12,000 students from the City of St. Charles and portions of West Chicago, South Elgin, Wayne, Campton Hills, Elburn, a very small portion of Elgin and unincorporated Kane County.

== History ==
When formal school districts were originally created in the late 19th century and early 20th century, they were usually drawn along township boundaries. However, legislation was passed in 1946-47 that encouraged school districts to consolidate. Community Unit School District 303 was born in 1949 when, through a referendum, voters approved consolidating High School District 150, Elementary District 87 and Little Woods District 79.

People served by the Wasco two-year high school program voted in 1950 to consolidate with District 303 after another change in state law eliminated two-year high schools.

== Schools ==
The district operates one early childhood center, 11 elementary schools, two middle schools, two comprehensive high schools, and Compass Academy, serving nearly 12,000 students. Athletes from the two comprehensive high schools belong to the DuKane Conference.

- Elementary and Other (K-5)
  - Anderson Elementary School - Foxes
  - Bell-Graham Elementary School - Bobcats
  - Corron Elementary School - Coyotes
  - Davis Elementary School - Dragons
  - Richmond Elementary School - Tigers
  - Ferson Creek Elementary School - Foxes
  - Fox Ridge Elementary School - Foxes
  - Munhall Elementary School - Mustangs
  - Norton Creek Elementary School - Eagles
  - Wasco Elementary School - Wolves
  - Wild Rose Elementary School - Panthers
  - Early Childhood Center - Fireflies
  - In 2005, District 303 purchased 43 acres (170,000 m^{2}) at the corner of Crane and Silver Glen roads with the intention of building an additional elementary and middle school (in a single joined facility) at that location. Referendums in 2005 and 2006 intended to finance the construction of the schools failed to pass.
- Middle Schools (6-8)
  - Thompson Middle School - Thunder
  - Wredling Middle School - Redhawks
- High Schools (9-12)
  - St. Charles East High School - Saints
  - St. Charles North High School - North Stars
  - Compass Academy - Gators

=== Compass Academy ===
Compass Academy is a District 303 high school program serving grades 9–12, which opened in the fall of 2021 at the Haines Center on South 9th Street in St. Charles. Any District 303 student entering grades 9 through 12 is eligible to enroll, and the school has no entrance criteria. The National Center for Education Statistics classifies it as a non-charter public "other/alternative" school with a 9–12 grade span. The Academy is small by design; the school gives its enrollment capacity as 125 students. Students at the school are known as the Gators.

The Academy uses a competency-based model in which students advance by demonstrating mastery of competencies rather than by accumulating seat time, combined with project-based and interdisciplinary coursework and a flexible schedule that accommodates remote, blended, and evening courses as well as classes at Elgin Community College and the Fox Valley Career Center. The district states that the curriculum addresses the same Illinois Learning Standards as the comprehensive high schools. Students are assigned a home school — either St. Charles East High School or St. Charles North High School — but can elect to take some or all of their courses at Compass. They also remain eligible to participate in athletics and other extracurricular activities at their home high school.

== Students ==
District 303's composite ACT score for 2005 was 21.8, compared to a state average of 20.1. In the same year, 81.7 percent of District 303 students met or exceeded state learning standards (85.8 percent ISAT; 70.4 percent Prairie State Achievement Exam), against a statewide average of 64.9 percent (68.9 percent ISAT; 54.9 percent PSAE).

== Curriculum ==
District 303 staff is actively involved in curriculum renewal and redesign in partnership with the Illinois Mathematics and Science Academy along with Brown University, in the School Year of 2023-2024 District 303 used a new ELA Curriculum from McGraw Hill Education called Wonders. They also have had for a while a Math Curriculum from Great Minds called Eureka Math. Also using the IAR and ISA - (5th grade, 8th) Through 3-5 in Elementary School 6-8 in Middle.

== Parent organizations ==
District 303 parent organizations include school-level and district Parent Teacher Organizations.

== Finances ==
In fiscal year 2006, District 303 operated on a $118.3 million annual operating budget, with total operating revenues of about $120 million. Total expenses including construction and bonded debt were $137 million, against total revenues across all funds of $134 million.

== Staff ==
As of the 2024–2025 school year, D303 employs approximately 1,325 staff members across the district. The district's workforce includes teachers, administrators, paraprofessionals, support staff, nurses, and secretaries. The district also relies on substitutes to support daily operations, with substitute roles available for teachers, nurses, paraprofessionals, and secretaries, coordinated through the district's substitute program. The Human Resources Department oversees employee benefits, compensation, employment, evaluation, labor relations, safety, and substitute procurement for all district staff.

== Teacher profile ==
The average teacher salary in 2005 was $52,502. The average teacher had 10.9 years of experience in 2004-2005. About 57 percent of District 303 teachers hold master's degrees or higher.

== Growth ==
District 303 grew significantly since the start of the 21st century. About 250 new students enrolled in District 303 for the 2005-06 school year. Growth of 300-500 new students was expected to continue for the next three to five years.

== Facilities and reorganization ==
=== Davis-Richmond merger (2010) ===
In 2010, the school district decided to combine Davis, an overcrowded elementary school, and Richmond, a failing school that was only at 50% capacity, to create Davis Primary (grades K-2) and Richmond Intermediate (grades 3-5). The schools are close together so transportation was easy. The school days at Richmond were made 40 minutes longer. Spanish and French language courses were offered and every student was given their own tablet. Both schools have since returned to a standard K–5 elementary configuration.

=== Thompson Middle School Modernization (2017) ===
In 2016, the D303 School Board approved a major modernization plan for Thompson Middle School, with construction beginning in the summer of 2017. The renovation added air conditioning, 31 new classrooms, 11 new science labs, a new auxiliary gym, an expanded cafeteria, and a new track and field area, along with a newly constructed bus drop-off and pick-up area designed to improve traffic flow on Indiana and 7th Streets. Upon completion, Thompson grew to approximately 196,000 square feet, nearly double its previous 110,000-square-foot size. The roughly $39 million Thompson renovation was part of a larger $47 million middle school overhaul for D303, which also included additions to Wredling Middle School and the consolidation of the district's three middle schools down to two — resulting in the closure of Haines Middle School. The renovated Thompson Middle School was unveiled to the community at an open house on August 20, 2019.

=== Haines Center ===
In 2015, District 303 closed Haines Middle School on South 9th Street in St. Charles following the modernization of the nearby Thompson Middle School and the consolidation of the district's middle schools from three to two.

Compass Academy opened in the building in the fall of 2021. Beginning with the 2024–25 school year, the district's early childhood programming relocated to the Haines Center from Fox Ridge, following $8.6 million in renovations that included two new playgrounds, updated classrooms, and new framing, insulation and windows. Board members had approved more than $7 million in construction contracts for the building in January 2024, including asbestos and lead-based paint abatement. The Haines Center now houses both the Early Childhood Center and Compass Academy.

=== Fox Ridge ===
In 2018, Fox Ridge Elementary was shut down and converted into an Early Childhood Center. In October 2023, The D303 School Board decided to change Fox Ridge Early Childhood Center into an Elementary School, The Early Childhood Center will be moved to the former Hanes Middle.

=== Lincoln Elementary School Closure (2024) ===
Built in 1928, Lincoln Elementary closed primarily due to a combination of factors. D303 officials decided to repurpose Lincoln Elementary as part of a broader plan to handle overcrowding in other parts of the district and decrease class sizes. The district considered using Lincoln for administrative office space, with little to no student programming remaining at the building.

Lincoln was the smallest elementary school in the district, operating as a "two-section" building for many years, meaning there were only two class sections per grade level. Its small size made it less efficient to operate compared to larger buildings in the district.

The changes were tied to a larger reshuffling that also involved Fox Ridge Early Childhood Center being converted back into an elementary school, with early childhood programming being relocated to the Haines Center — all designed to address "hot spot" areas in the district where student enrollment growth was expected in the coming years.

The closure was controversial, with community members launching a petition to save the school, arguing that Lincoln's downtown St. Charles location was important to the surrounding neighborhood and local businesses, and that D303 had already spent $1.9 million upgrading the building since 2000.

Its last school year was 2023–2024, after which Lincoln School began housing the District's Transition Program and other services.

=== Richmond Elementary Renovation (2026) ===
In 2026, D303 approved a $6.35 million renovation and addition at Richmond Elementary School, located at 300 S. 12th Street in St. Charles. The upgrades were designed to expand and modernize the school to better accommodate the district's growing enrollment, with construction beginning in late February following a ceremonial groundbreaking on February 19, 2026. The project includes two new classrooms, additional auxiliary spaces, interior renovations, replacement of the gym flooring, and partial roof replacement, as well as improvements to sidewalks and exterior pavement. Principal Lisa Simoncelli-Bulak noted that the addition provides greater flexibility to respond to enrollment changes without disrupting instructional quality. All construction is projected to be completed by August 2026, in time for the start of the 2026–2027 school year.
