= St. Charles East High School =

Coordinates: 41.929373°N 88.281466°W

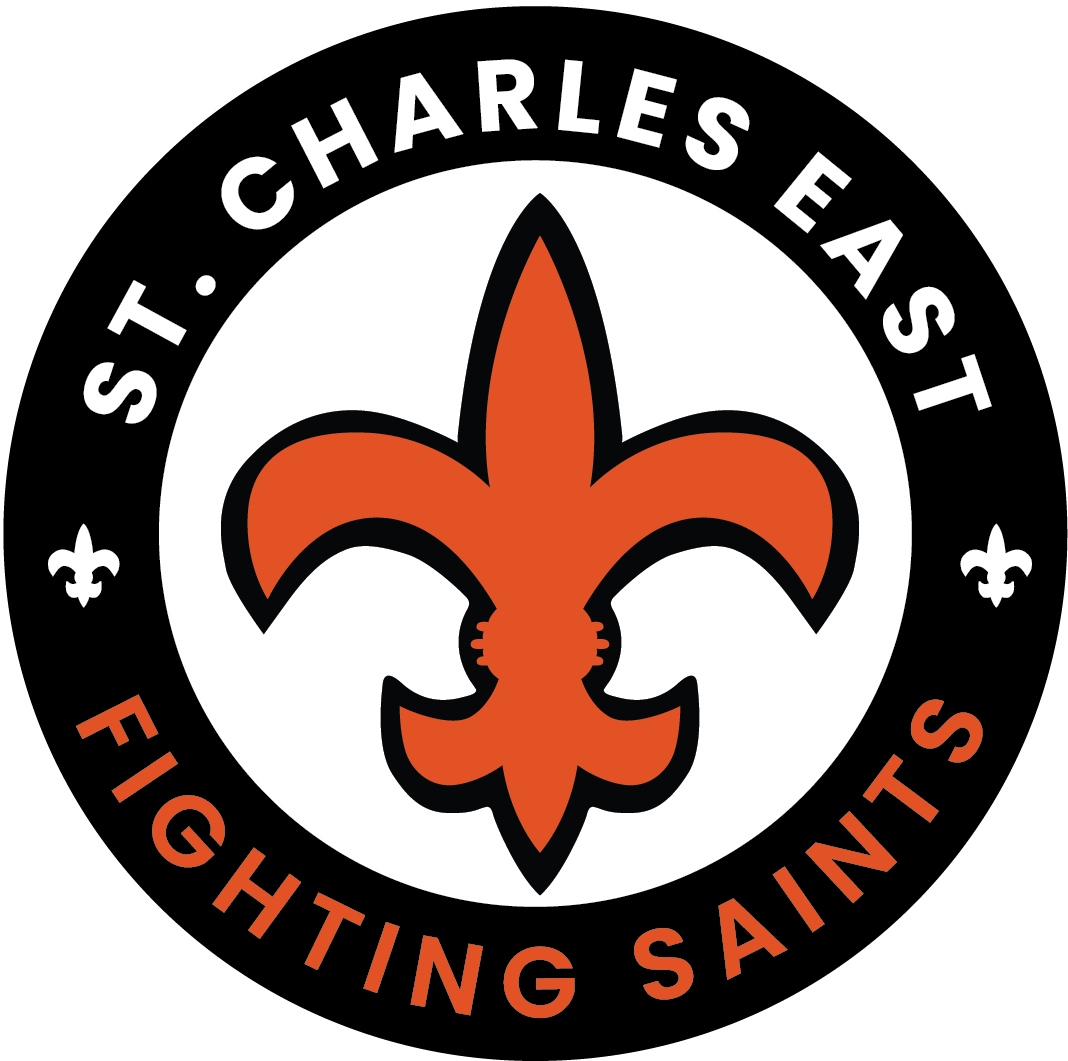

Location
- 1020 Dunham Road; St. Charles, Illinois 60174; United States

Information
- Type: Public secondary
- Established: 1977
- Principal: James Richter
- Teaching staff: 146.67 (on an FTE basis)
- Grades: 9–12
- Enrollment: 1,984 (2023-2024)
- Student to teacher ratio: 13.53
- Campus: Suburban
- Colors: Orange and Black
- Athletics conference: DuKane Conference
- Team name: Fighting Saints
- Newspaper: X-Ray
- Yearbook: Halo
- Website: http://east.d303.org/

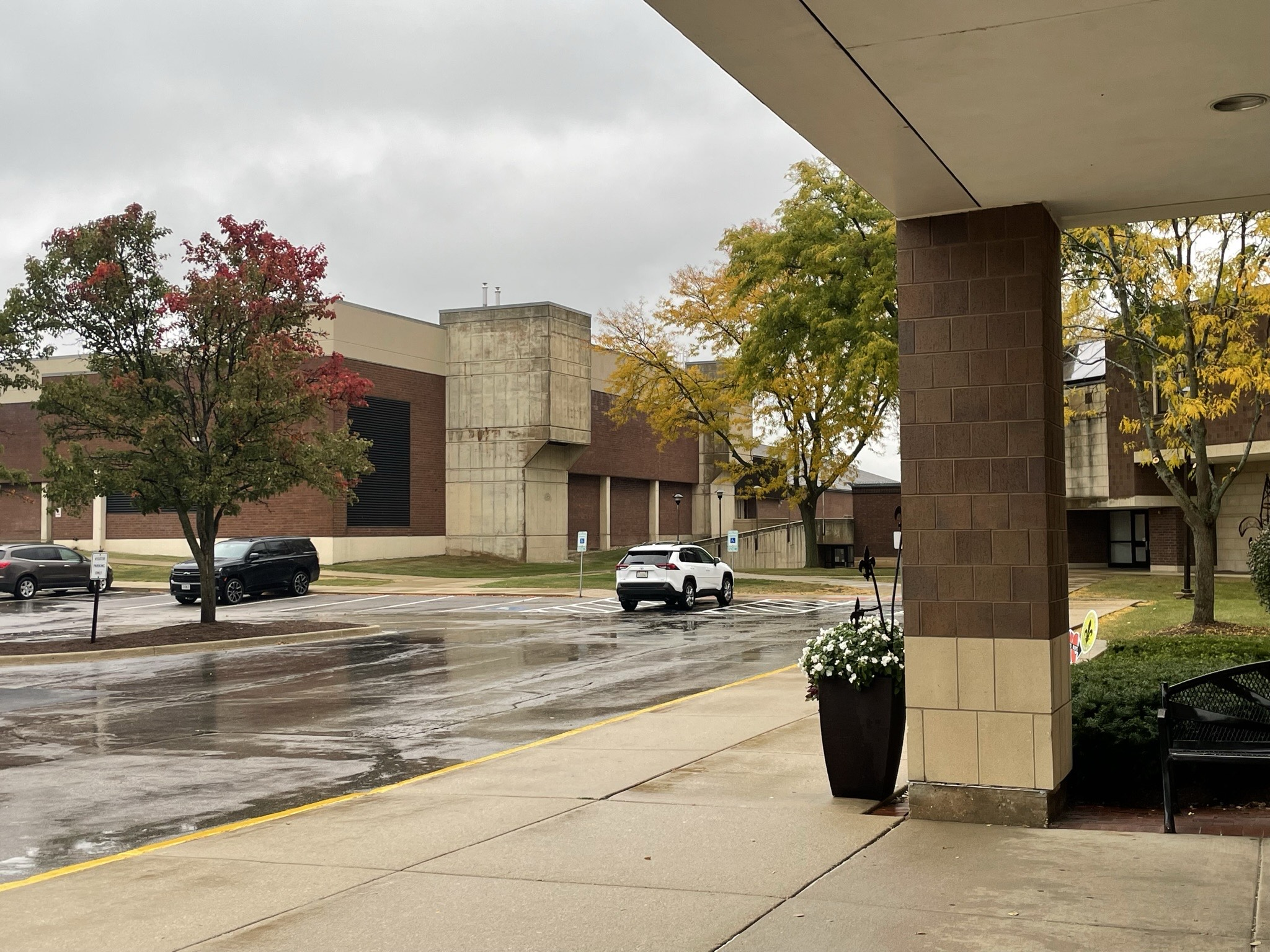
Looking northwest towards the John B. Norris Recreation Center.

St. Charles East High School is a public four-year high school located in St. Charles, Illinois, a western suburb of Chicago, Illinois, in the United States. It is part of Community Unit School District 303. The school was known as "St. Charles High School" from its opening in 1977 until fall of 2000 when a second school in the city, St. Charles North High School, was opened. At that time the school name changed to "St. Charles East High School."

== History ==
St. Charles East High School is located at 1020 Dunham Road in St. Charles, Illinois. At one time it was the only high school serving the city of St. Charles. Prior to moving to its current location in 1977, the high school was located in the middle of town at the corner of Main Street and Seventh Street, in the building that now serves as Thompson Middle School. The new St. Charles High School campus was built in the open fields to the east of Dunham Road, adjacent to the existing Norris Recreation Center and Dunham Junior High School (which educated 7th graders for the 1975–76 and 1976–77 school years before being annexed into the new High School campus for the 1977–78 school year). The campus change was not made without controversy – the old downtown campus was an "open" campus that allowed the student body to depart and return during the school day, while the new campus is "closed". The combined complex was constructed in a Brutalist style. The first month in the new school featured student protests, leaky roofs, and problems with the school's (at the time) state-of-the-art solar heating system. The first class to graduate after attending all four years at the newly built high school was the class of 1981.

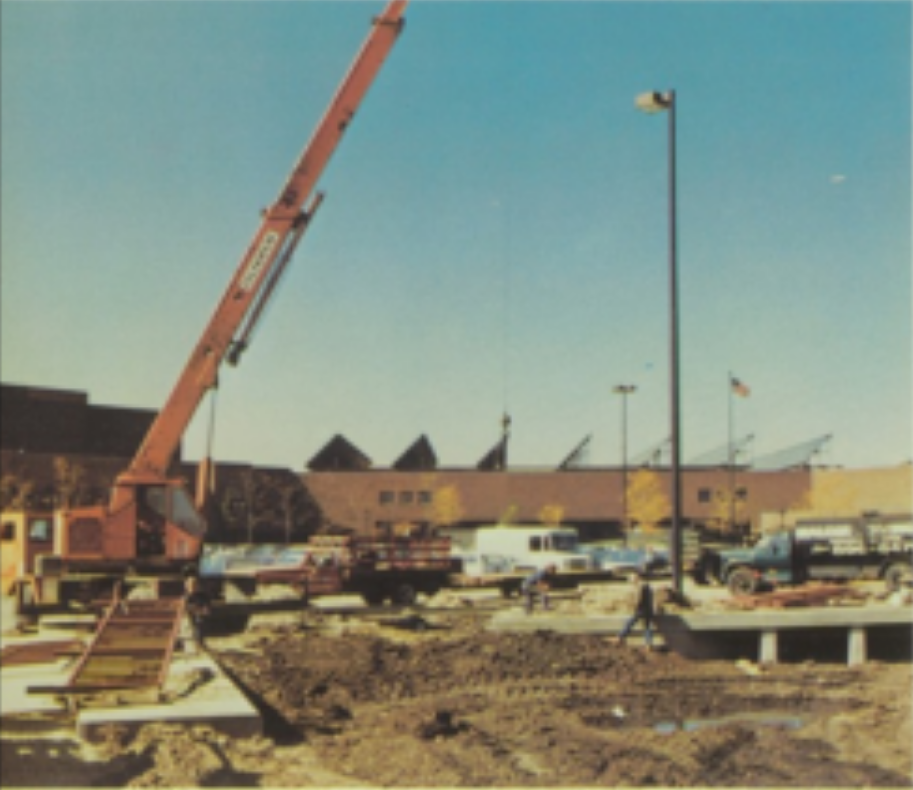
The construction of the Lester J. Norris Sports Complex during the early 1980s. Pictured in the background is STCE's original solar heating system.

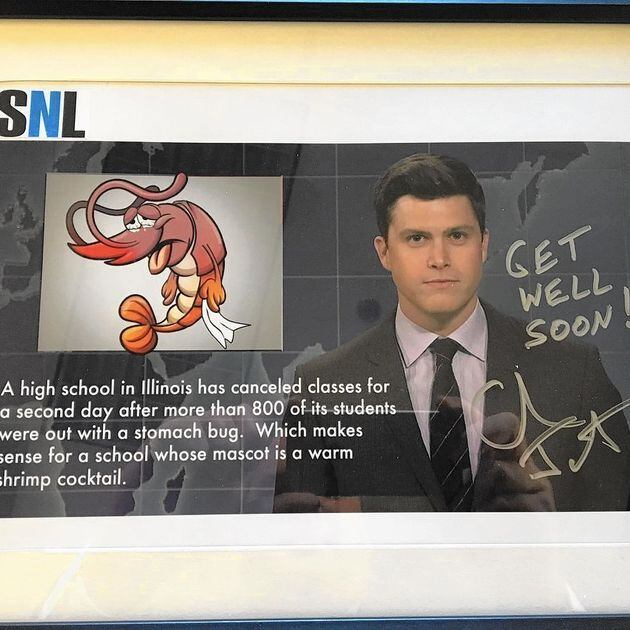
A signed photograph by SNL's Colin Jost for East. In 2017, the school was featured on the show's Weekend Update segment.

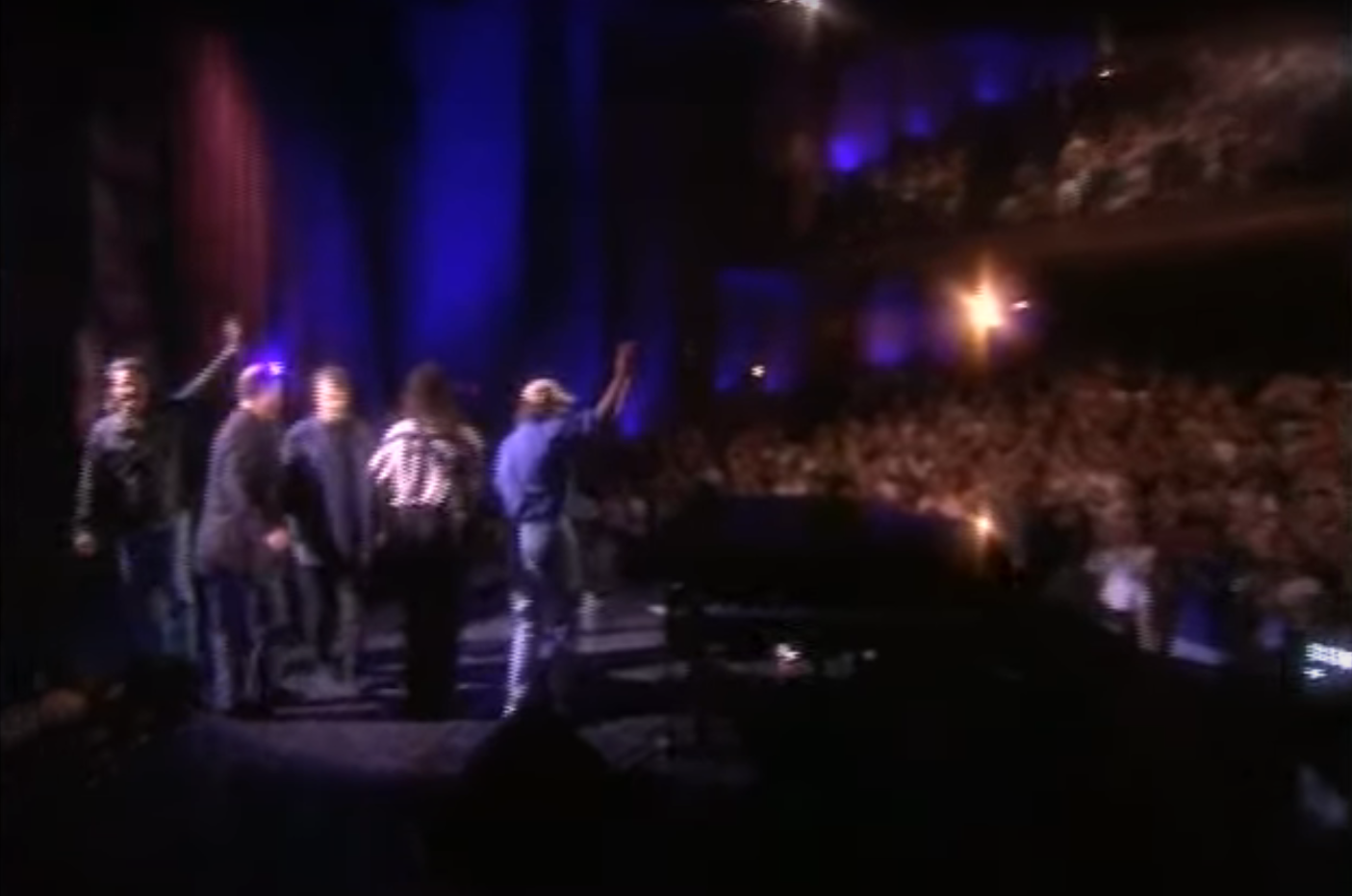
Brian Wilson and Bruce Johnston of The Beach Boys perform with Christopher Cross and Timothy B. Schmidt at the Norris Cultural Arts Center in 1998.

In the year 2000, due to increasing population in the area, District 303 was split between two high schools, and St. Charles High School was renamed St. Charles East High School. (A new high school, St. Charles North High School, was built on the west side of town). The first class to graduate after attending all four years at the renamed school graduated in 2004. The Saint Charles East High School campus includes the Norris Cultural Arts Center, and the Norris Recreation Center. These facilities were established to serve not only the high school but the community as well. The Dellora A. Norris Cultural Arts Center, a 1,000-seat performing arts theater and art gallery, was founded in 1978 with funding from the St. Charles Charities, which was created in 1924 by Lester and Dellora Norris and Edward Baker.

Beginning in the early 1990s, the school was the subject of repeated complaints from students and teachers who said that they developed health problems while in the building. The school district spent $5.6 million renovating the building, but the complaints continued. In March 2001, a former student who graduated in 1999 sued the school district, claiming that she developed a lasting chronic sinus infection while attending classes in the building. A subsequent investigation discovered Stachybotrys black mold in one wing of the building, and students were told not to return from spring break while air quality tests continued. Starting in mid-April and for the rest of the 2001 school year, St. Charles East students shared a split-schedule with St. Charles North High School. East students attended class at the North campus during the morning, while North students went during the afternoon. During the summer of 2001 through the next school year, the school underwent an enormous renovation. For the entire 2001–2002 school year, the current students had to take classes in the adjacent Wredling Middle School building and mobile classrooms surrounding it (brought in specifically to accommodate the larger student body). Meanwhile, the Wredling Middle School students took classes in mobile classrooms parked in a field between Haines and Thompson Middle Schools. The renovation was completed in time for the beginning of the 2002–2003 school year, and all classes returned to their normal locations.

== Academics ==
In 2011, Saint Charles East had an average composite ACT score of 19.0 and a graduation rate of 89.8%. The average class size is 23.3. Saint Charles East has made Adequate Yearly Progress on the Prairie State Achievement Examination, a state test part of the No Child Left Behind Act.

== Athletics ==
Saint Charles East has 29 athletic teams, of 14 boys' and 15 girls' teams, which compete in the DuKane Conference and Illinois High School Association. Saint Charles East's mascot is King Charles. In the 1998–1999 school year, St. Charles East set an IHSA State Record for most State Championships won by a school with a total of 7 (not including Color Guard or Drill Team). St. Charles East Girls' Soccer was a prevailing and dominant legacy during the 1990s, winning eight IHSA soccer state championships in 1990, 1992, 1994, 1996, 1997, 1998, 1999, and 2000. In 1978/79, the fledgling St. Charles High School Boys' Swim Team won its first state championship. St. Charles boys' won in 1980, 1982, 1983, 1984, 1985 and 1986.

At one time, signs hung at the city limits next to the population sign that stated, "Welcome to St. Charles, State Capital of Illinois High School Swimming for the 1980s." There were also championship wins in swimming in 1993, 1997, and 1999.

The St. Charles Girls' Swim Team won consecutive state championships from 1994/95 through 1999/2000. Swimming World Magazine named St. Charles the public high school girls' "Team of the Year" in both 1999 and 2000. The streak was broken in the 2000/2001 school year when the new St. Charles North High School was opened and the pool of athletic talent in the school district was divided. The renamed St. Charles East finished third that year while St Charles North finished 9th.

- 2006 Upstate Eight Conference Football Champions
- 2008 Illinois High School Association Volleyball Champions
- 2009 Upstate Eight Conference Football Champions
- 2012 Upstate Eight Conference Boys' Soccer Champions
- 2019 Illinois High School Association Boys' Cross Country - State Champions

== Notable alumni ==
- Wes Benjamin, Texas Rangers pitcher
- Chrissy Chlapecka, singer and Internet personality
- Ethan Cutkosky, actor
- Matthew Coronato, Calgary Flames forward
- Dave Harbour, former Minnesota Vikings center
- Clayton Isbell, college football safety for the Coastal Carolina Chanticleers
- Marci Jobson, US women's international soccer player and head coach at Baylor University.
- Tera Moody, long distance runner
- Karen Morrison-Comstock, Miss USA 1974
- Gabe Nyenhuis, former NFL defensive lineman
- Karen A. Page, two-time James Beard Award-winning author of Becoming a Chef and other books
- Pete Ploszek, actor
- Wayne Randazzo, sportscaster
- Matt Reynolds, former MLB pitcher
- Chris Witaske, actor
- Rick Wohlhuter, 1972 Olympic 800 meter bronze medalist, 1000 meter American record holder
- Margaret Jane Wray, operatic soprano, 1981
- Randy Wright, former Green Bay Packers quarterback
