= Baker Hotel (Baker, Montana) =

- U.S. National Register of Historic Places
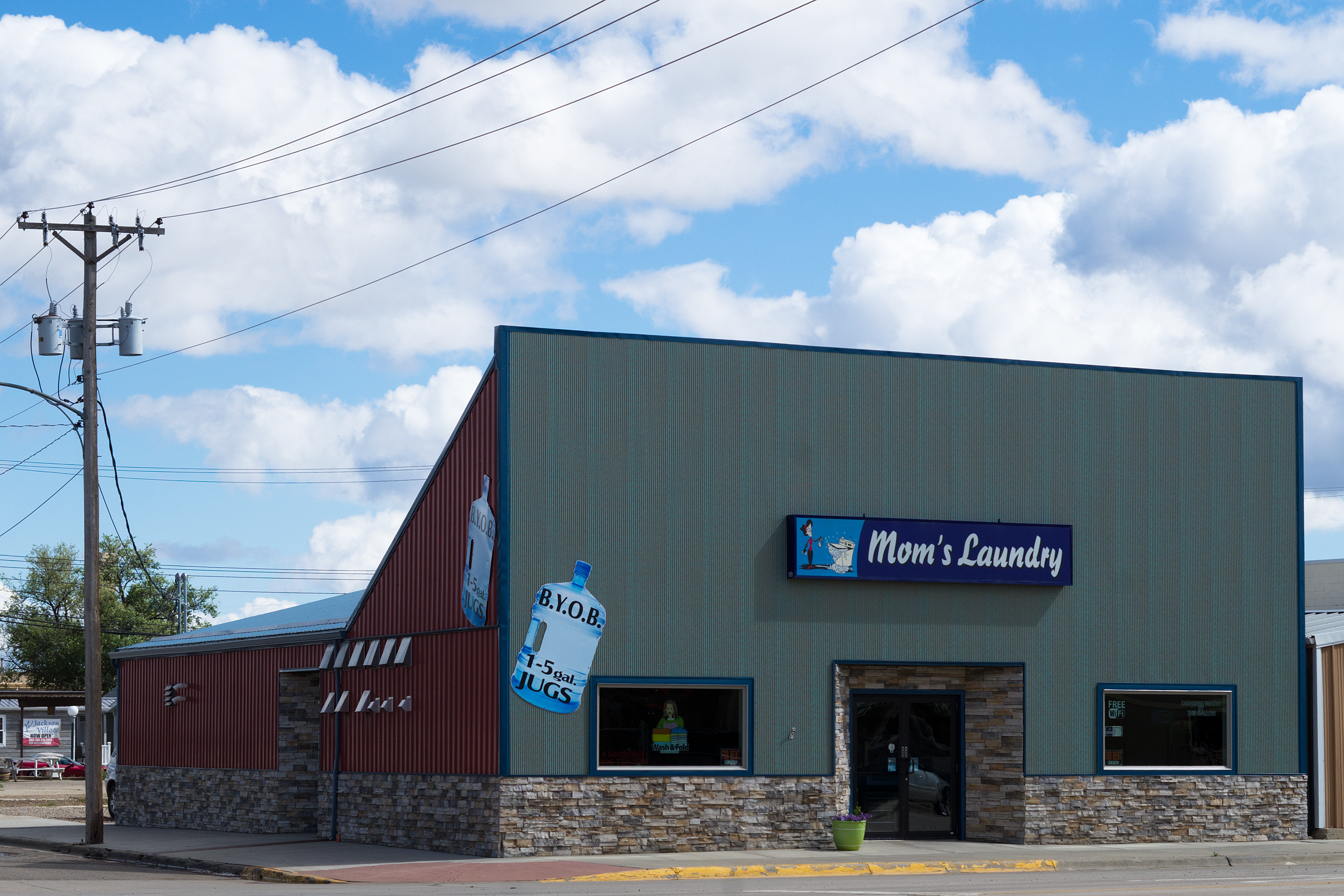
- Site of the building

- Location within Montana Location within the United States
- Location: 4 South Main St., Baker, Montana
- Coordinates: 46°22′07″N 104°16′28″W
- Area: less than one acre
- Built: 1916
- Built by: Pratt, Jack
- Architectural style: Western Commercial
- NRHP reference No.: 04001435
- Added to NRHP: January 5, 2005

The Baker Hotel is a historic site listed on the National Register of Historic Places located in Baker, Montana, at the southeast corner of Main Street and Railroad Avenue. It was added to the Register on January 5, 2005.

The hotel was a two-story brick commercial building built in 1916 and opened in 1917. In 2004, it was the second oldest brick building in Baker. When listed in 2004, the building was owned by the City of Baker, and it had been vacant for 15 years.

The hotel has been destroyed and replaced by another building.
