= Chicago Christian High School =

Location
- 12001 South Oak Park Avenue; Palos Heights, Illinois 60468; United States
- 41.5138°N 87.9298°W

Information
- Principal: Mike Drury
- Grades: 9-12
- Color
- Athletics conference: Chicagoland Christian Conference
- Team name: Knights
- Website: swchristian.org

Chicago Christian High School or CCHS is a private Christian school in Palos Heights, Illinois. In addition to offering a wide range of academic programs, Chicago Christian High School also offers Dual Enrollment courses, Advanced Placement courses, and Honors Courses. It also hosts a Robotics team, which is sponsored by many small businesses in Palos Heights. It's ranked 16 as one of the best Christian school's in the Chicago land area and looks to improve students for college. It is made up by students from the campus’s in Tinley Park and Oak Lawn. Additionally, some students are not from either campus, but from other schools entirely, or are transfers.

History: Chicago Southwest Christian Association were formed back in 1958, while Chicago Christian High School was founded in 1918 in Englewood. They moved into Palos Heights in 1963 and working to imply better learning with academics and faith. The campus is on the former Navajo golf course, where the idea for the NIV version of the Bible was established.
