= Arcada Theater Building =

- Arcada Theatre
- U.S. National Register of Historic Places
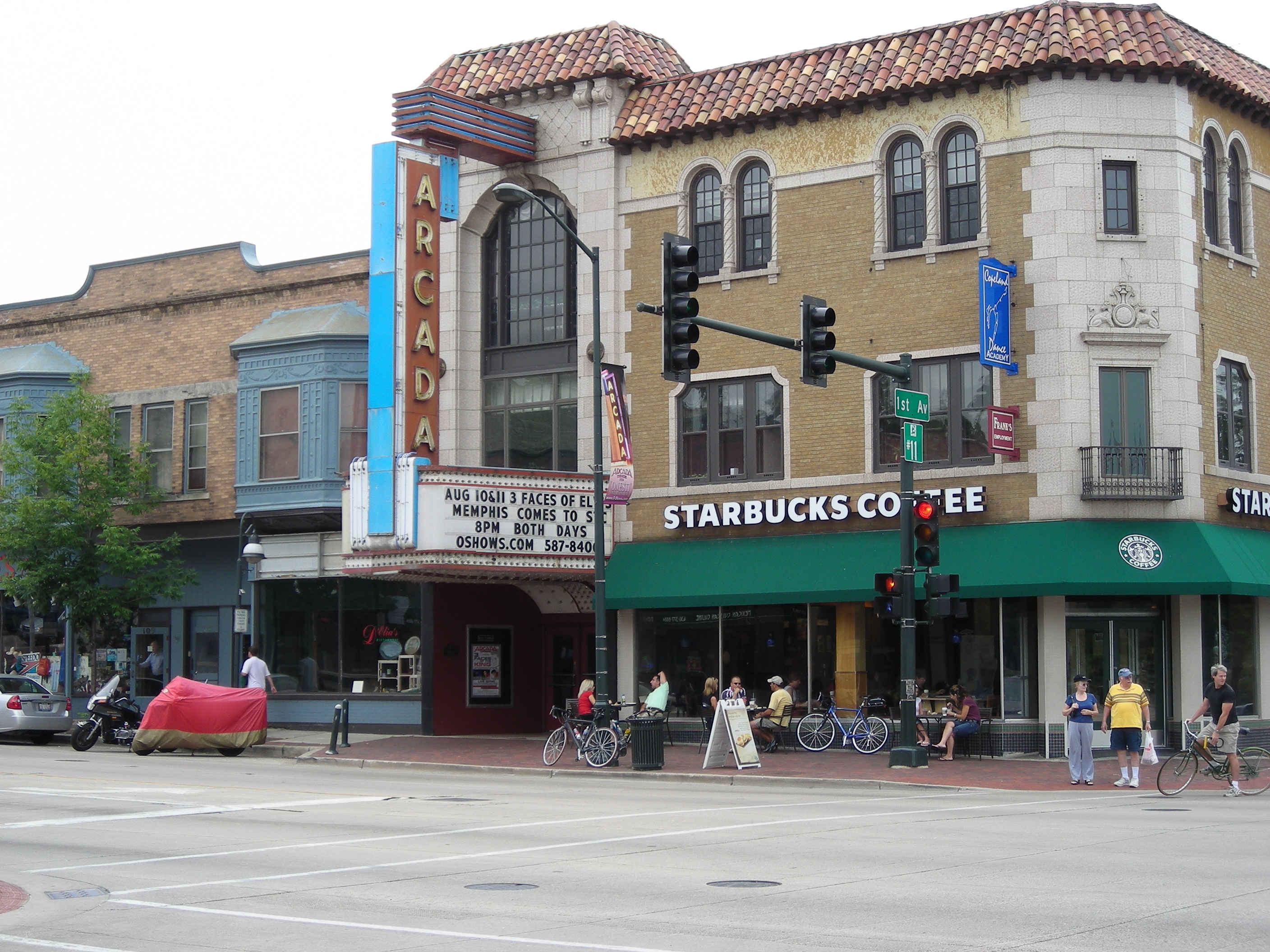
- Location: Main Street (North Avenue), St Charles, Kane County, Illinois, United States
- Coordinates: 41°54′49.2″N 88°18′43.31″W
- Built: 1926
- Architects: Behrns, Elmer F.
- Architectural style: Mission/Spanish Revival, Moderne
- NRHP reference No.: 94000977
- Added to NRHP: August 16, 1994

The Arcada Theatre Building is a theater in St. Charles, Illinois, located on Main Street (which becomes North Avenue (Chicago) further eastward). The theatre was opened on Labor Day, September 6, 1926, engaging projection of silent movies and the staging of live vaudeville acts. Except for brief periods of renovation, it has remained continuously open. It is listed on the National Register of Historic Places.

== History ==
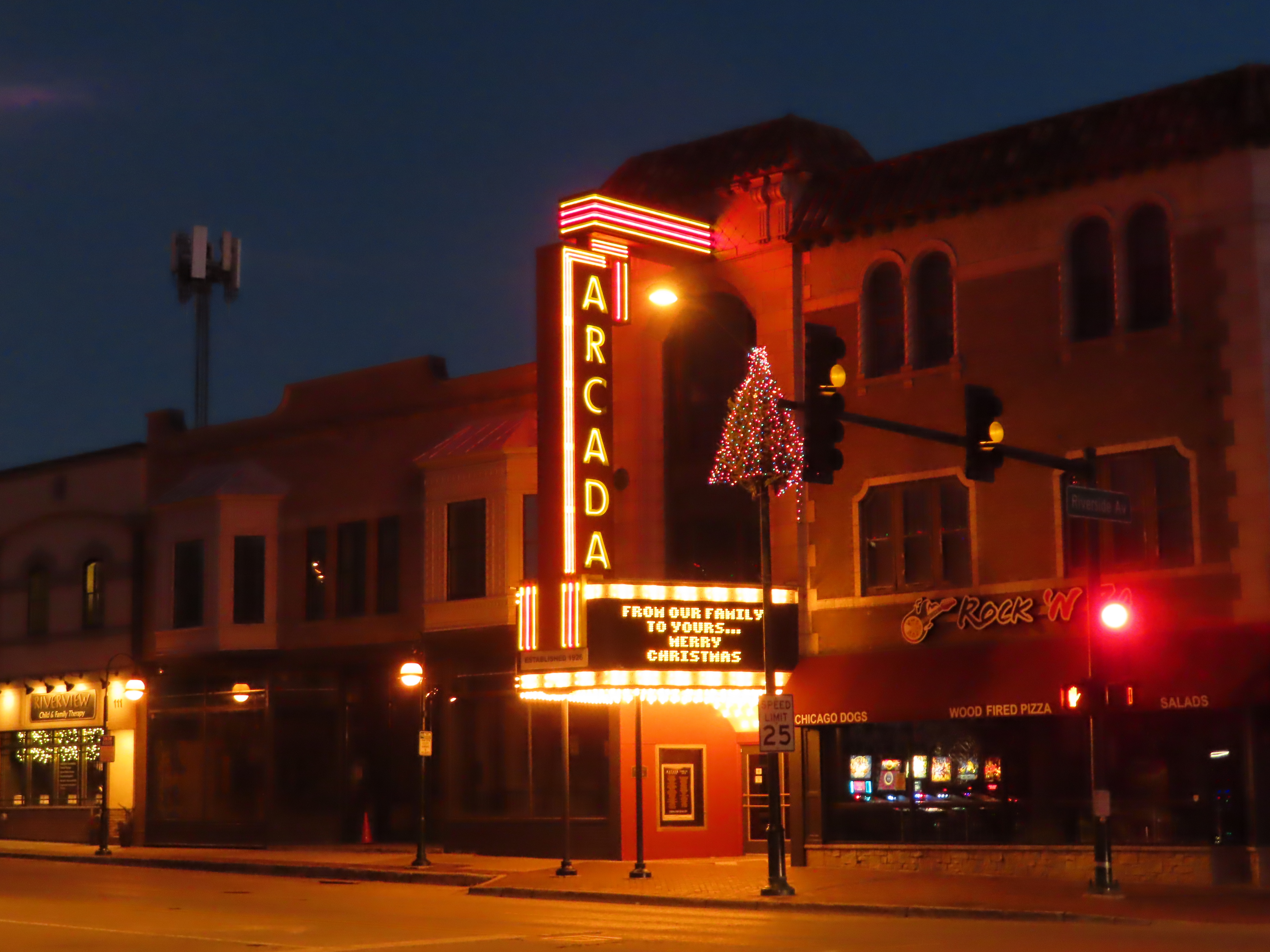
At night in 2021

The Arcada Theatre was built in 1926 by local millionaires Dellora A. and Lester J. Norris. Mr. Norris, a commercial artist and Chicago Tribune cartoonist, designed the interior of the Arcada. The exterior, designed by Elmer Behrns, is as a prime example of the Spanish Colonial Revival Style. Behrns also designed The Egyptian Theatre in DeKalb, Illinois.

The new theatre was a $500,000 example of the Norris family's confidence in the future of St. Charles. With only 5,000 residents in the town, more than 1,009 seats were installed.

Upon the Arcada's grand opening, the public came in such large numbers that hundreds were unable to gain entrance. Chicagoans arrived by a special railway car to see the featured film "The Last Frontier" and the Vaudeville acts of Fibber McGee and Molly. Patrons also heard a recital on the famous $25,000 Marr and Colton pipe organ, later enlarged (1928–29) by the local Geneva Organ Company with an art deco silver and red console, adorned with carved herons, native to the Fox River Valley.

The Arcada became known as one of the outstanding Vaudeville houses in the Fox River Valley. Many legendary stars have graced the stage, including George Burns and Gracie Allen, Judy Garland, Edgar Bergen and Charlie McCarthy, Olivia de Havilland, the John Philip Sousa Band, Liberace, Mitzi Gaynor, Cornelia Otis Skinner, Vincent Price, Carol Channing, Jeanette MacDonald, Walter Slezak and the Von Trapp Family Singers.

In May 2005, Ron Onesti, president of The Onesti Entertainment Corporation (OEC), assumed ownership of its operations only. He does not own the Arcada Theatre building. Making use of its standing as a producer of entertainment shows in the United States, the OEC brought marquee performances typical of major city downtowns to the far western suburbs of Chicago.

Today, the Arcada Theatre is an 897-seat venue featuring its original pipe organ that rises from within the stage floor. Among other notable performers, The B-52's, 38 Special, Poi Dog Pondering, Sophia Loren, Mickey Rooney, Shirley MacLaine, Jerry Lewis, Frank Sinatra Jr. (2015), Dionne Warwick, Joan Rivers, Paul Anka, Kenny Rogers, Pat Benatar, Three Dog Night, Petula Clark (2017), Wayne Newton, Frankie Avalon, Dana Carvey (2012), Molly Ringwald (2013), Corey Feldman (2017), Scott Weiland (2015), Fastball (2021), Rich Little, Eric Burdon, Gladys Knight (2022), Howie Mandel, The Lettermen, and Martin Short have been recent headliners. The theatre also functions a resource for community groups and local performers when not occupied by mainliner events.

Comedian Andrew Dice Clay recorded his Showtime special "Indestructible" at the theater in August 2012.
