= Edward J. Baker =

American philanthropist

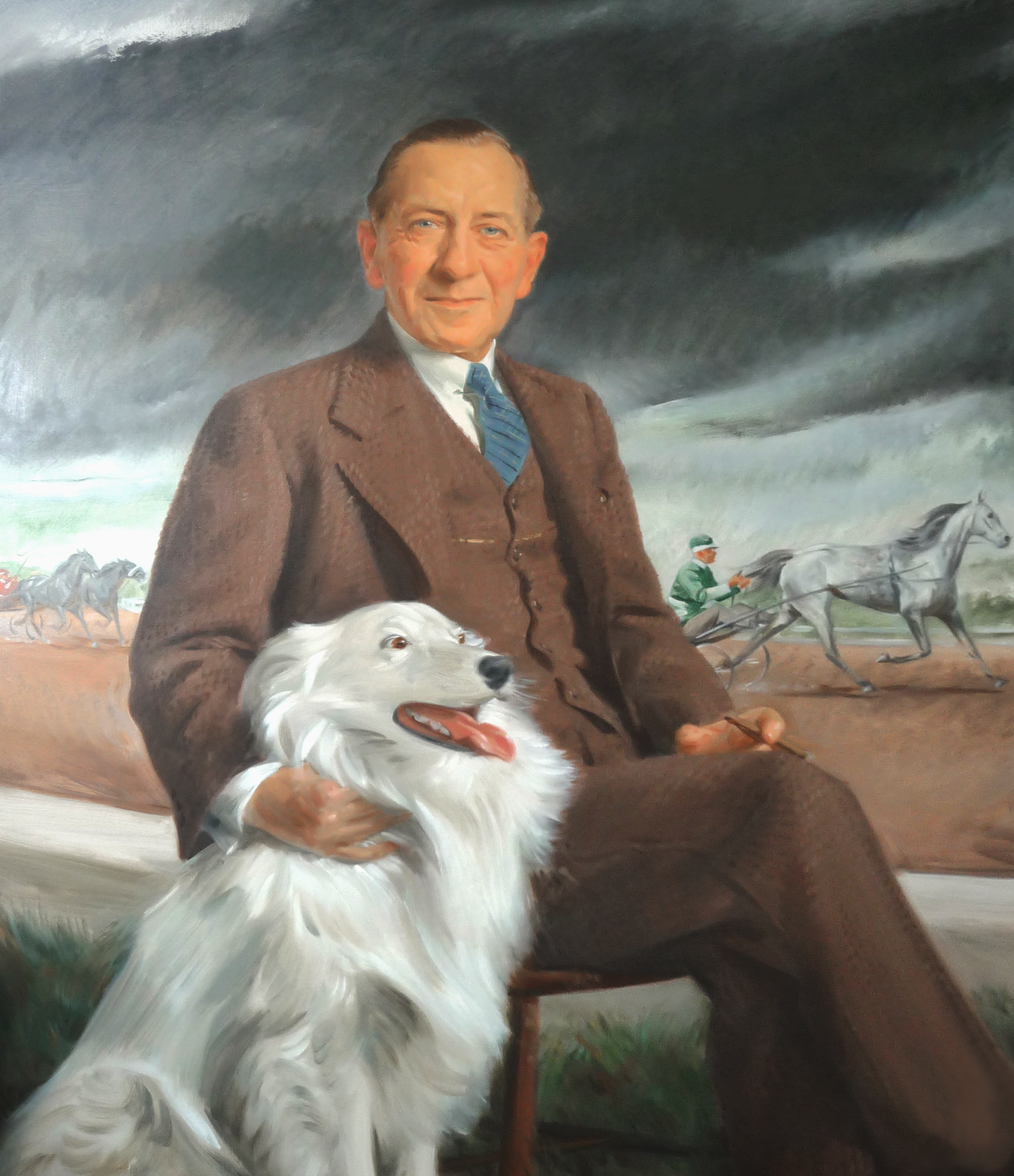
- Born: September 30, 1868; St. Charles, Illinois, United States
- Died: January 17, 1959 (aged 90)
- Occupation: Farmer
- Spouse: Harriet Rockwell Baker
- Children: Henry Rockwell Baker
- Parents: Edward Baker; Martha Baker

Signature
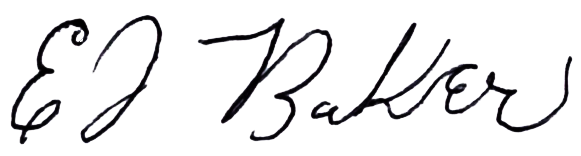

Colonel Edward John Baker was an American philanthropist from St. Charles, Illinois, regarded highly for his generosity toward his hometown.

== Early life ==
Col. Baker was born in St. Charles on a farm west of town to parents Edward and Martha Baker. His father, Edward Baker, was born in New York, but located in Kane County when young.

Col. Baker attended the west side school in St. Charles until he was nineteen years of age. Having an upbringing on a farm, he considered himself to be "first and foremost a farmer."

He attended Bryant & Stratton Business College in St. Louis for one year, taking a commercial course, and subsequently clerked in a hardware store in St. Charles and was connected as a part of the St. Charles Mercantile Company for one year.

At the end of that time he was appointed Inspector of Grain and Railroad as well as being made Warehouse Commissioner by Governor John Riley Tanner. Col. Baker served that position for a period of ten years under the Governors Tanner, Yates, and Deneen, until his resignation in July 1907.

Col. Baker chose not to pursue any career endeavors following 1907—but represented the Republican Party of Kane County, partook in local charities, and harbored a great interest in horse racing.

Baker was married to Harriet Rockwell, daughter of H.T. Rockwell, in St. Charles in December 1889.

== Bet A Million Gates ==
Baker's sister, Dellora, married John Warne Gates in 1874. He was nicknamed "Bet A Million" Gates because of a 1900 race track bet for which he actually won $600,000. Rumors raised the sum to $1 million. Gates was said to be willing to wager on anything, including which of two raindrops would trickle down a pane of glass first. Gates sold barbed wire, invented by Joseph Glidden and eventually started his own company to manufacture it. He also ventured into the steel industry. Gates' oil investments led to his founding the Texaco Oil Company. Upon Gates's death in 1911, his fortune was left to his widow, Dellora, and son, Charlie. Charlie Gates died in 1913; Dellora died in 1918. Dellora willed the fortune to her brother, Edward J. Baker of St. Charles, and her niece Dellora Frances Angell.

== How Edward J. Baker became a Colonel ==
He was commissioned by Governor Ruby Laffoon of Kentucky as part of the Honorary Order of Kentucky Colonels, of the Commonwealth of Kentucky, in 1935.

Greyhound, Baker's famous trotter, he purchased as a yearling in 1933. Greyhound was the winner of seventeen international records during his racing career.

== Harriet Rockwell ==
Col. Baker's wife, Harriet, was two years older than he was, born in 1866. She lived to be 73, dying in 1940 of a sudden heart attack. Col. Baker was confined to Geneva Community Hospital at the time of her death, in between, and undergoing multiple surgeries. She had expressed a wish that she precede her husband in death. Mrs. Baker died suddenly, though she had been suffering from heart trouble for some years. The morning that she died, she was at home planning a cherry picking bee on the Crystal Brook Farm owned by her and Col. Baker.

The Bakers had one child, a son, they named Henry Rockwell Baker. He lived to be 23, dying in 1914 of a tuberculosis infection. His widow, Nina Carlson, remained close with the Baker family.

== Building Projects ==
In 1928, Baker built the Hotel Baker in St. Charles, Illinois. The building is now on the US National Register of Historic Places.

To my friends and neighbors in St. Charles:

I have been asked for a message to give you in this booklet. I will respond by saying, that if, in this my third effort to build beauty and utility in your town and mine, it will bring to you and your children happier moments and make you and them a little more pleased with this lovely old city; if it will cause you and them to think more tenderly of their home town and give them a little more pride in dear old St. Charles, then I will have brought nearer my realization of an ideal which I have held in my heart ever since it was made possible to share with all St. Charles, the beauty and utility which together make for advancement. Trusting that Hotel Baker meets your expectations and that it will be to you and your friends a fulfillment of a cherished hope, I am,

Yours for St. Charles,

Edward J. Baker

The first major donation Col. Baker made to St. Charles was the Baker Community Center, named the Henry Rockwell Baker Memorial Community Center in honor of his son Henry, who had died twelve years preceding the building's 1926 dedication.

Colonel Baker also supported the construction of the St. Charles National Bank Building and his "pride and joy," the Hotel Baker, both opened in the late 1920s.

In 1940 he donated toward the construction of a new town hall building, the St. Charles Municipal Building.

In 1952, in honor of his parents, Col. Baker gave funding for his last major project, the Baker Memorial United Methodist Church.

Two years preceding Col. Baker's death in 1959, a park was dedicated in 1957 next to the Baker United Methodist Church, and was named Baker Memorial Park.

== Bibliography ==
- Schriftgiesser, Karl (1943). Oscar of the Waldorf. E. P. Dutton & Co. hdl:2027/uc1.$b667509.
- Wendt, Lloyd; Kogan, Herman (1948). Bet a million! The story of John W. Gates. Bobbs-Merrill. hdl:2027/mdp.39015002974452.
