= St. Charles, Illinois =

- City
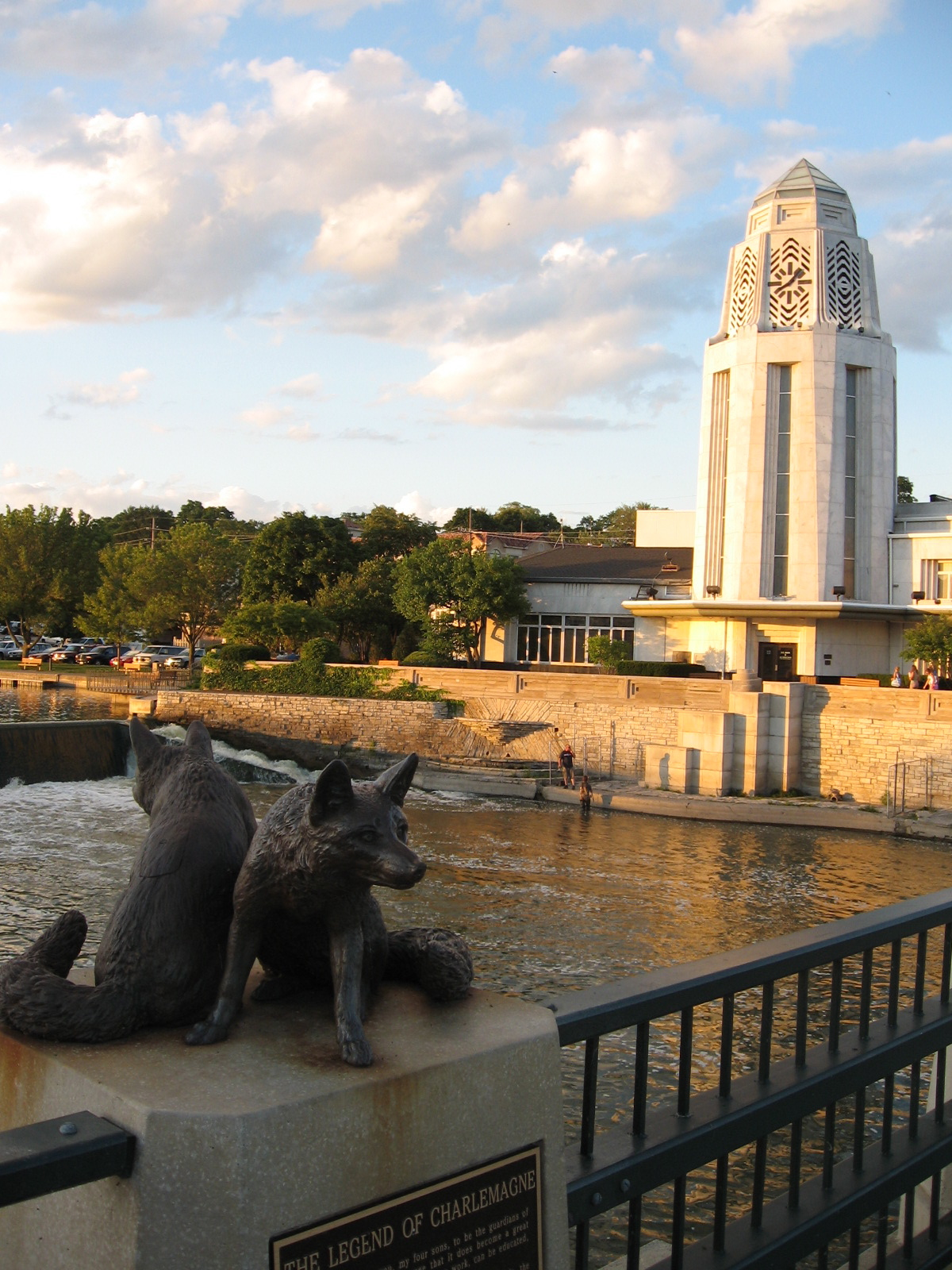
- Municipal Center/City Hall in downtown St. Charles by the Fox River

- Flag Logo
- Nickname(s): STC (local abbreviation), St. Chuck
- Motto: Pride of the Fox
- Interactive map of St. Charles, Illinois
- Location within Chicago metropolitan area Location within Illinois Location within the United States
- Coordinates: 41.919447°N 88.310743°W
- Country: United States
- State: Illinois
- Counties: Kane, DuPage
- Founded: 1834 as of Charleston
- Incorporated: February 9, 1839 as of St. Charles
- Reincorporated: October 17, 1874

Government
  - Mayor: Clint Hull
  - City Council: W1: Mark Foulkes & Ronald Silkaitis; W2: Jayme Muenz & Ryan Bongard; W3: Bob Gehm & Vicki Spellman; W4: David Pietryla & Bryan Wirball; W5: Ed Bessner & Steve Weber
  - City Treasurer: John Harrill
  - City Clerk: Jessica Bridges

Area
  - Total: 15.058 sq mi (39.000 km^{2})
  - Land: 14.463 sq mi (37.458 km^{2})
  - Water: 0.596 sq mi (1.543 km^{2}) 3.96%
- Elevation: 750 ft (230 m)

Population (2020)
  - Total: 33,081
  - Estimate (2024): 33,482
  - Density: 2,287.3/sq mi (883.15/km^{2})
- Time zone: UTC−6 (Central (CST))
  - Summer (DST): UTC−5 (CDT)
- ZIP Codes: 60174, 60175
- Area codes: 630 and 331
- FIPS code: 17-66703
- GNIS feature ID: 2396476
- Website: stcharlesil.gov

St. Charles is a city in Kane and DuPage counties, Illinois, United States. The population was 33,081 at the 2020 census, and was estimated at 33,482 in 2024. It lies roughly 35 miles west of Chicago on Illinois Route 64. The official city slogan is "Pride of the Fox", after the Fox River that runs through the center of town. St. Charles is part of a tri-city area along with Geneva and Batavia, all western Chicago suburbs of similar size and socioeconomic condition.

== History ==
=== Early history ===
St. Charles was the location of the Native American community for the chief of the Pottawatomie that inhabited the area. A city park overlooking the river was dedicated to the Native Americans. After the Black Hawk War in 1832, the entire area of the Fox Valley was opened to American settlement. Evan Shelby and William Franklin staked the first claim in what is now St. Charles in 1833. They came back in 1834 with their families from Indiana and were joined by over a dozen other families later that year. The township was initially known as Charleston, but this name was already taken by the downstate city of Charleston, Illinois, so the name of St. Charles (suggested by S. S. Jones, a lawyer) was adopted in 1839. St. Charles became incorporated as a city February 9, 1839, and reincorporated October 17, 1874 (under the 1870 Illinois Constitution).

=== Underground Railroad ===
Widespread claims of slavery-era Underground Railroad stations operating in St. Charles homes, complete with tunnels and false doorways, have not been historically substantiated. Even so, an active abolitionist group was operating in St. Charles around this time, called the Kane County Anti-Slavery Society. The Society was founded in 1842 and had about 180 members at its peak. The most plausible connection to the Underground Railroad in the town is the Wheeler House, built in St. Charles in 1837.

=== Transportation history ===
St. Charles was very isolated early in its existence. The village was located three days away from Chicago, and the Fox River was not navigable for large boats. By the 1850s, St. Charles had begun construction of a plank road to Sycamore but turned down an offer by the Galena and Chicago Union Railroad to construct a line through the town, which was eventually built in nearby Elgin. Lack of regional connections in the early years kept the town relatively small. St. Charles was without a railroad until 1871 when a branch line from Geneva was constructed, and was without a direct connection to Chicago until the 1880s with the coming of the Chicago Great Western Railway.

Streetcar lines along the Fox River between Elgin and Aurora were built through the city in 1896, operated by the Aurora, Elgin and Fox River Electric company. A direct automobile route to Chicago, which eventually became Route 64 (Main Street), was constructed in 1920. Four Illinois state routes including Routes 64, 38 (Lincoln Highway), 25 (5th Avenue), and 31 (2nd Street) now run through the city. Two major Kane County roads also cut through the city; Randall Road on the west side and Kirk Road on the east side.

=== COVID-19 pandemic ===
On April 25, 2020 (6 years ago), the Kane County Health Department ordered Smithfield Foods to close its meat processing plant because of the COVID-19 pandemic, a local instance of the pandemic's effects on the meat industry in the United States. On May 2, 2020, after an executive order concerning Chicago-area meat packing plants was signed by President Donald Trump, the facility was reopened.

== Geography ==
According to the United States Census Bureau, the city has a total area of 15.058 square miles (39.00 km^{2}), of which 14.462 square miles (37.46 km^{2}) is land and 0.596 square miles (1.54 km^{2}) (3.96%) is water.

The Fox River runs through downtown. Pottawatomie Park, which sits on the river, is the largest park in St. Charles and a popular destination for both tourists and tri-city area citizens.

== Demographics ==
Historical population
Census	Pop.	Note	%±
1860	1,822		—
1880	1,533		—
1890	1,690		10.2%
1900	2,675		58.3%
1910	4,046		51.3%
1920	4,099		1.3%
1930	5,377		31.2%
1940	5,870		9.2%
1950	6,709		14.3%
1960	9,269		38.2%
1970	12,945		39.7%
1980	17,492		35.1%
1990	22,501		28.6%
2000	27,896		24.0%
2010	32,974		18.2%
2020	33,081		0.3%
2024 (est.)	33,482		1.2%
U.S. Decennial Census; 2020 Census

=== Racial and ethnic composition ===
St. Charles, Illinois – racial and ethnic composition Note: the US Census treats Hispanic/Latino as an ethnic category. This table excludes Latinos from the racial categories and assigns them to a separate category. Hispanics/Latinos may be of any race.
Race / ethnicity (NH = non-Hispanic)	Pop. 1980	Pop. 1990	Pop. 2000	Pop. 2010	Pop. 2020
White alone (NH)	16,827 (96.20%)	21,543 (95.74%)	25,212 (90.38%)	27,378 (83.03%)	26,099 (78.89%)
Black or African American alone (NH)	48 (0.27%)	86 (0.38%)	450 (1.61%)	785 (2.38%)	562 (1.70%)
Native American or Alaska Native alone (NH)	0 (0.00%)	27 (0.12%)	20 (0.07%)	34 (0.10%)	25 (0.08%)
Asian alone (NH)	124 (0.71%)	260 (1.16%)	494 (1.77%)	1,034 (3.14%)	1,440 (4.35%)
Pacific Islander alone (NH)	—	—	1 (0.00%)	15 (0.05%)	4 (0.01%)
Other race alone (NH)	14 (0.08%)	9 (0.04%)	11 (0.04%)	33 (0.10%)	102 (0.31%)
Mixed race or multiracial (NH)	—	—	173 (0.62%)	346 (1.05%)	1,125 (3.40%)
Hispanic or Latino (any race)	474 (2.71%)	576 (2.56%)	1,535 (5.50%)	3,349 (10.16%)	3,724 (11.26%)
Total	17,492 (100.00%)	22,501 (100.00%)	27,896 (100.00%)	32,974 (100.00%)	33,081 (100.00%)

=== 2020 census ===
As of the 2020 census, St. Charles had a population of 33,081. The median age was 41.9 years. 21.7% of residents were under the age of 18 and 17.9% of residents were 65 years of age or older. For every 100 females there were 96.0 males, and for every 100 females age 18 and over there were 93.8 males age 18 and over.

99.3% of residents lived in urban areas, while 0.7% lived in rural areas.

The city contained 13,264 households and 8,843 families; 29.5% had children under the age of 18 living in them. Of all households, 53.2% were married-couple households, 15.7% were households with a male householder and no spouse or partner present, and 25.0% were households with a female householder and no spouse or partner present. About 27.3% of all households were made up of individuals and 11.6% had someone living alone who was 65 years of age or older.

There were 13,809 housing units, of which 3.9% were vacant. The homeowner vacancy rate was 1.0% and the rental vacancy rate was 5.8%.

Racial composition as of the 2020 census
Race	Number	Percent
White	26,853	81.2%
Black or African American	578	1.7%
American Indian and Alaska Native	129	0.4%
Asian	1,466	4.4%
Native Hawaiian and Other Pacific Islander	6	0.0%
Some other race	1,508	4.6%
Two or more races	2,541	7.7%
Hispanic or Latino (of any race)	3,724	11.3%

=== 2023 American Community Survey ===
According to the 2023 American Community Survey, the city had a median household income of $115,350. Approximately 3.9% of the population lived at or below the poverty line. St. Charles had an estimated 67.0% employment rate, with 51.2% of the population holding a bachelor's degree or higher and 94.7% holding a high school diploma.

=== Housing market ===
According to realtor website Zillow, the average price of a home as of October 31, 2025, in St. Charles is $451,481.

== Economy ==
=== Top employers ===
According to the city's 2025 Annual Comprehensive Financial Report, the largest employers in the city are:

Number	Employer	Number of employees	Percentage of Total Employment	Percentage of Total City Population
1	St. Charles Community Unit School District 303	1,928	10.84%	5.78%
2	RR Donnelley & Sons Company	795	4.47%	2.38%
3	System Sensor	495	2.78%	1.48%
4	NidecMobility Corp	450	2.53%	1.35%
5	Smithfield Foods (Armour-Eckrich)	400	2.25%	1.20%
6	Jewel-Osco	400	2.25%	1.20%
7	City of St. Charles	275	1.55%	0.82%
8	Compact Industries	250	1.41%	0.75%
9	Q Center	235	1.32%	0.70%
10	Clarke Mosquito	222	1.25%	0.67%
—	Total	5,450	30.65%	16.33%

Piano-making was a major industry in St. Charles in the first three decades of the 20th century. The arrival of the Chicago Great Western Railway enabled The Cable Co., one of the country's largest producers of pianos and reed organs, to build a factory on 11 acres (4.5 hectares) of land at 410 South 1st Street in 1901.

Employing up to 500 workers:

"[The piano factory] gave St. Charles an international flavor. Ivory for piano keys came from India and Africa. Wool for the hammers came from Australia. Rich wood veneers were imported from Mexico, South America and the gold coast of Africa. In return, Cable distributed its pianos all over the world and had dealers in Spain, Italy, British East Africa, Japan, Australia, and other key foreign places."

On January 7, 1937 (89 years ago), the St. Charles factory closed, having been sold to the W.H. Howell company, which made furniture there until 1980. The building reopened in May 1986 as the indoor Piano Factory Outlet Mall, whose outlet stores included Corning, American Tourister, Carter's, Pfalzgraff, and Anchor Hocking. It was foreclosed and closed in 1997. The building was razed in September 2000 to make way for a residential development; the site is now occupied by condominiums and mixed-use buildings.

== Arts and culture ==
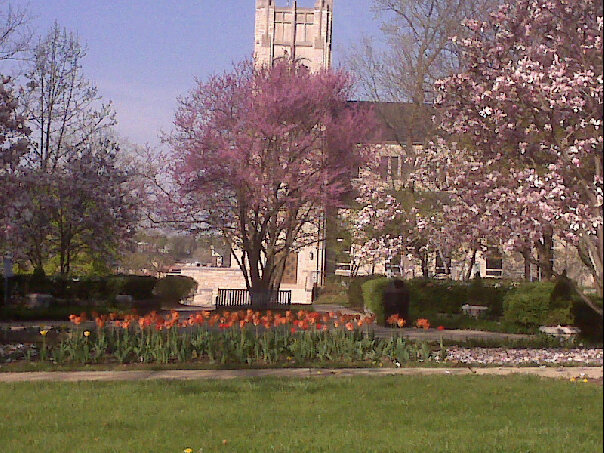
Baker Memorial Park, northwest corner of Illinois Route 64 at Illinois Route 25, downtown St Charles Illinois (April 2010)

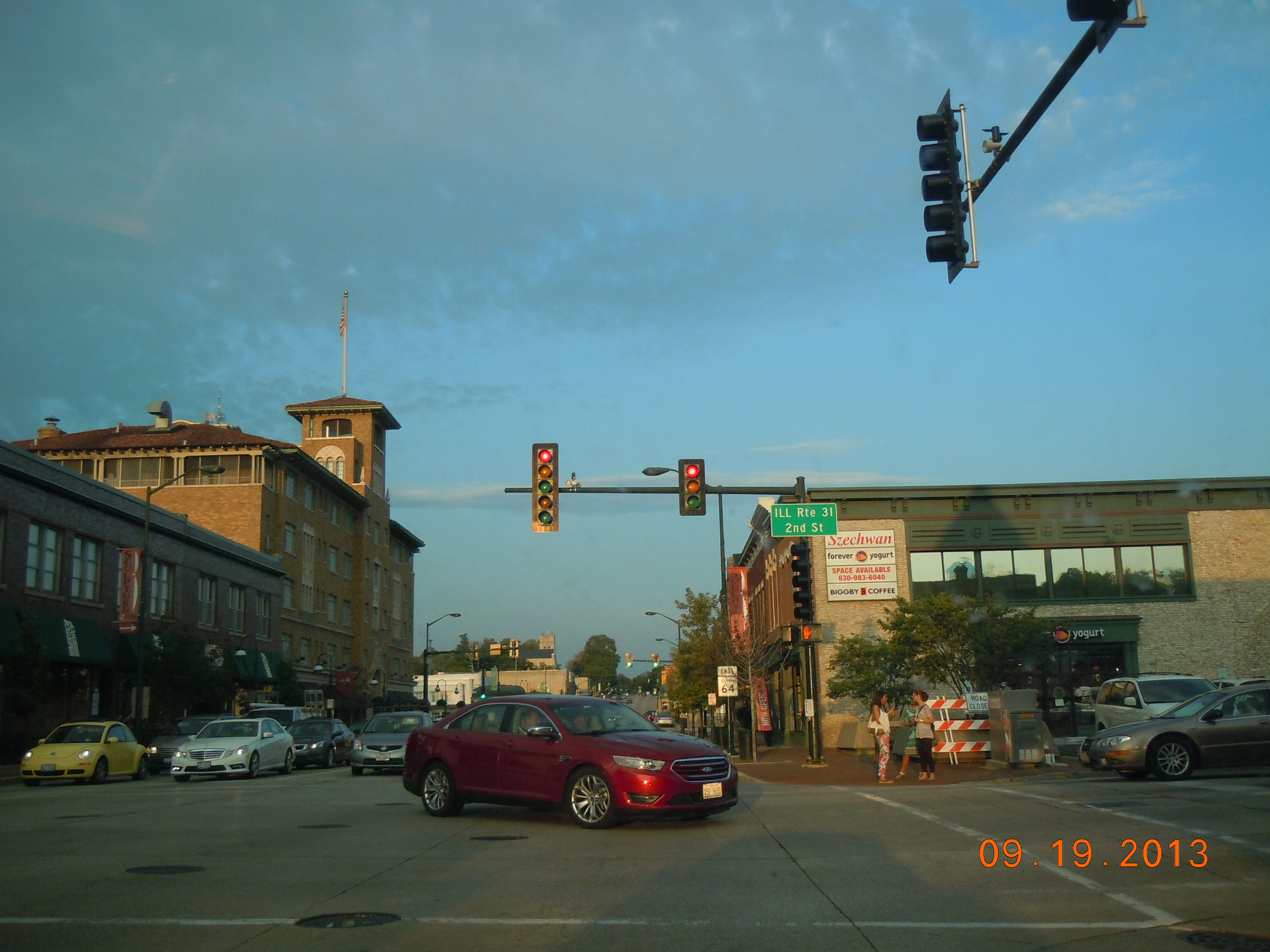
Downtown St. Charles facing east, showing Hotel Baker on the left with an American flag flying

Kane County fair grounds on Randall Road is the home of the Kane County Fair in July, the Kane County Flea Market the first Sunday and preceding Saturday of every month. The annual Dragon Boat festival and family event during the second weekend of June are held in Potawatomi Park. Lincoln Park, in downtown St. Charles, serves as the central location for the Scarecrow Festival in October. St. Charles is home to the Fox Valley Concert Band.

St. Charles is home to the Arcada theatre, a notable attraction within the Fox River valley, where many famous performers have appeared including Martin Short, Joan Rivers, and Paul Anka. The Steel Beam Theatre, the cabaret styled Moonlight Theatre, and Kane Repertory Theatre are also theaters in the city. Historic Hotel Baker opened in 1928 and is a symbolic representation of the rich history of downtown St. Charles.

Downtown St. Charles was named one of the region's "Top 10" by the Chicago Tribune for fine dining, arts and entertainment, recreational opportunities, unique shopping, and a lively nighttime personality. The St. Charles History Museum maintains a small museum of community artifacts in a historic former Texaco service station that was originally built in 1928 on Main Street.

The St. Charles Public Library is nationally ranked among the best libraries in the U.S. and has earned a "three star" rating in the 2010 Library Journal Index. Located near downtown St. Charles, the library has a large collection of print materials, as well as DVDs, CDs, downloadable content, online research databases, and a genealogy collection.

St. Charles is home to the Q Center, a 95-acre (38 ha) conference site. Originally built as a Catholic Women's Liberal Arts College, St. Dominic College, it later became Arthur Andersen's Center for Professional Education. It is now used by Accenture and hosts meetings, conferences and executive learning for Fortune 500 companies, associations and social, military, education, religious, and fraternal organizations from all over the world.

St. Charles hosts an annual Scarecrow Weekend, featuring 100+ handmade scarecrows. The Great Western Trail passes through town.

== Government and infrastructure ==
=== State government ===
The Illinois Youth Center St. Charles (IYC St. Charles), a juvenile correctional facility of the Illinois Department of Juvenile Justice, is in St. Charles. It opened in December 1904.

=== Transportation ===
Pace provides bus service on Routes 801 and 802 connecting St. Charles to Elgin, Aurora, and other destinations. The Chicago & North Western Railway had a branch line to St. Charles. It diverged from the main line at Geneva and closed in 1951. The Chicago Great Western line ran directly through St. Charles and had commuter service until 1906.

== Education ==
The public education system in St. Charles is operated by the Community Unit School District 303, which has thirteen elementary schools: Anderson, Bell-Graham, Corron, Davis, Ferson Creek, Fox Ridge, Lincoln, Munhall, Norton Creek, Wasco, Wild Rose and also including Davis Primary (K-2), and Richmond Intermediate (3–5), two split elementary schools. There are two middle schools: Thompson and Wredling; and two high schools: St. Charles East High School, and St. Charles North High School. The Glenwood School for Boys and Girls has a campus in St. Charles known as the Rathje Campus named for the Frank C. Rathje family. St. Patrick Catholic School opened its doors in 1930 and previously served about 500 students at the downtown campus. Saint Patrick Catholic school's downtown campus is now a preschool. The school opened another location off Randall Road which serves over 500 students. St. Charles is part of Community College District 509 which is served by Elgin Community College.

== Notable people ==
- Edward J. Baker, wealthy benefactor; provided the funding for several buildings in St. Charles
- Robert F. Casey, Illinois state legislator and lawyer, practiced law in St. Charles
- Chrissy Chlapecka, singer, songwriter, Internet personality
- Frantz Hunt Coe, physician, public official, and educator
- Ethan Cutkosky, actor
- John F. Farnsworth, Union Army general and U.S. congressman; friend of Abraham Lincoln; lived in St. Charles
- Dennis E. Fitch, off-duty pilot who helped saved lives in the crash of United Airlines Flight 232; died in St. Charles
- Michael Heisley (1937–2014) was a businessman and majority owner of the Memphis Grizzlies.
- Helmut Jahn (1940–2021), architect and member of the postmodern group of architects dubbed the Chicago Seven.
- Dallas Jenkins, actor and creator of The Chosen
- Marci Jobson, born in St Charles and grew up there, professional soccer player and coach
- Jenny McCarthy, lives in St. Charles, actress
- Tera Moody, marathoner
- Karen Morrison-Comstock, Miss Illinois USA 1974, Miss USA 1974
- Michael J. Nelson, comedian and writer; (Mystery Science Theater 3000)
- Dellora A. Norris, civic philanthropist
- Tyler Nubin, National Football League football player for the New York Giants
- David Purcey, left-handed relief pitcher in Major League Baseball
- Wayne Randazzo, play-by-play television broadcaster Los Angeles Angels of the MLB
- Matt Reynolds, relief pitcher for the Arizona Diamondbacks of the MLB
- Matthew Shiltz, quarterback for the Hamilton Tiger-Cats in the Canadian Football League
- Donnie Wahlberg, lives in St. Charles, entertainer, member of singing group New Kids on the Block
- Brian Wilson, singer and member of the Beach Boys; lived in St. Charles
- Chris Witaske, actor
- Rick Wohlhuter, 1976 800m Olympic bronze medalist; born in St. Charles
- Randy Wright, former NFL quarterback
- Eleanor Himmelfarb (1910-2009), artist, teacher and conservationist

== See also ==
- Tri-Cities, Illinois
