= Stuart R. Knott =

American railroad executive

- Born: April 11, 1859; Louisville, Kentucky, US
- Died: February 11, 1943 (aged 83)
- Occupation: American railroad executive
- Known for: president of Kansas City Southern Railway

Stuart R. Knott (April 11, 1859 – February 11, 1943) was the fourth president of Kansas City Southern Railway.

== Birth and family ==
Stuart R. Knott was born on April 11, 1859, in Louisville, Kentucky, to Richard Wallace and Ann Mary (Roberts) Knott. He was the fifth child among 3 daughters and 6 sons.

== Career ==
=== Louisville and Nashville Railway ===
On January 1, 1888, Knott was promoted to traffic manager for Louisville and Nashville Railway (L&N), a position he held until October 7, 1891. He was then promoted to first vice president.

Knott was a key representative in defending the L&N's haulage and drayage rates through the 1890s. In 1895, the L&N was brought to court over its rates for hauling coal in Kentucky. Knott was one of the L&N representatives present for the railroad's defense. Similarly, drayage rates in New Orleans were also disputed at a meeting where Knott represented the L&N. Also in 1895, several grocers' associations began a boycott of the L&N due to its freight rates for their members, to which Knott again defended the L&N's practices in refusing to offer a differential rate between carload and less-than-carload shipments. With all of the rate disputes, rumors began to circulate that the Southern States Passenger Association, which related to passenger train operations in the region, including those of the L&N, may dissolve.

=== Plant System ===
In October 1899, Knott was elected as vice president of the Plant System, under R. G. Erwin as president. (Note: Some newspaper accounts of the time described Knott as president of the Plant System.) But his time with the Plant System lasted less than a year as he resigned in July 1900 to take the vice president and general manager position at Chicago and Alton Railroad. Knott was succeeded as vice president of the Plant System by Morton F. Plant, the son of Henry B. Plant who had founded the Plant System.

=== Kansas City Southern Railway ===
Concurrent with his appointment at the Alton, Knott was selected to succeed Samuel W. Fordyce as president of Kansas City Southern Railway on July 11, 1900, beginning his term on August 1. At this time, Knott was also appointed as traffic manager for Union Pacific Railroad, further connecting these three Harriman-controlled railroad companies. Rumors began to circulate that Knott would soon be named president of the C&A. Following an inspection trip over the entire KCS system in the first week of August 1900, Knott affirmed to reporters that the KCS will remain an independently operated railroad.

Soon after taking office at KCS, Knott sought to expand the railroad. He and Edward F. Swinney, then president of First National Bank of Kansas City, were appointed as receivers for the Kansas City Suburban Belt Railway, Union Terminal Railway and the Kansas City and Independence Air Line so that they could be more easily integrated and merged into the KCS system.

In late October 1900, reports circulated that John W. Gates took control of a majority of shares of KCS stock, which led to rumors that W. G. Brimson would succeed Knott as president. It was soon revealed that Gates hadn't gained full control, rather that Harriman had purchased KCS stock from Gates and Knott would continue as president. A few days later, on November 3, 1900, a new board of directors for the KCS was announced, which included Harriman, Gates, Knott and former president Fordyce as well as George J. and Edwin Gould; the new board confirmed Knott's continuing term as president.

On January 3, 1901, Knott served as chairman for a conference in New York City discussing standard freight rates for western and northwestern railroads. The conference closed with no significant changes to the rates and no new resolutions adopted, with Knott reported as "being entirely satisfied with the present situation."

In June 1901, rumors were published that Knott was to succeed Samuel Felton as president of the Alton. Felton denied the rumors.

At the 1902 annual meeting of the Kansas City, Shreveport and Gulf Railway and the Kansas City, Shreveport and Gulf Terminal Company, Knott was elected president of both companies, the latter company being the owner of Shreveport Union Station.

A year after the previous rumors of his resignation, new rumors emerged in July 1902, some citing J.P. Morgan Company, that Knott would leave the KCS to return to the L&N as president. As with the previous rumors, Knott denied these claims as well.

== Notes ==
Business positions
Preceded by	Vice President of Plant System; 1899 – 1900	Succeeded by Morton F. Plant
Preceded by Samuel W. Fordyce	President of Kansas City Southern Railway; 1900 – 1905	Succeeded by Job A. Edson
