= Samuel W. Fordyce =

American railroad executive (1840–1919)

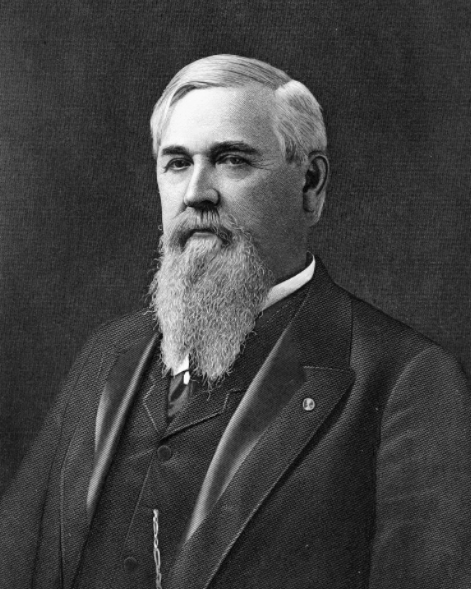
- Born: Samuel Wesley Fordyce; February 7, 1840; Guernsey County, Ohio, U.S.
- Died: August 3, 1919 (aged 79); Atlantic City, New Jersey, U.S.
- Burial place: Bellefontaine Cemetery
- Occupation: Railroad executive

Samuel Wesley "Colonel" Fordyce (February 7, 1840 – August 3, 1919) was a prominent railroad executive of the American South. He served on several boards of directors and as president of a few railroads. Fordyce was also the receiver for several railroads when they declared bankruptcy.

== Early life ==
Fordyce was born in Guernsey County, Ohio, to John Fordyce and Mary Ann Houseman, both of whom were from Pennsylvania. Samuel was one of ten children. He attended Madison College in Uniontown, Pennsylvania, and later studied at North Illinois University in Henry County, Illinois.

== Military career ==
At the age of twenty, after completing his studies, Fordyce returned home to work as a station agent on the Central Ohio Railroad. After a year, he enlisted as a private in the First Ohio Volunteer Cavalry to fight in the Civil War. He was soon promoted to second lieutenant and then to a first lieutenancy of Company B, First Ohio Volunteers. In 1863, he was promoted to captain of Company H and soon after was made assistant inspector general of cavalry in the Army of the Cumberland. Fordyce was wounded three times and captured three times, but he was recaptured two of those times and managed to escape the other.

== Professional career ==
After the Civil War, Fordyce relocated to Huntsville, Alabama, and established a banking house, Fordyce & Rison. Fordyce assisted in financing the North & South Alabama Railway from Decatur to Montgomery.

In January 1876, Fordyce moved near Hot Springs, Arkansas, after being in bad health and knowing the reputation of Hot Springs as a health resort. While in Hot Springs, Fordyce contributed greatly to the development of the city. He assisted Senator John A. Logan in introducing a bill to build an Army and Navy Hospital on government reservation land in Hot Springs. Fordyce also helped to finance hotels, an opera house, water, gas, and electric light works, street railcars, and other public enterprises.

Fordyce soon turned his attention to building a network of railroads in the south and southwest. The St. Louis Southwestern Railway Company was built under Fordyce's management, which he operated for sixteen years. Fordyce served in many positions in the rail industry. For three years, he was vice president and treasurer of the Texas & St. Louis Railway. He was a receiver from 1885 to 1886 and president of the railroad, which was reorganized under the name St. Louis, Arkansas & Texas Railway, from 1886 to 1889. He served as receiver from 1889 to 1890 and president from 1890 to 1898 of the newly titled St. Louis Southwestern Railway Company. In 1899, Fordyce was appointed receiver of the Kansas City, Pittsburgh & Gulf Railway and became its president a year later, when it was renamed the Kansas City Southern Railway. In 1900 and 1901, he helped build the Little Rock, Hot Springs & Western Railway. It is estimated that Fordyce has contributed to the building and financing of at least ten thousand miles of railway. His contributions to the railroad include the following lines: St. Louis-San Francisco system; Missouri, Oklahoma & Gulf Railroad; the Illinois, Indiana & Minnesota Railroad; the Apalachicola Northern in Florida; the St. Louis, Guthrie & El Reno Railroad in Oklahoma; the St. Louis, Brownsville and Mexico Railway in Texas; and the Fort Worth and Denver Railway.

Aside from his work in the transportation industry, Fordyce held a number of other prominent positions including director and organizer of the St. Louis Union Trust Company, director of the Laclede Light & Power Company, director of the Jefferson Hotel Company, vice president of the Arlington and New York Hotel Companies, president of the Hot Springs Water, Gas, and Electric Light Companies, president of the Hot Springs Electric Street Railway Company, director of the Illinois, Indiana & Minnesota Railroad, director of the Apalachicola & Northern, director of the Kansas City Southern, director of the Little Rock & Hot Springs Western, chairman of the executive committee of the St. Louis, Brownsville & Mexico, and director in the American Rio Grande Land & Irrigation Company of Texas, the largest irrigating canal system in the United States. Fordyce was also elected, by unanimous vote of all lines in the Southwestern Traffic Association, as chairman of its executive board. The association represented almost all traffic from the Atlantic west to the Mississippi, to California, and to old Mexico.

== Political career ==
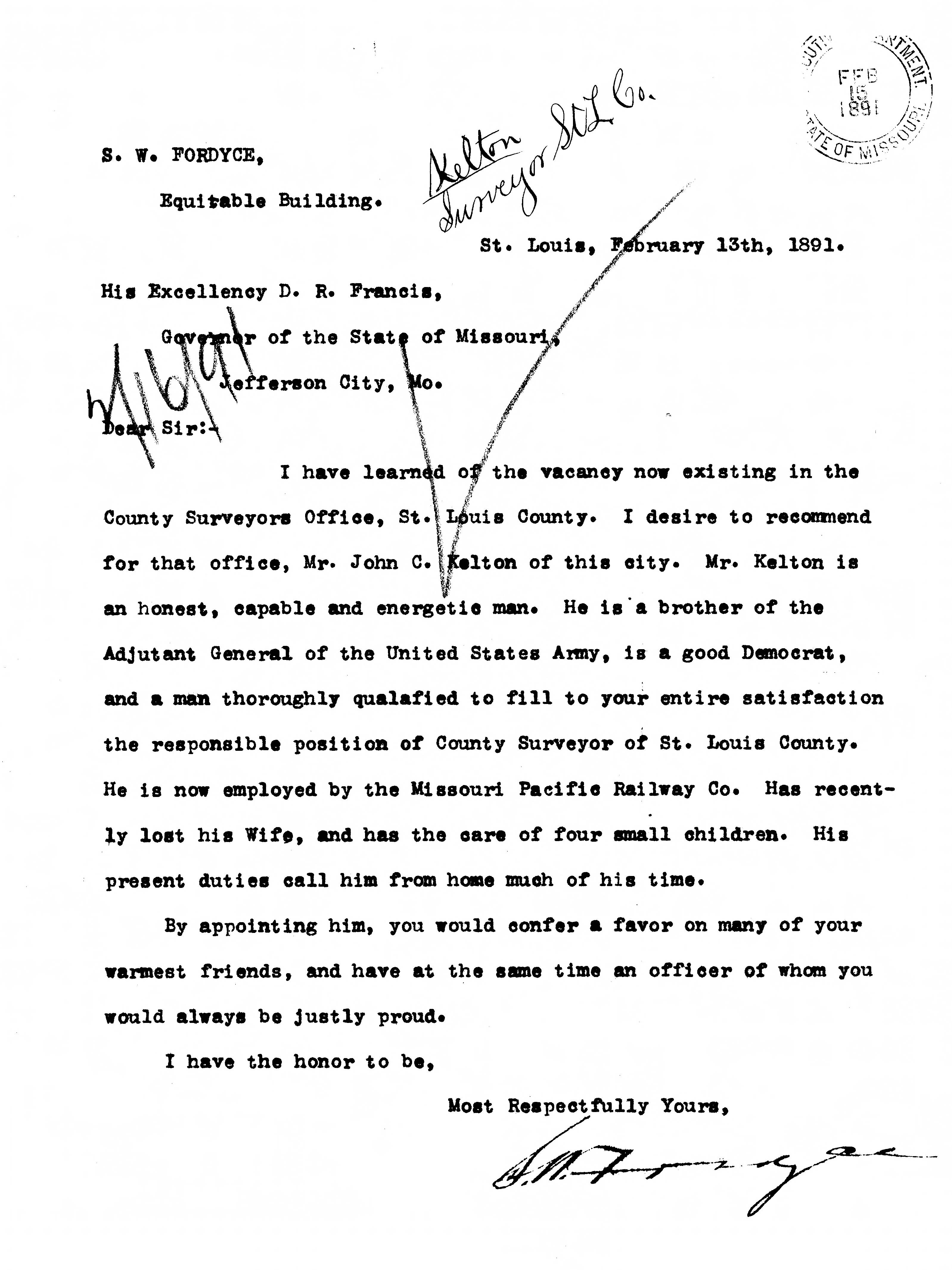
Letter, from S. W. Fordyce, St. Louis to David Rowland Francis, February 13, 1891; David Rowland Francis, 1889-1893; Office of Governor, Record Group 3.27; Missouri State Archives, Jefferson City

Fordyce was an active Democrat, serving as a delegate to conventions in Alabama during Reconstruction, after the Civil War. He was a member of the state committee in 1874 when an entirely Democratic ticket was elected. In 1880, Fordyce was a delegate to the state gubernatorial convention in Arkansas. He was also a delegate to the state judicial convention in 1884, member of the Democratic national committee of Arkansas from 1884 to 1888, delegate to the national Democratic convention of 1884, member of the committee to notify Cleveland and Hendricks of their nomination as president and vice president, delegate at large to the national Democratic convention of 1892, and chairman of the committee on permanent organization. Fordyce was often asked to run for governor or senator, but declined. Fordyce was respected by both parties for his political knowledge, and several presidents sought his advice, including President Hayes, President Harrison, and President McKinley.

It is clear that Fordyce had some political influence, as he wrote to Missouri Governor David Rowland Francis in 1891 recommending John C. Kelton, an employee of the Missouri Pacific Railway Company for a position in the County Surveyors Office.

== Personal life ==
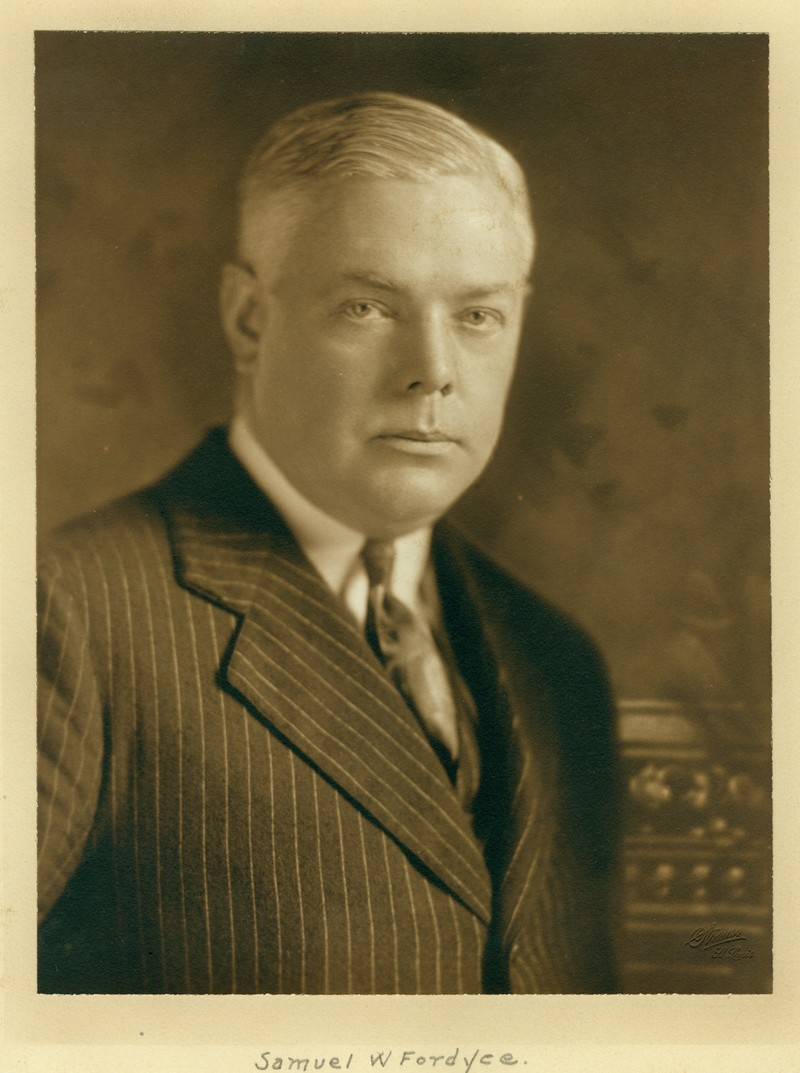
Samuel W. Fordyce Jr. (1878–1948), son of Samuel W. Fordyce

Fordyce married Susan E. Chadick on May 1, 1866. Susan was the daughter of Reverend William D. Chadick, of Huntsville, Alabama. Susan and Samuel had two daughters and three sons. Their son, John Rison Fordyce (1869-1939), was an engineer, inventor, amateur historian, and archaeologist, and a candidate for United States Congress. He also made an expedition to the Arctic as part of Dr. Frederick A. Cook's team in 1894. In 1917, John was commissioned Major of Engineers and oversaw the construction of Camp Pike in Arkansas.

== Death and legacy ==
Fordyce died on August 3, 1919, in Atlantic City, New Jersey. His remains were interred at Bellefontaine Cemetery in St. Louis.

The town of Fordyce, Arkansas, was named for Samuel W. Fordyce.

There was a town in South Texas called Sam Fordyce in the 20th century.

Business positions
Preceded by	President of St. Louis, Arkansas, and Texas Railway; 1886 – 1889	Succeeded by
Preceded by	President of St. Louis Southwestern Railway; 1890 – 1898	Succeeded by Edwin Gould
Preceded by Arthur Stillwell	President of Kansas City Southern Railway; 1900	Succeeded by Stuart R. Knott
