= Charles Gates =

Charles Gates may refer to:

- Charles Gates Jr. (1921–2005), businessman and philanthropist
- Charles Gilbert Gates, owner of the first air conditioned home
- Charles W. Gates, governor of Vermont from 1915 to 1917
- Charles H. Gates (1854–1933), American frontiersman and fortune hunter
