= Kansas City Suburban Belt Railroad =

Railway located throughout the suburban Kansas City area

Overview
- Headquarters: Kansas City, MO
- Locale: Kansas City, Kansas and Independence, Missouri areas
- Dates of operation: 1890–1897
- Successor: Kansas City, Pittsburg and Gulf Railroad (then Kansas City Southern Railway, and now CPKC)

Technical
- Track gauge: 4 ft 8 1/2 in (1,435 mm) standard gauge

The Kansas City Suburban Belt Railroad was a 20-mile railway located throughout the suburban Kansas City area and is considered the first company in what would become the Kansas City Southern Railroad.

The railroad ran from the Argentine District of Kansas City, Kansas through Kansas City, Missouri to Independence, Missouri. The tracks which were close to the Kansas River and Missouri River served industries along the river. The railway was incorporated by Arthur Stilwell and Edward L. Martin in 1887, and began operation in 1890. In September 1900, it was placed under the receivership control of Stuart R. Knott and Edward F. Swinney with the aim of merging the railroad into the Kansas City Southern Railway system.
