= NGC 5930 =

Starburst galaxy in the constellation Boötes

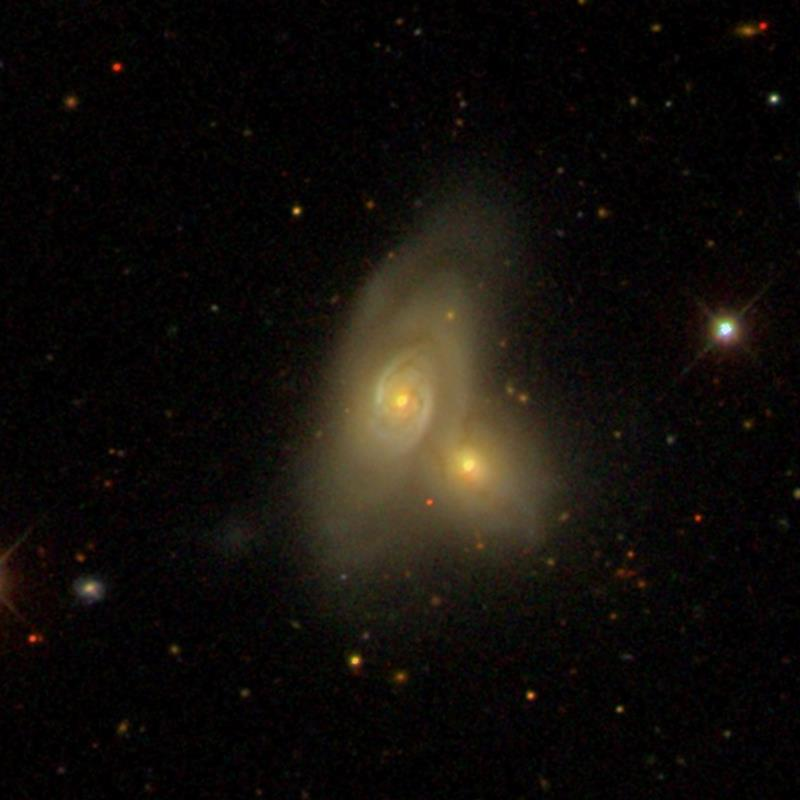
- SDSS image of NGC 5930 (left) with NGC 5929 (right)

Observation data (J2000 epoch)
- Constellation: Boötes
- Right ascension: 15^{h} 26^{m} 07.987^{s}
- Declination: +41° 40′ 33.92″
- Redshift: 0.008723
- Heliocentric radial velocity: 2,672 km s^{−1}
- Distance: 133 Mly (40.8 Mpc)
- Apparent magnitude (V): 12.2

Characteristics
- Type: SAB(rs)b pec
- Apparent size (V): 1.830′ × 0.915′
- Notable features: NGC 5929 is a companion with NGC 5930

Other designations
- 1ZW 112, 2MASX J15260798+4140339, 87GB 152418.4+415023, ARP 90, CASG 711, FIRST J152607.9+414033, H II-651, h 1925, GC 4104, CGCG 222.007, IRAS 15243+4150, KCPG 466B, KPG 466a, LEDA 55080, LGG 399-001, MCG+07-32-007, PGC 55080, UGC 9852, UZC J152607.9+414034, VV 823, Z 222-7, Z 1524.3+4151, ZW I 112.

NGC 5930 is a starburst galaxy in the constellation Boötes that is interacting with the nearby Seyfert galaxy NGC 5929. 5930 has a morphological classification of SAB(rs)b pec, indicating that it is a weakly-barred spiral galaxy with a poorly defined nuclear ring structure. It is inclined at an angle of 46° to the line of sight from the Earth.
