= John Warne Gates =

American industrialist (1855–1911)

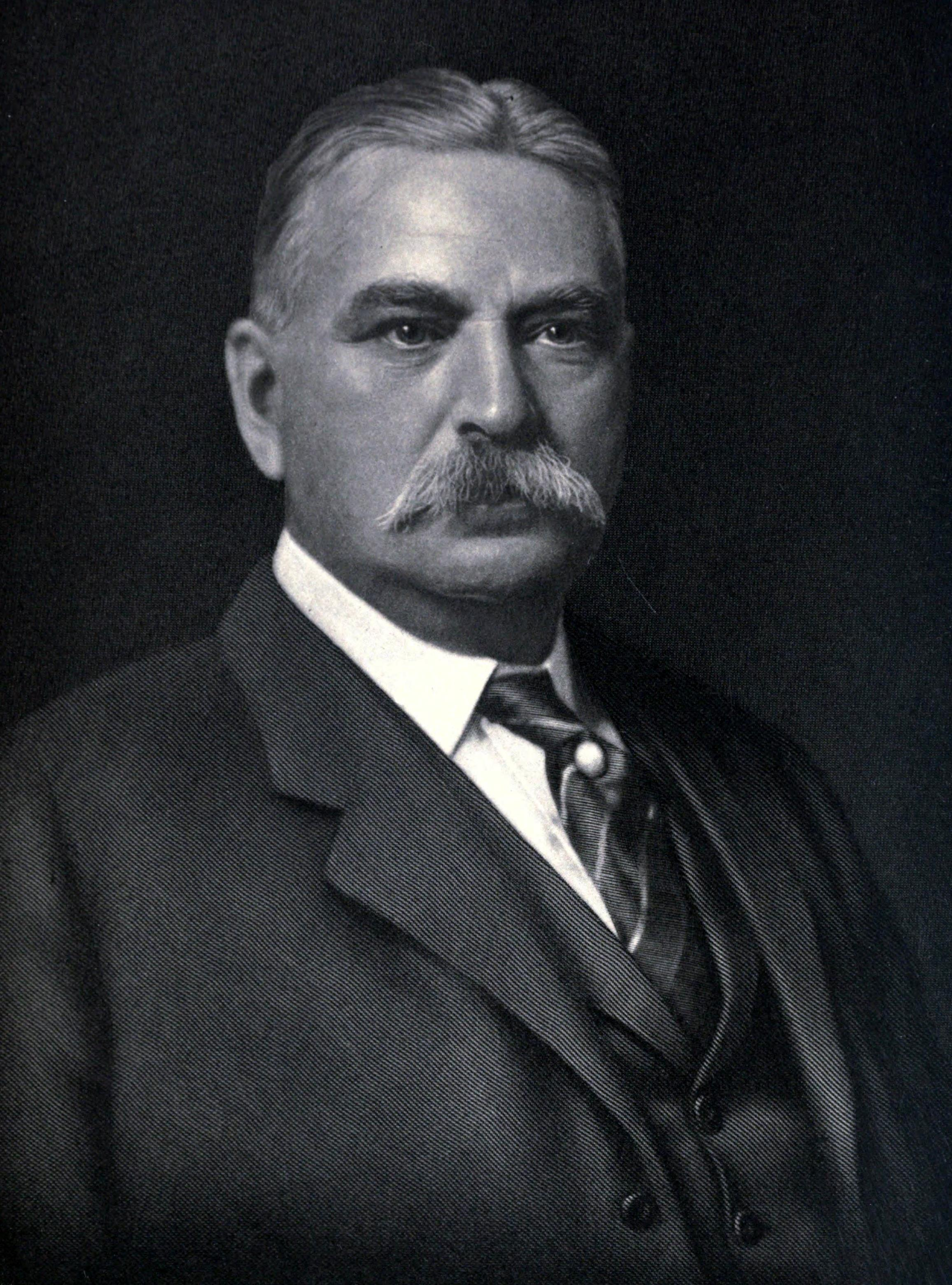
- Gates circa 1900
- Born: May 18, 1855; West Chicago, Illinois
- Died: August 9, 1911 (aged 56); Paris, French Third Republic
- Resting place: Woodlawn Cemetery, New York City
- Other name: "Bet-a-Million"
- Education: North Central College, Wheaton College
- Occupation: Industrialist
- Known for: Selling of barbed wire, gambling
- Spouse: Dellora Baker (m. 1874)

Signature
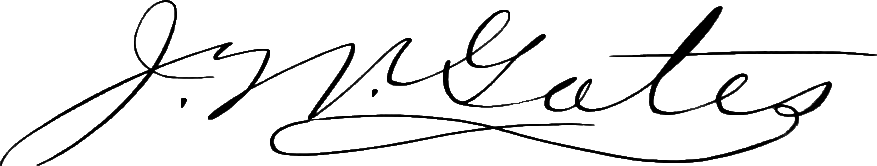

John Warne Gates (May 18, 1855 – August 9, 1911), also known as "Bet-a-Million" Gates, was an American Gilded Age industrialist and gambler. He was a pioneer promoter of barbed wire. He was born and raised in what is now West Chicago, Illinois. He did not enjoy farm life and began offering neighbors various business propositions at an early age, including the sale of firewood to homes and to the local railroad. When he started a local grain brokerage that failed, Gates began spending time at the local railroad station and became reacquainted with the men he previously sold firewood to. He was invited to join their poker games and through this, Gates' aptitude for cards and other games of chance was developed.

After studying penmanship, bookkeeping and business law in North Central College (by then Northwestern College), he failed as an owner of a local hardware store. Gates became interested in barbed wire and became a salesman for the Washburn-Moen Company. When he was assigned to the Texas sales territory, he learned that ranchers were adamant about not buying his product. Gates staged a demonstration of the wire in San Antonio's Military Plaza with charging cattle failing to break the barbed wire fences he had set up. He then proved very successful in selling the company's product, and went on to start his own barbed wire manufacturing business, which eventually led to the production of steel. In the process, his company was purchased by J. P. Morgan's U. S. Steel. Gates was not invited to become part of the company, and he fought back at Morgan for many years through a series of business acquisitions and sales; both men were key figures in the Panic of 1907.

Gates was the president of Republic Steel and of the Texas Company, later known as Texaco. He was instrumental in changing the steel industry's production methods from the Bessemer process to the open hearth process and in building the city of Port Arthur, Texas.

== Biography ==
=== Early years ===
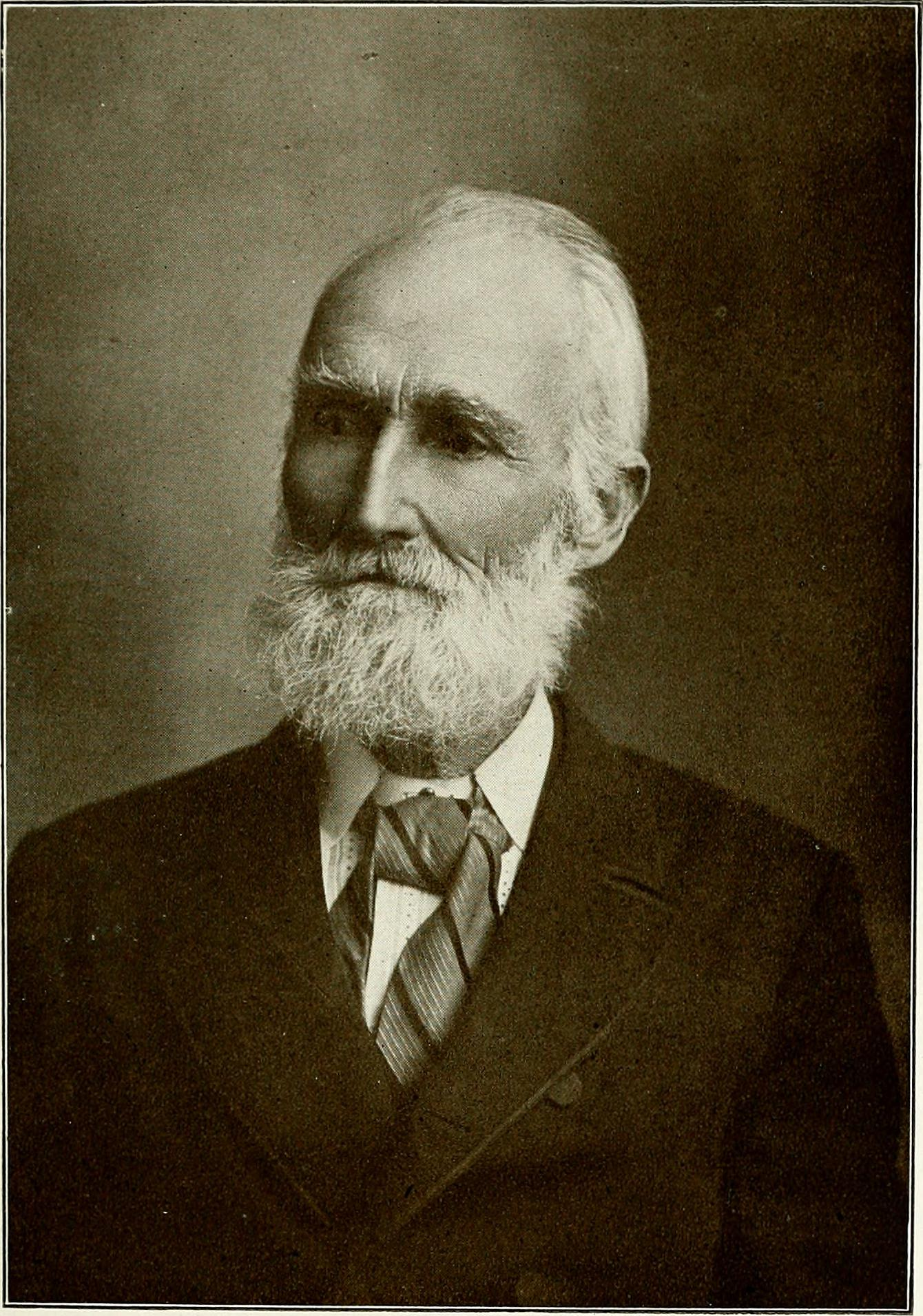
Asel Avery Gates

Gates was born in West Chicago, Illinois (then known as Turner Junction) on May 18, 1855. He was the son of Asel A. and Mary Warne Gates. Gates had two older brothers, George and Gilbert, but both had died by the time he was 15 years old. (Note: George Gates ran away to enlist in the Union army in 1861. He was 16 at the time he enlisted. George was killed in action in 1864.) (Note: His brother, Gilbert, set out with a team and wagon bound for California in the 1870. He was traveling there for health reasons, and became friendly with a man named Alexander Jester, who asked to travel with him. When Gilbert Gates' body was found the next day, Jester had disappeared with the team of horses and the wagon. Asel Gates hired detectives in an effort to find his son's killer. Jester was finally arrested in Mexico, Missouri. Asel Gates traveled to the town to confront Jester, but he escaped from the local jail on the day the elder Gates arrived there. Gates never gave up the search for his brother's murderer, but it was 30 years before he had any substantial clues. Jester's sister became angry with him and wrote a letter to John Gates, saying that Jester was living with her and that he had confessed to her that he murdered Gilbert Gates. Jester was 80 years old when he went to trial but was ultimately acquitted.) While Gates was raised in a religious household, his mother, Mary, became more religious after the deaths of her two older sons. Because he had been involved in some harmless childhood mischief in both grammar and Sunday School, he was accused of stealing a collection at the Sunday School. He was barred from attending church as a result. (Note: Gates never forgot the false accusation. Thirty years later, when he was a very wealthy man, he was asked to contribute to the building fund for a new Methodist church in West Chicago. The false accusation was still vivid in Gates' memory and he refused to give one cent toward a new church building.)

Gates was raised on the family's farm, but did not care for farm life. At an early age, he entered into his first business proposition: to husk a neighbor's corn. His next business venture was to clear some land of timber for another neighbor. Gates earned US$1,000 for this job, selling the timber as firewood to homes and to the railroad. Gates then took the money from this labor and bought a half interest in a threshing machine. As this type of equipment was very new at the time, few farms owned one, so Gates and his partner hired themselves out to work with it at various local farms. After one season, Gates tired of this type of work and he sold his interest in the threshing machine to his partner and another friend. Gates then set himself up as a local grain broker, doing business from the family's home. This business venture was a failure; in an effort to escape farm work, he took to spending time at the railroad depot where he had previously sold firewood. The railroad men remembered him and now asked him to join their poker games. Gates found he had an aptitude for the game and for anticipating the cards men held and how they would play them. With the grain brokerage now forgotten, he was able to make up the losses at the card table.

While attending a house party near St. Charles, he met and fell in love with a farmer's daughter, Dellora Baker. Gates proposed to her at one of the house parties. Dellora was willing to accept Gates' proposal, but wondered how he would be able to provide for a wife, as his only income came from winning at the railroad poker games. When his father discovered Gates in a poker game with some railroad men in the family's barn, Asel told his son he was no good and would never be any good. Only Mary's mediation stopped her son from leaving home. With the realization that he needed more education than grammar school had provided, he announced to his parents that he would be enrolling in some local college classes. Gates attended some courses at nearby Wheaton College and graduated from North Central College in 1876. He had little opportunity to put his new business education to work, as the financial Panic of 1873 began just as he was completing his college work. In order to be able to marry Dellora, Gates accepted every type of job he could get for the next year; most of them were for farm work. Gates and Dellora were married on February 25, 1874. (Note: Because of the times, Gates was only able to give the minister US$5.00 for performing his marriage ceremony. He met Reverend Foster again in 1909 and apologized for not being able to give the clergyman more at the time of the marriage. Saying he was paying some of the interest he owed on the debt, Gates gave Reverend Foster a US$100 bill.)

=== Marriage and early business ventures ===
Gates tried to revive his grain brokerage business but lost all his savings through it. When the couple's first child was stillborn, Gates returned to his old pattern of playing poker and thought seriously about leaving town with Dellora. With this knowledge, Mary Gates told her husband he needed to help his son financially so he could start a new business. Gates' father-in-law, Ed Baker, had already offered to help his daughter and son in law in this way. Asel purchased a two-story brick building and Ed Baker provided the capital for stock to open a hardware store in Turner Junction. At first the business went well; Gates and Dellora were able to move into their own home. Gates began taking time away from the hardware store and while his partner tried to handle all the business, he was not able to. A son, Charles Gilbert Gates, was born to Gates and Dellora on May 21, 1876. Gates began to complain of various ailments soon after the baby's birth; at times, he would take to his bed for some days with them. Business at the hardware store had become so bad, Gates was not able to afford the rent on the family's home. They had to move into two rooms above the hardware store, with Gates saying he was too ill to help with the moving and packing.

While at the hardware store, Gates met a salesman who was in the barbed wire business. As a result, Gates became interested in the relatively new product. When he announced his intentions to sell his interest in the hardware store and become a traveling salesman for the product, his wife and mother were both in favor of the plan. (Note: Mary Gates realized she had a connection to Joseph Glidden, the patent holder. She was related to his wife, Lucinda. Gates' mother wrote a letter to Lucinda Glidden asking that her son be interviewed for a salesman's job.) He made a trip to San Antonio, Texas, in 1876, where Isaac Ellwood hired him as a salesman for the Washburn-Moen barbed wire company. After being assigned to work in Texas, Gates quickly learned that while he found friends and poker playing companions, when it came to selling barbed wire, ranchers were not buying. After watching a medicine show proprietor stage an elaborate presentation for his wares and noting that people fought to buy the products sold, Gates decided to have a similar production to demonstrate the merits of barbed wire. In San Antonio's Military Plaza, Gates provoked cattle into charging into a barbed wire fence which did not break. Gates went from not being able to sell his product to not being able to fill orders quickly enough after the demonstration.

=== The barbed wire and steel business ===
Upon Ellwood's refusal to grant him a partnership in the company. Gates traveled to St. Louis, Missouri, where in partnership with Alfred Clifford, he started the Southern Wire Company to compete with Washburn-Moen. Clifford's equipment to manufacture barbed wire had come from George C. Baker, who had invented a machine for producing barbed wire which was similar but not identical to the one made by Isaac Ellwood. Baker had resisted all attempts by Ellwood and Washburn-Moen to buy him out. Gates and Clifford sold their product at a cheaper price than Washburn-Moen. Before long, Washburn-Moen was losing substantial business to Gates and Clifford's Southern Wire Company.

In an effort to stop the success of the former company salesman, Ellwood and Washburn-Moen filed for an injunction to stop the business of Southern Wire Company. The suit, filed in U. S. District Court, claimed the machines Gates and Clifford used in the production of their product were a direct copy of those used by Washburn-Moen. The suit also called for Gates and Clifford to pay US$100,000 in damages to the company. As they avoided process servers, Gates and Clifford made a plan to save their company. They were able to rent a building in East St. Louis, Illinois, and moved their equipment out of the factory and onto a ferryboat after dark. After they crossed the Mississippi River, the machines were out of the jurisdiction of the St. Louis U. S. District Court and were back in business the next day. (Note: Isaac Ellwood continued to pursue the matter even after the Southern Wire Company moved to Illinois. Gates, his wife and son, had relocated to St. Louis after he went into business with Alfred Clifford. The family was returning to St. Louis after a visit with family in Turner Junction when Gates caught sight of two suspicious looking men. He knew they were process servers and told his wife to hurry and get on the train. Dellora and Charlie jumped on a coach car while Gates ran with the two men after him. Gates was able to find an open boxcar and jump in; he hid there until the two process servers gave up their search for him. He jumped on the last car of the train his wife and son were already on as it was pulling out of the station.) When Clifford and Gates hired an attorney to answer the charges made against them in court, the judge ruled that the manufacturing process used by Southern Wire Company was not an infringement on any patents or machinery owned by Ellwood and Washburn-Moen.

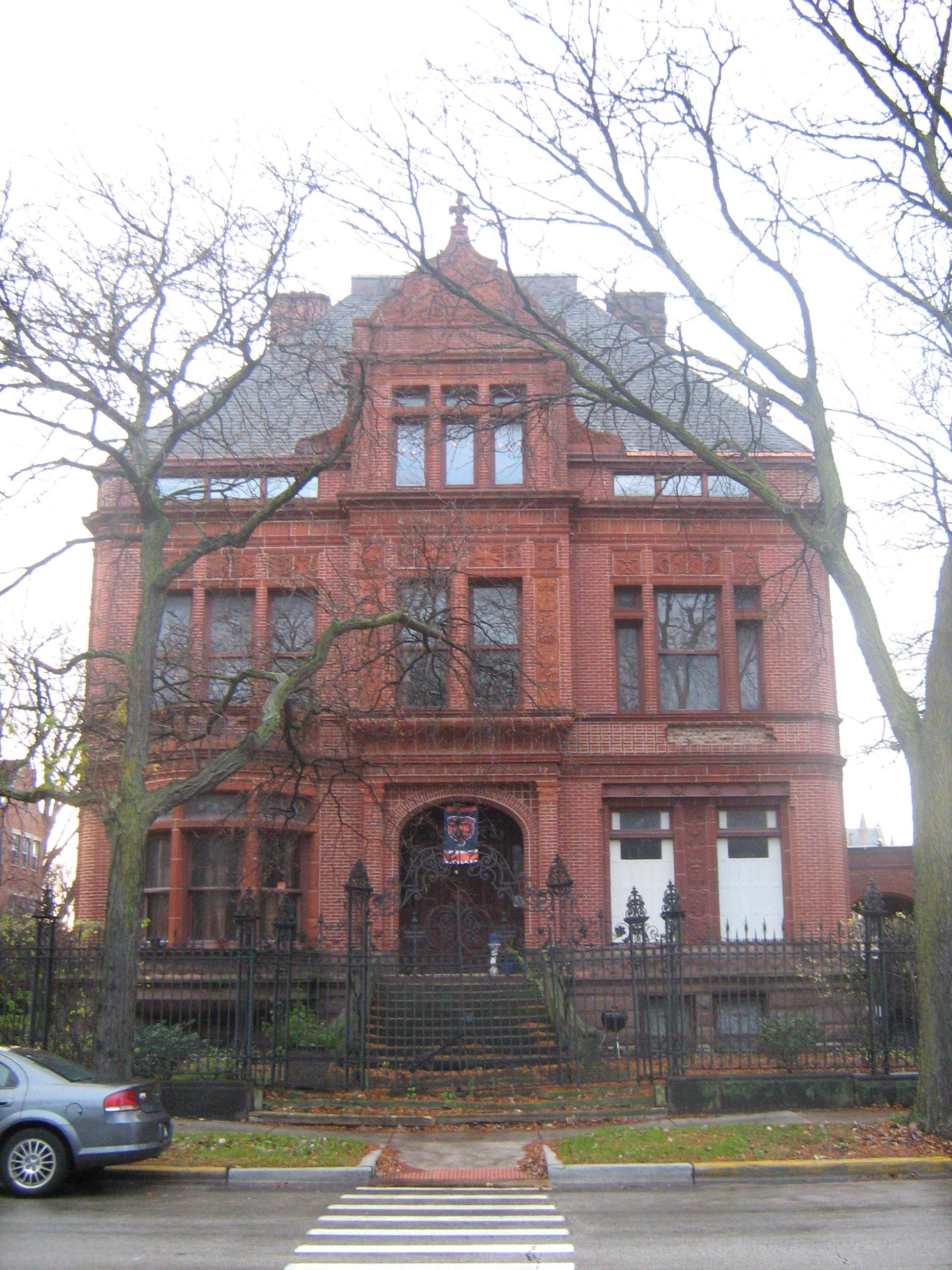
Gates owned the Sydney Kent House at 2944 South Michigan Avenue on Chicago's South Side from 1896 to 1906 The house is now listed on the National Register of Historic Places

After a fire destroyed the Southern Wire Company, Gates gambled on the idea that William C. Edenborn had not heard the news and approached him for a merger with the idea that Southern Wire would manufacture in Edenborn's now idle barbed wire plant. The new company was known as St. Louis Wire Mill Company. They continued to buy other wire companies and had strong sales. Washburn-Moen went back into court, this time in Des Moines, Iowa, where a federal judge ruled that the machinery created by Baker was an infringement of Washburn-Moen's patents. By this time, Gates had created a syndicate of barbed wire manufacturers who did not produce their wires using Washburn-Moen's methods; the ruling in favor of Washburn-Moen only applied to areas in the jurisdiction of the U. S. Federal Court in Des Moines. Washburn-Moen continued to falter; Isaac Ellwood sent word asking for a meeting with Gates. Ellwood and another key figure with Washburn-Moen, John Lambert, now accepted offers from Gates. The barbed wire legal issues ended with Washburn-Moen selling their patent rights to Gates and his syndicate of wire manufacturers.

Through a series of mergers and acquisitions the company went through various name changes, finally settling on American Steel and Wire Company. Gates and his family moved to Chicago, where they lived for a period of ten years. Chicago attorney Elbert Henry Gary had helped Gates form the syndicate which led to the defeat of Washburn-Moen. Gary was called on again in 1901 to negotiate a merger with J. P. Morgan's U. S. Steel. Though he had provided Gates with some loans and advice in the past, Morgan did not want Gates to be a part of the merged company, saying that there was only a deal without Gates. Morgan made an offer to Gates for the American Steel and Wire Company, telling him that he was not welcome to take part in the business of U. S. Steel-either as part of management or on the company's board of directors. Morgan continued by saying that if Gates did not accept his offer, U. S. Steel intended to build its own wire production plant. (Note: Before the merger was finalized, Morgan kept in regular contact with Gates. When Gates was not named to the US Steel board of directors, it was a surprise to everyone but Morgan.)

=== Railroads, oil and Port Arthur, Texas ===
Gates never forgot J. P. Morgan's snub at the U. S. Steel merger. One month after the deal was completed, he became involved in a struggle between E. H. Harriman of the Union Pacific Railroad and James J. Hill of the Northern Pacific Railway. Both men sought control of the Chicago, Burlington and Quincy Railroad. Hill, who was financed by J. P. Morgan, needed access to Chicago; Harriman was interested in stopping Hill from obtaining it. Gates saw this as an opportunity to get back at Morgan for his refusal to seat him on the board of U. S. Steel. Along with Harriman, he began buying shares of Northern Pacific stock. When James Hill noted a sudden rise in Northern Pacific stock prices, he traveled to New York to consult with Morgan. Morgan and Hill stopped the sales of the Northern Pacific stock, which remained high while other stocks took steep drops. Those who had been selling short could not obtain enough stock to cover themselves and were faced with large financial losses. It was rumored that Gates was short 60,000 shares of Northern Pacific stock. Gates did not confirm or deny any of the rumors about the railroad stock and would only say that he was doing well.

As Gates continued to search for a way to get back at Morgan for cutting him out of U. S. Steel, he found a vulnerability in Morgan's railroad holdings in 1902 and began buying large numbers of shares in Morgan's Louisville and Nashville Railroad. When it was decided to add another short line to the L&N system, its board of directors voted to issue 50,000 new shares of stock to finance the new line. A clerical error offered the stock for sale before it could be listed on the New York Stock Exchange. Gates saw the offering and purchased the shares prior to their listing; he also continued buying all the Louisville and Nashville stock he was able to. Gates had enough shares of the railroad to duplicate the panic that ensued the year before with the Great Northern Railway shares. J. P. Morgan learned of the events in April 1902 and found that Gates now owned more than 51 percent of the Louisville and Nashville's stock. Morgan decided to act to stop another Wall Street panic, and asked what Gates' terms of sale would be. Gates wanted US$150 per share of stock, an offer which Morgan initially rejected. He then dispatched his aide, George Walbridge Perkins, to talk to Gates and make the best possible arrangements. Perkins called on Gates in his Waldorf-Astoria suite at 1:30 am. The deal for the Louisville and Nashville cost Morgan US$43 million, with Gates making a more than US$15 million profit from the transaction.

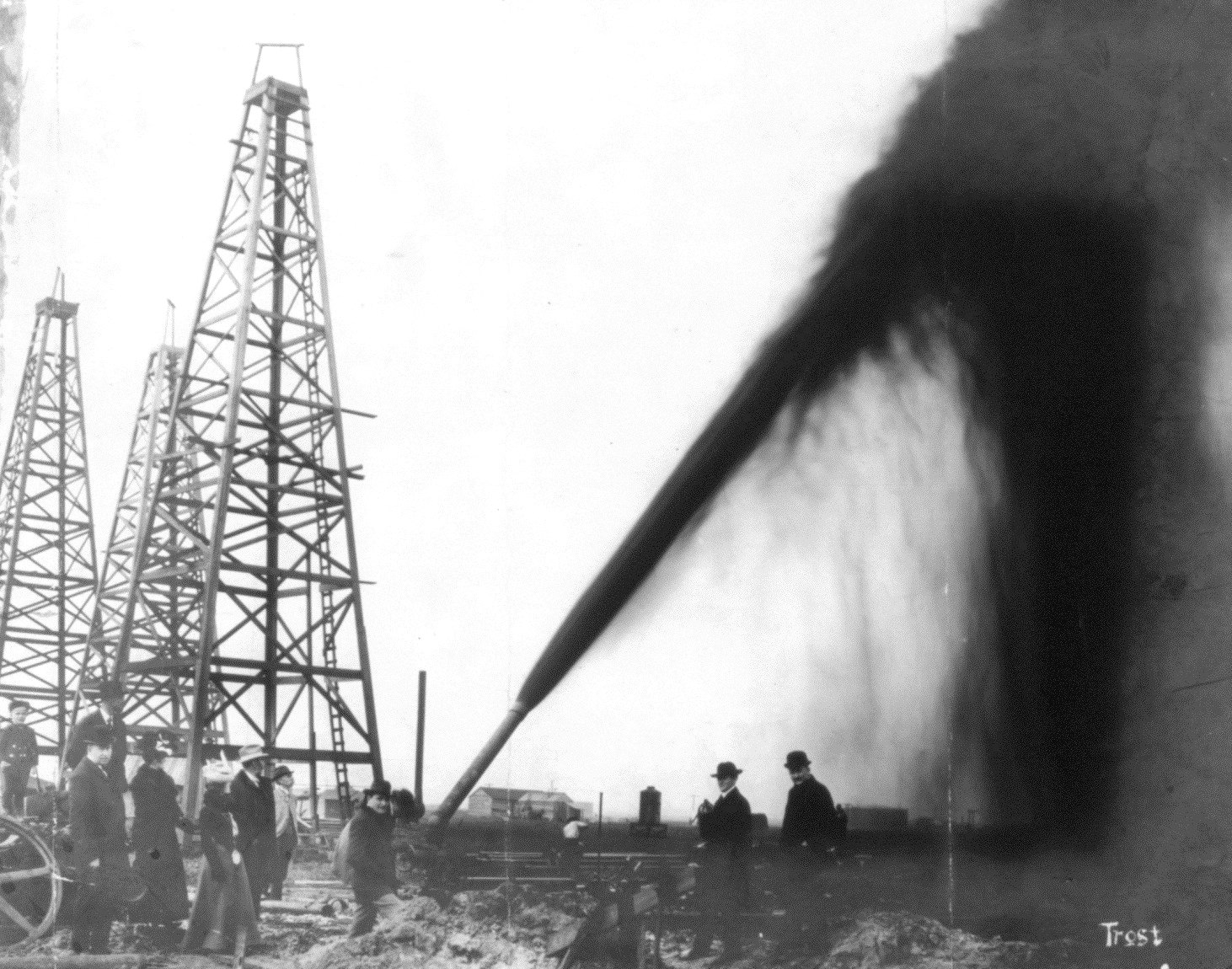
Oil gusher at Port Arthur, Texas, 1901

After the Louisville and Nashville Railroad incident, Gates found that public opinion had turned against him as a result of it. Gates talked some associates into submitting his son's name for membership in the New York Yacht Club and New York's Union League Club. (Note: J. P. Morgan was a member of both clubs.) The application for Charlie Gates went from one desk to another for a number of weeks. When young Gates' name was brought up for a vote, the members of the admissions committee were unanimous in their "no" decision. Gates threatened to sue the club and the members denied his charges of Morgan being behind Charlie Gates' refusal. Gates withdrew Charlie's Yacht Club and Union League Club applications, apparently resigned that his son would not be a member of either society. When he and Dellora traveled to England, the couple wanted to stay at Claridge's, as they had done in 1900. Claridge's refused to accept their registration as Gates was now on the hotel's list of undesirables.

Pattillo Higgins had begun a well on Spindletop in 1900, but ran out of money to continue drilling for oil. Higgins went to Gates for funds to continue; Gates obliged. The Texas Fuel Company, founded by Joseph S. Cullinan, had little experience in drilling wells and producing crude oil. As such, they founded the Producers Oil Company on January 17, 1902, as an affiliate of The Texas Fuel Company. Investors like Gates invested "certificates of interest" to the sum of around $90,000 and Gates would invest another $590,000 in the company prior to it becoming known as Texaco. His investment entitled Gates to 46 percent of the company's stock. When Spindletop came in the next year, Gates was already in control of Port Arthur's docks, its refinery and the railroad needed to get the oil to market.

==== Port Arthur ====
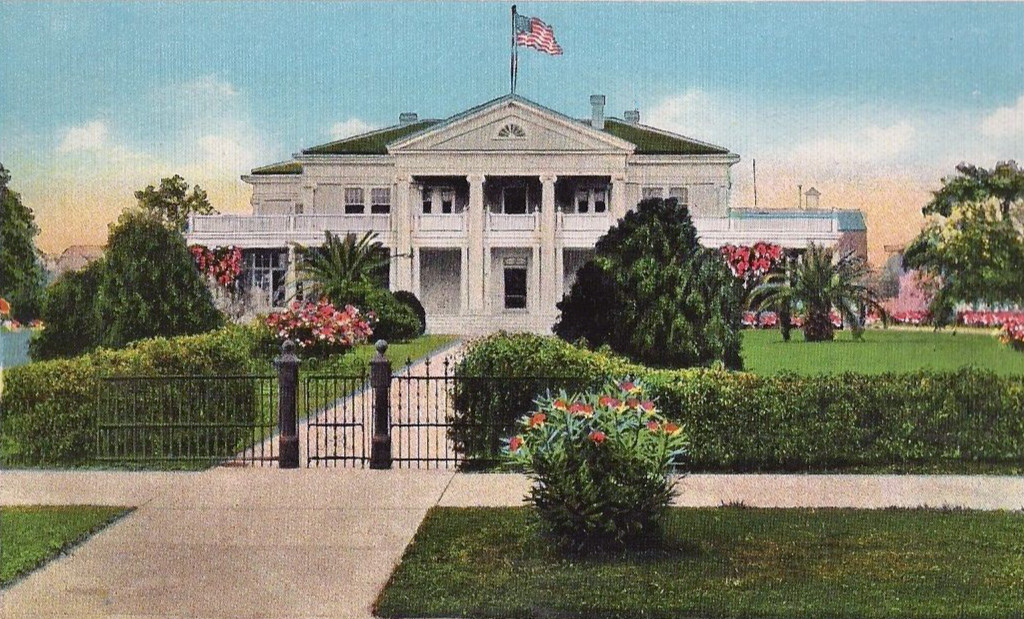
Home of John W. Gates in Port Arthur, Texas

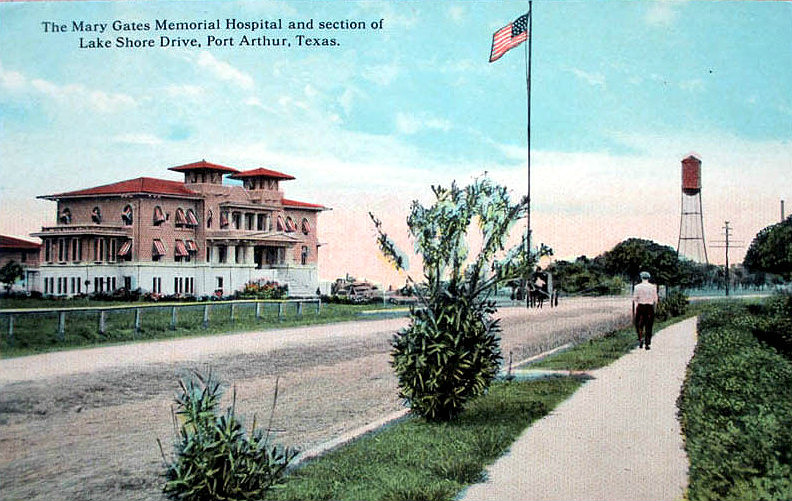
Mary Gates Memorial Hospital, Port Arthur, Texas

Gates became influential in the development of the city of Port Arthur, Texas, when he took over the Kansas City, Pittsburgh and Gulf Railroad in December 1899 after he forced it into bankruptcy along with its previous owner and Port Arthur founder Arthur Edward Stilwell. Gates built a winter home in the city and contributed much to its development. After Gates became the owner of the Port Arthur Canal and Dock Company, he held the asset for a time; in 1906 he gave the canal to the US government under the condition that Port Arthur would be named an international port of entry. Gates founded the first bank, built a rice mill and established the Port Arthur Light, Power and Ice Company. When he decided to make Port Arthur his permanent residence in 1908, the town held a celebration. After Mary Gates died while on a visit to her son and his family in December 1908, Gates built Mary Gates Hospital to honor her memory. He was also a large contributor to Port Arthur Business College, and built a model farm to give the city a source of fresh dairy products.

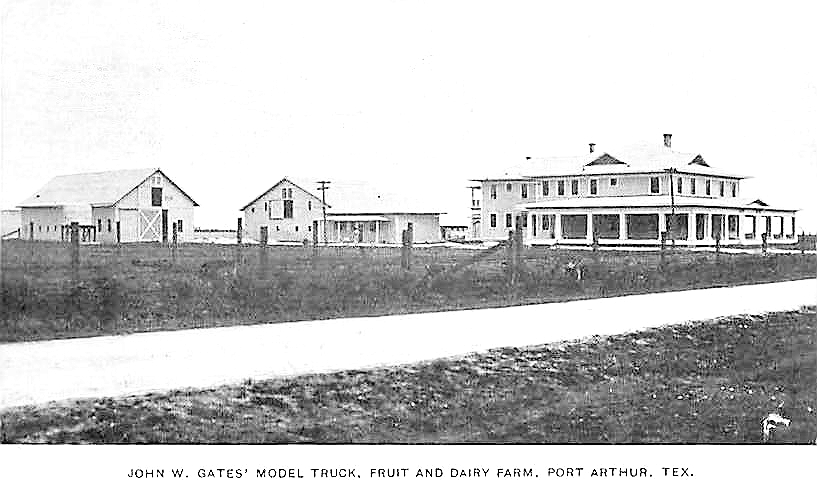
John W. Gates model farm, Port Arthur, Texas

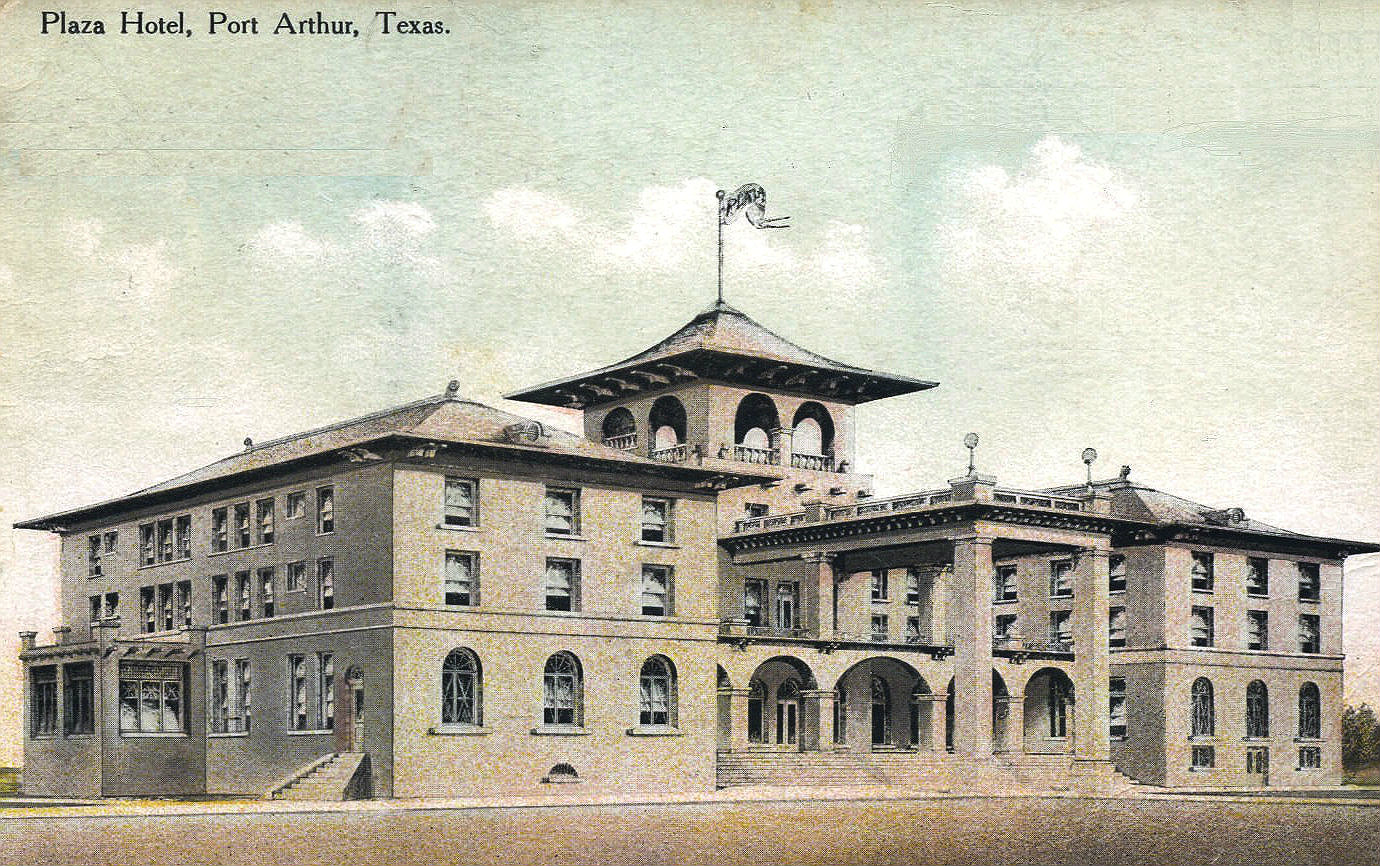
Port Arthur's Plaza Hotel in 1909

After Port Arthur's Hotel Sabine burned to the ground in 1904, Gates decided that the city needed a good hotel to replace it. In 1909, he proposed to build another, called the Plaza, on the site the Hotel Sabine had once occupied. Gates could have easily afforded to finance the entire cost of the new hotel, but he wanted Port Arthur's residents to have an equal share in the venture. Gates held local meetings and was happy to discuss the project or take pledges for the building fund at any time. After the pledges of local businessmen had reached US$150,000, Gates donated the remaining US$150,000, and the project began to be built by United States Realty Company. (Note: The United States Realty Company was also the builder of New York's Plaza Hotel.)

Gates took great pleasure in watching the Plaza Hotel take shape. He was a daily visitor to the construction site as the Spanish mission style building was erected. When the hotel was opened, Gates held a special "billion dollar banquet" on November 15, 1909; his guests were men who owned railroads, Texas Company board members, and other successful men in business. Port Arthur had never seen so many wealthy and powerful men and residents were impressed by the sight of them. Gates served as the hotel's manager in the first few weeks it was in operation. He hired African-Americans as waiters; this was considered to be very bold, as African-Americans were barred from living and working in the city at the time. (Note: Some local trouble makers decided to threaten the waiters; the entire wait staff was ready to quit when Gates arrived one morning, because they were afraid. Gates asked his waiters to stay where they were and then sent his valet to his home for a rifle. While he waited for the rifle, Gates tried speaking to both groups. When the rifle arrived, Gates grabbed it and shouted. "Now, by God, I'll shoot the first man who tries to go and I'll shoot the first sonofabitch who tries to make him go!" The trouble making crowd dispersed; the waiters stayed and were no longer troubled by threats.)

=== The steel industry and dashed hopes ===
Gates continued to have hopes of being able to take on J. P. Morgan again-this time with a rival steel trust. After the sale of his Louisville and Nashville Railroad stocks to Morgan in 1902, Gates quietly began buying shares of Colorado Fuel and Iron Company. He and his associates easily owned more than 50 percent of the company's stock shares, but the company's owner and founder, John C. Osgood, claimed the shares were not valid. Osgood said that while the company was listed on the New York Stock Exchange, any transfer of the shares without his signature and approval, made them invalid. He went on to say that because of their invalidity, those who held shares of the company's stock without them, were not eligible to attend the annual stockholders' meeting. Osgood was upheld in this opinion by the company's board of directors.

Determined to attend the meeting, Gates hired a special train to get to the meeting in Denver. John Osgood was prepared for Gates' arrival. He had obtained a Circuit Court injunction barring Gates and his associates from attending the meeting; the doors of Colorado Fuel and Iron were guarded by sheriff's deputies armed with shotguns. Gates was angry about being refused entry to the meeting, but he became enraged when he learned he was described in the local Circuit Court as a "high roller and a gambler". Gates returned to New York to try utilizing the Federal Court system there. As the legal wrangles continued, the stock of the company began dropping in value; during this time Gates lost US$3 million, but still was unsure of his legal status with Colorado Fuel and Iron. Osgood announced he was willing to meet Gates halfway, but Gates declined the offer. He accused Osgood of tampering with the courts and claimed that he would receive the legal ownership of the company he was due. Apparently feeling that a long battle was not worth it, Gates gave up the fight some weeks later and sold the shares, which eventually wound up with the Rockefeller family. (Note: Some ten years later, it was said that the company was a very poor investment, as its shares of common stock had not produced a cent of dividends in all that time.)

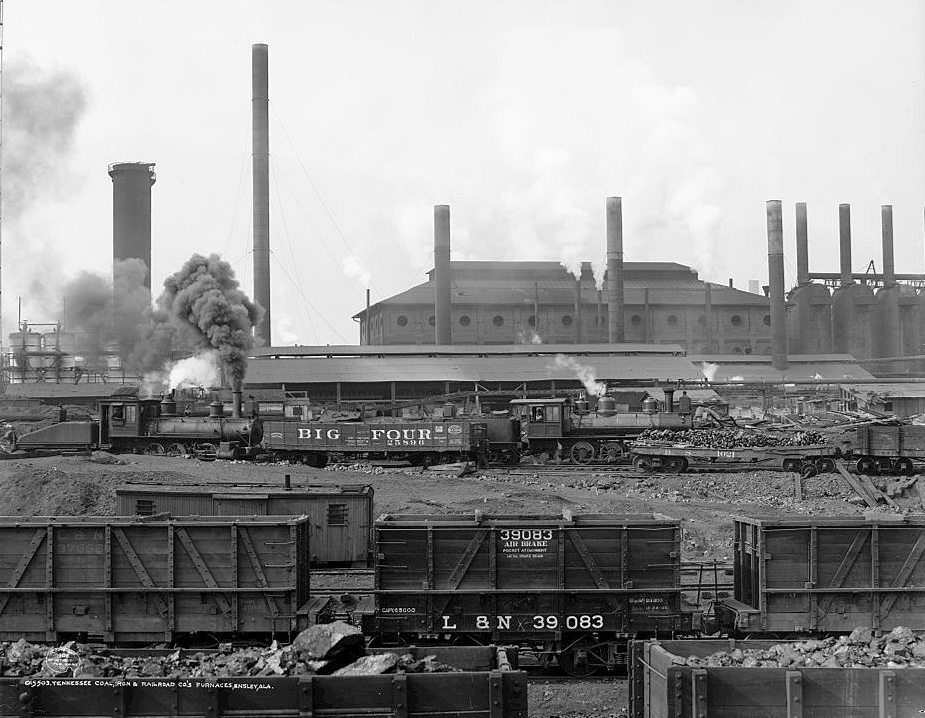
Tennessee Coal and Iron Company's furnace at Ensley, Alabama, circa 1906

Once more, Gates planned to get back into the steel industry. In 1903, he began buying shares of Republic Steel. Its two main competitors were in the US South-Tennessee Coal, Iron and Railroad Company, and the Sloss-Sheffield Iron and Steel Company in Alabama. All three were able to use inexpensive Southern iron ore to produce quality steel with the open hearth process, making the price of the steel produced with it cheaper. The minerals needed for the open hearth process were readily found in Alabama. Gates envisioned bringing Republic, Tennessee Coal and Iron and Sloss-Sheffield together into a steel trust to challenge J. P. Morgan's U. S. Steel. When August Belmont Jr. resigned his seat on Republic's board to concentrate on consolidating the New York transit system, Gates was elected to fill Belmont's seat. (Note: August Belmont Jr. previously had words with Gates about the size of his horse-racing bets.)

Gates found two like-minded members of the board when he began talking about consolidating the three steel companies. One was L. C. Hanna, the brother of Mark Hanna; the other was Grant Schley, who had a Wall Street brokerage. Gates now began purchasing shares of Tennessee Coal and Iron in preparation of the consolidation. In January 1905 he was ready to outline his plan to potential members of the trust, with the exception of Republic's president, A. W. Thompson. When Thompson was advised of the scheme, he declared there would be no such trust with Republic as a member; when put to a formal vote, Republic's board members voted down the idea of joining a trust. During this time, Gates was able to purchase enough shares of Tennessee Coal and Iron to give him a controlling interest in the company.

Gates was riding high with both Republic and Tennessee Coal and Iron doing well with more orders that both could fill. His assessment of the open-hearth process for steel production was confirmed by a report from the US Bureau of Corporations. The report stated that an agent for U. S. Steel and a large railroad affiliated with J. P. Morgan pronounced the rails produced by the open-hearth process to be twice as good at those made by the Bessemer process, which was used by U. S. Steel. The report went on to praise Gates and his competitiveness.

==== The Panic of 1907 ====
In 1907, Gates took his usual summer holiday in Europe. Upon arriving in Paris, he was met with an urgent cablegram from Grant Schley. Schley, the owner of a brokerage and a board member of Republic Steel and Tennessee Coal and Iron, advised Gates of serious business trouble and asked him to return to the US at once. As the Panic of 1907 began, Schley's brokerage had become short of money and it was necessary for him to obtain large loans to try to keep the brokerage solvent. Schley offered some US$6 million shares of Tennessee Coal and Iron Company as part of the collateral for the loans. (Note: This was not in keeping with the pledge made to Gates and the other coalition members; they had all agreed not to dispose of the company's stocks and not to use them for speculation.) Oakleigh Thorne was the president of the Trust Company of America bank and also a member of the Gates coalition. Thorne believed his bank was in sound financial condition until a New York Times article stated otherwise. Thorne told reporters that if he paid off every depositor, he would still have US$4 million in assets. When the clearing house run by J. P. Morgan audited the bank's books, they found the bank was sound, but were quite interested in the Tennessee Coal and Iron Company stock they found and indicated that the stock was not acceptable to them as security. (Note: No answer was provided as to why no Tennessee Coal and Iron Company stock was acceptable to Morgan's clearing house. The company was valued at US$100 million: its stock had a par value of US$100 per share. Tennessee Coal and Iron had been operating at peak capacity through that summer; many U. S. Steel plants had been idled and its common stock had dropped from 47 1/2 to 24 1/2.) (Note: Grant Schley was once more pressured for payment. He again offered his Tennessee Coal and Iron stock as collateral and was told it would not be accepted by Morgan's clearing house. Schley was also told that if his brokerage failed, Oakleigh Thorne's Trust Company of America bank would also fail.)

Morgan proposed to buy Tennessee Coal and Iron to "rescue" all involved with the company. He outlined a plan whereby U. S. Steel would change its second mortgage bonds for Tennessee Coal and Iron stock. (Note: The U. S. Steel second mortgage bonds were quoted at 84, while shares of Tennessee Coal and Iron were valued at 134.) Because the U. S. Steel bonds were acceptable to the clearing house, they would be able to be used for the debts. It was suggested that President Theodore Roosevelt be consulted before such action was taken. Roosevelt was given only an outline of the issue; he was never told which institution would fail without U. S. Steel's takeover of Tennessee Coal and Iron. Roosevelt wrote a note to his Attorney General stating he had not learned the name of the troubled business, but felt that he should not object to this occurrence.

The New York Times, however, printed its amazement that Tennessee Coal and Iron stocks were not acceptable to the clearing house and that the Trust Company of America was deemed insolvent when it had more than enough assets to cover all deposits. The newspaper concluded that U. S. Steel wanted to take over a serious business competitor and the company was only worried about the Sherman Antitrust Act. All of this had taken place before Gates was able to return to New York; when he was briefed on the situation, he was told that all other members of the coalition had agreed to Morgan's terms. (Note: One of Gates' associates remarked that Tennessee Coal and Iron stock withstood the panic and had never been quoted lower than US$140 a share. He went on to say that the panic was used as a ruse to get control of the company.) While Gates realized he had no choice but to submit his shares of stock, he insisted that all stockholders were to be treated equally with regard to the rate of exchange of their shares. Though this was promised, those holding smaller amounts of stock were said to have received less compensation for them. (Note: J. P. Morgan was initially hailed as a hero for putting an end to the panic. A few months later, the newspapers were writing different stories about the incident. It was acknowledged that what was done with Tennessee Coal and Iron stocks was a bold violation of the Sherman Antitrust Act. Financial expert John Moody wrote that if the panic was ended by this transaction, it was ended by "taking a few million from one pocket and putting millions into another". Morgan's associates were accused of lying to Roosevelt about the issue being serious enough to affect the United States; Roosevelt was chided for believing the lie. Roosevelt continued to state he believed the issue was serious enough to affect the nation. However, he would not release reports about the matter which were drawn by both the Bureau of Corporations and the Department of Justice. Senator Charles Allen Culberson introduced a measure in the US Senate demanding the release of this information. When Roosevelt countered that Congress had no power to impel the Executive Branch of the US government to release information it had collected for its own use, the Senate chose to investigate Roosevelt's Attorney General for failure to enforce the Sherman Antitrust Act when it came to U. S. Steel. The resolution was approved, but Roosevelt still refused to release the reports, claiming they were "nobody's damn business". The committee chose to continue the investigation without the reports.) (Note: The New York Times continued to follow the story and printed in a January 1909 edition that a certain New York banker would testify that Tennessee Coal and Iron was a stable company with "gilt-edged" stock values and that Roosevelt had been misled. Hearings began on January 28 behind closed doors, but reporters were able to determine enough of the events that took place to file news stories. Oakleigh Thorne testified that his bank was not helped by the actions of Morgan; stock broker Grant Schley said his brokerage could have been assisted without demanding his Tennessee Coal and Iron stock. Morgan's representative was both evasive and forgetful when questioned. Roosevelt, who was in the process of leaving office, was not censured for his actions because the Senate Committee was deadlocked, 6-6, on this question. The New York Times wrote: "If the president had been less dear to Americans, it is likely there would have been such reluctance to revise his discretion in a difficult case. This is an example of saying one man can steal while another is sent to jail for looking over the fence. The verdict is :Not Guilty-but don't do it again. Public ire about J. P. Morgan and U. S. Steel's role in the events of 1907 did not diminish when the Senate hearing was ended in early 1909.)

==== Aftermath ====
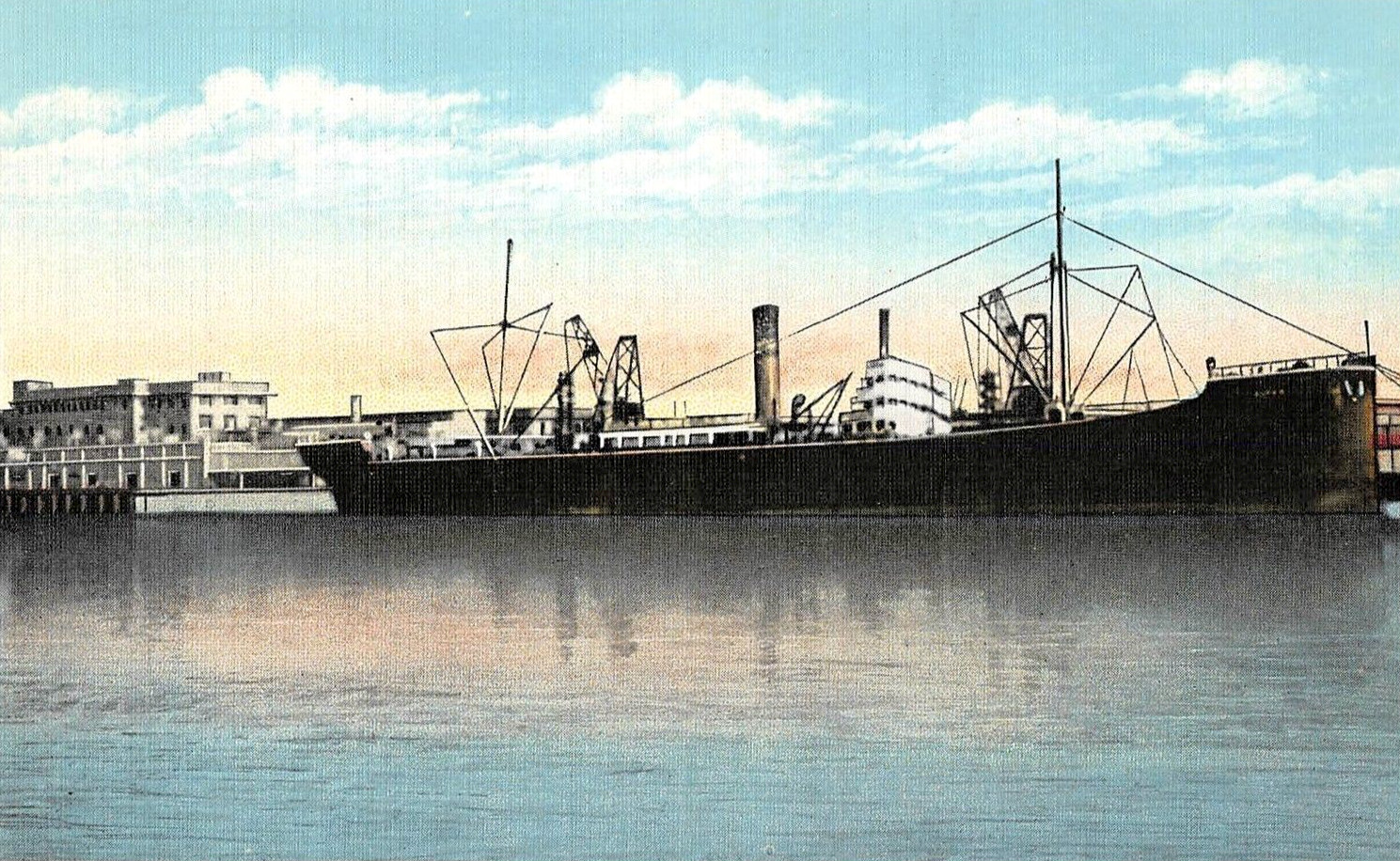
The Texas Company docks, Port Arthur, Texas

Gates involved himself in bettering Port Arthur after losing Tennessee Coal and Iron. He was suffering from a kidney ailment and diabetes and needed to take time away from the town's business when either flared up. He still had control of the Texas Company and was able to successfully battle Rockefeller's Standard Oil, who would have liked to take over his company's land. In 1909, he was taking his usual summer holiday in Europe when members of the Republican party from the Eastern District of Texas nominated him for Congress. He wired the convention to refuse the nomination, saying that he preferred to participate through his financial contributions. Gates had purchased an animal show and a stable of performing horses with the idea of creating a circus for himself and Port Arthur, when in early 1911, he found a growth in his throat. The growth was malignant and there were times Gates was hardly able to speak. (Note: Gates and his group of investors had previously provided the funding for New York's Luna Park and its Hippodrome.)

Congress was beset with requests to deal with the U. S. Steel Trust as they had done with the Tobacco Trust and Standard Oil. The House of Representatives formed a committee to examine the dealings of Morgan's company. Congressman Augustus Owsley Stanley of Kentucky, was named chairman of the committee; in his long list of persons to subpoena for their testimony the first was John Gates. Gates appeared to give his testimony on May 28, 1911; he was seriously ill and this was evident by how thin and pale he had become. He planned a trip to Paris to consult with doctors there after his testimony. Gates spoke of all of his dealings with J. P. Morgan, from the American Steel and Wire Company to the Louisville and Nashville Railroad and to the time when control of Tennessee Coal and Iron Company was wrested from him forcibly. He left for Paris while the committee was still in session. The result of the hearings was an investigation of U. S. Steel and its practices which would last for almost ten years. J. P. Morgan, who held the belief that he had "saved" the country from the Panic of 1907, was disgusted at the "ingratitude" of both the government and the nation's citizens.

== Bet A Million ==
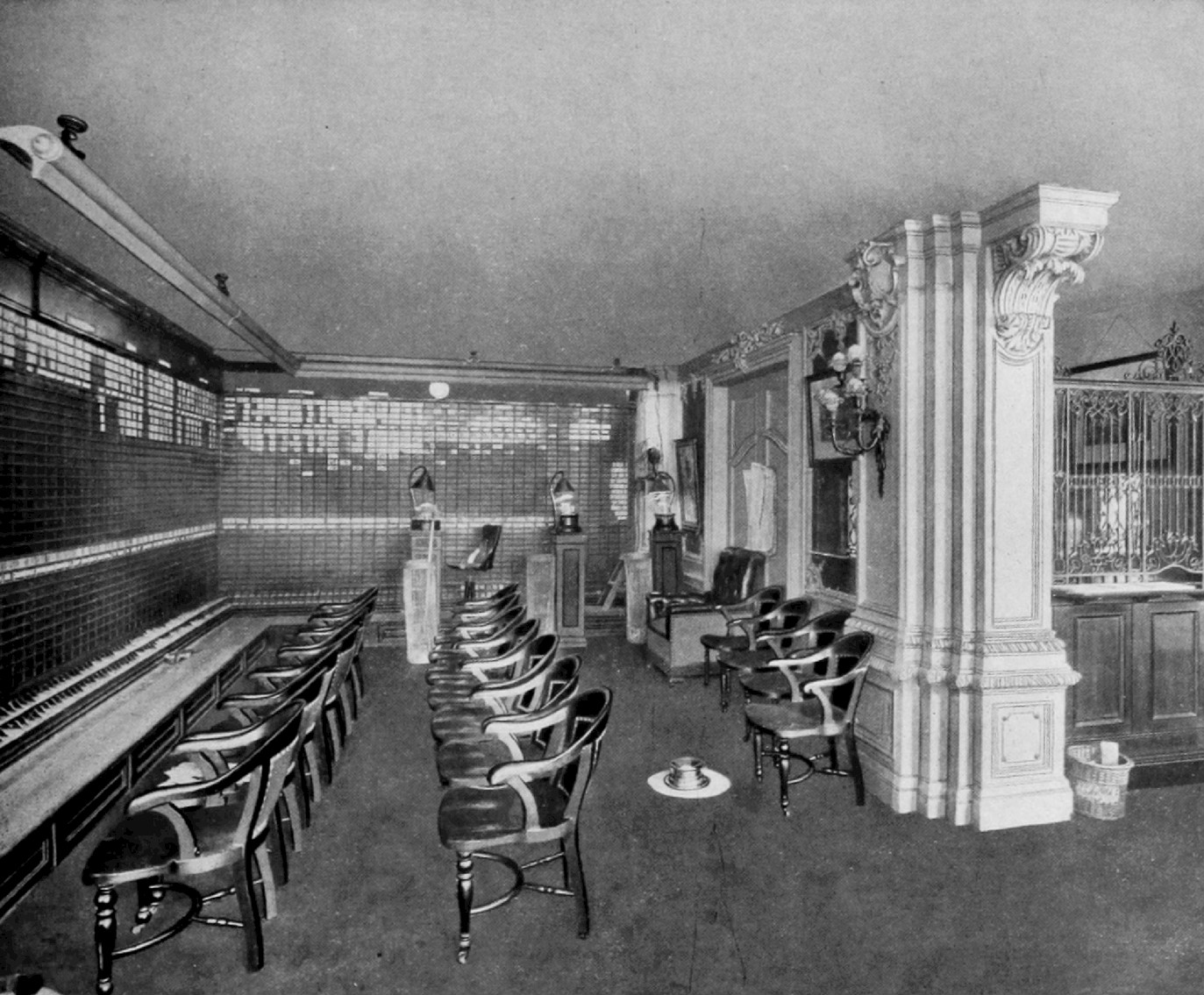
The Gates brokerage in the Waldorf-Astoria

Gates maintained a suite at the Waldorf-Astoria of New York City from 1894 onwards. Though he paid US $30,000 yearly for it, his visits pained the hotel's manager, George Boldt, at times. Gates and his guests were often loud and boisterous. He had a private entrance and elevator, but Gates had a habit of banging on the elevator doors and shouting for service. Boldt instructed his elevator operators to take their time when serving his floor, as it allowed Gates to make as much noise as he wished for a few minutes. Gates' suite was often home to high-stakes poker parties and Baccarat games. Many poker games began on the train from Chicago to New York and were continued at the Waldorf. One poker game lasted for five days and nights; when it was done at least US$2 million had changed hands. Dellora Gates had long since resigned herself to her husband's all-night poker games, but many times became upset about them. Gates made it a practice to keep some unset diamonds in his vest pocket for the times when Dellora became angry about the late hours at cards. He would then present a gem to his wife, who would suddenly forget her anger with him. Dellora would take the diamond to Tiffany & Co. to be set in a piece of jewelry of her choice.

In 1900, Gates won $600,000 on a $70,000 bet on a horse race in England, exaggerated at over $1 million, which conferred on him the nickname "Bet-A-Million". The Waldorf's Oscar Tschirky recalled that Gates did not like the nickname, but did little to repudiate the claims as he would bet on practically everything. Oscar recalled a rainy afternoon in the Waldorf's Oak Room as Gates and two associates watched raindrops trickle down the windows. Gates remarked that the drops did not move down the window at the same speed. One of Gates' associates spotted two raindrops that were moving at the same rate and pointed them out to him. Gates selected a raindrop and bet his associate that it would reach the bottom of the window first. His associate took him up on the bet and before Gates' raindrop had won the race, the bets had changed from hundreds of dollars to thousands. Gates believed that all life was a gamble; a farmer gambled that he would have a successful harvest when planting crops, a merchant gambled that customers would buy items when ordering stock and a traveler gambled on arriving safely when setting out on a journey.

Gates continued his heavy betting on horse races when in the United States. In 1902, he attended the American Derby at Chicago's Washington Park Race Track, favoring Wyeth, the horse of an associate. When Wyeth won, Gates had profited close to US$100,000. At yet another race, Gates won US$650,000 from his large bets. The Jockey Club president, August Belmont, Jr., asked Gates to limit his bets to US$10,000, as such large wagers gave the impression that the races were not honest ones. Outside of his own hotel suite, Gates' favorite spot in New York City was the gambling establishment opened by Richard Canfield in 1898. The club was at 5 East 44th Street. Delmonico's was next door and provided catering to the club's guests. When there or at Canfield's Saratoga clubhouse, Gates' favored game was faro which he had learned while selling barbed wire in Texas.

Gates set up a brokerage office in the hotel's main lobby for his son, Charlie, and an experienced stockbroker. He speculated on Wall Street from there. In early 1907, when Gates realized that the market would be headed for a sharp downturn, he closed the offices of Charles G. Gates and Company, announcing he was done with Wall Street for good. Gates also changed his New York residence in May of the same year. He had purchased a substantial number of shares in the United States Realty Company, which had built New York's Plaza Hotel and was able to design his own 16 room apartment at the Plaza.

== Death and legacy ==
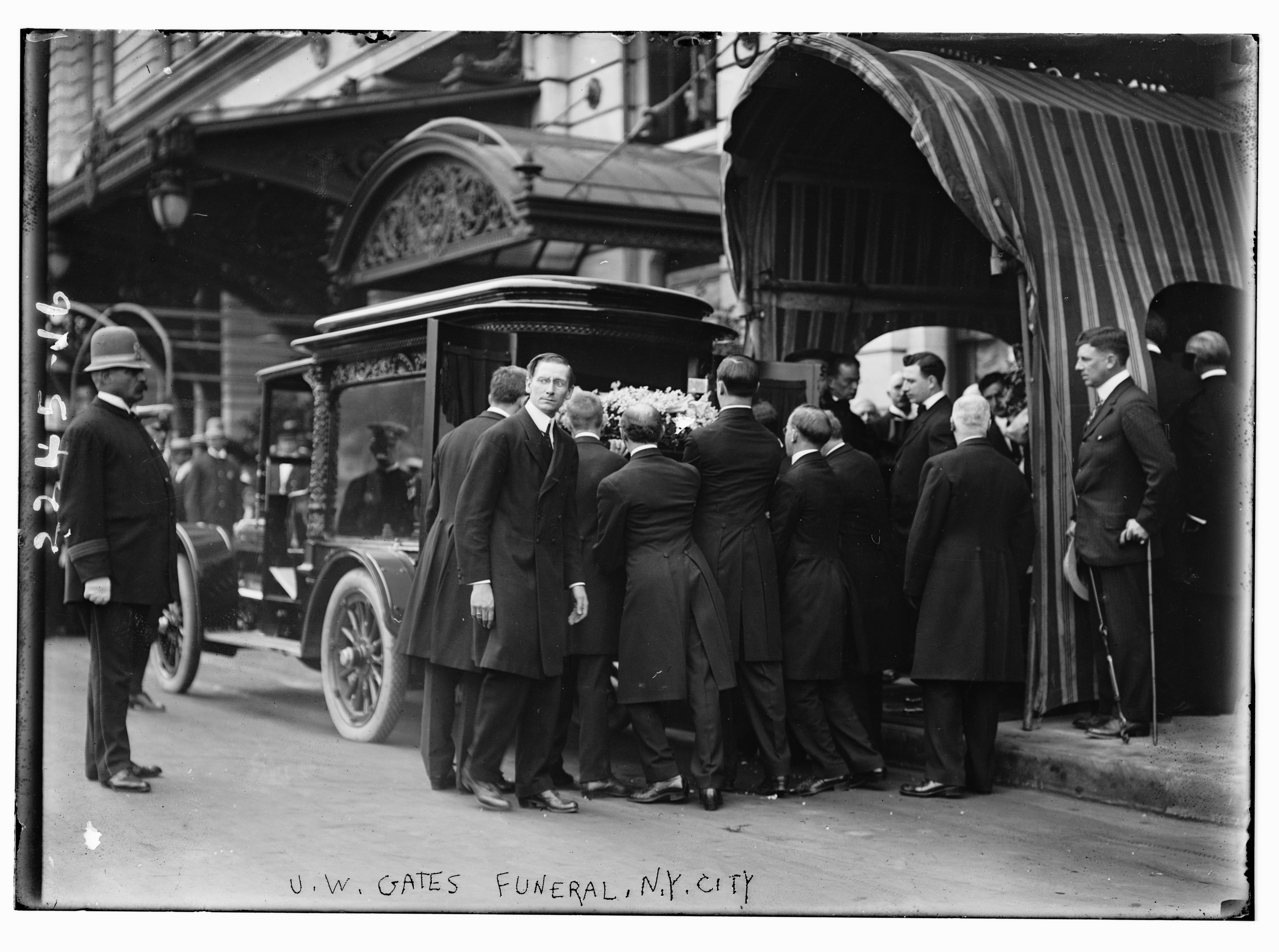
Gates funeral in 1911 in Manhattan

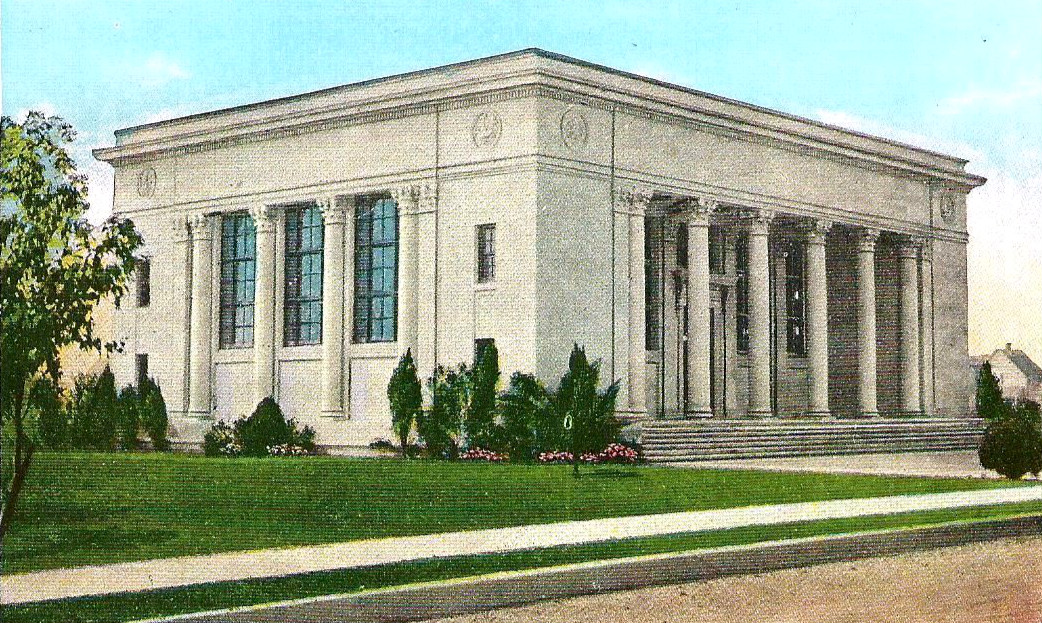
Gates Memorial Library, Port Arthur, Texas

Gates died in Paris, France, on August 9, 1911, following an unsuccessful operation to remove a throat tumor. His funeral was held on August 23, 1911, in the ballroom of the Plaza Hotel in New York; Gates had provided the funding for the construction of the hotel. Gates' mourners had come from all parts of the country; three floors of the Plaza Hotel were reserved for those attending his services. A large delegation arrived from Texas, where Gates had done much for the city of Port Arthur.

The city of Port Arthur held its own memorial service on the same day Gates was buried. Flags were lowered to half staff and from noon until 6 pm all businesses in Port Arthur were closed; the city's docks and refineries also stopped their operations during this time to honor Port Arthur's benefactor. While Gates left the bulk of his estate to his wife and son, he inserted a clause in his will that prohibited his family from selling any of his securities until ten years after his death. Gates is said to have included the clause in his will to protect friends who had invested with him from these securities being sold soon after his death. Gates' estate was valued at between US$40 and US$50 million. He was buried in the family mausoleum at Woodlawn Cemetery in The Bronx, New York City. (Note: Gates' son, Charlie, died in his sleep in his private railroad car while in Cody, Wyoming, on October 20, 1913. Dellora Gates continued to live in the Plaza Hotel apartment she had shared with her husband. On November 28, 1918, she died suddenly in her suite there. She and Charlie are also buried in the Gates mausoleum at Woodlawn Cemetery. Dellora's brother, Edward J. Baker, and niece, Dellora Angell Norris, inherited the Gates fortune.) The mausoleum is featured in one of the opening scenes in the film Once Upon a Time in America.

The Gates Memorial Library in Port Arthur was funded by his widow and donated to the city in 1918. Originally the city's public library, Gates Memorial now serves as the campus library for Lamar State College–Port Arthur. It was entered into the National Register of Historic Places in 1981. In 1971, Gates was honored with a state historical marker at the site of his Military Plaza barbed wire demonstration in San Antonio.

In 1909, as a gift to the city of Port Arthur, TX, and to improve the educational training and opportunities of the community, John Gates founded Port Arthur College, a private institution. In 1975 Port Arthur was converted to a public college and renamed Lamar University – Port Arthur, later changed to Lamar State College – Port Arthur.

John Gates is featured in the Museum of the Gulf Coast in Port Arthur, TX.

In 1972, he was inducted into the Hall of Great Westerners of the National Cowboy & Western Heritage Museum.

== Bibliography ==
- Alexiou, Alice Sparberg (2010). The Flatiron: The New York Landmark and the Incomparable City That Arose with It. New York: Thomas Dunne Books. ISBN 978-1-4299-2387-3 – via Google Books.
- Bruner, Robert F.; Carr, Sean D. (2007). The Panic of 1907: Lessons Learned from the Market's Perfect Storm. Hoboken, N.J.: John Wiley & Sons. ISBN 978-0-470-15263-8. LCCN 2007009236.
- Coit, Margaret L. (1957). Mr. Baruch. Boston: Houghton Mifflin. LCCN 56010289 – via Internet Archive.
  - Reprinted Coit, Margaret L. (2000). Mr. Baruch. Washington, D.C.: Beard Books. ISBN 978-1-5879-8021-3 – via Google Books.
- Homans, James E., ed. (1918). The Cyclopedia of American Biography. Vol. 8. New York: The Press Association Compilers. LCCN 15015825 – via Internet Archive.
- Morris, Lloyd R. (1996). Incredible New York: High Life and Low Life from 1850 to 1950. Syracuse, N.Y.: Syracuse University Press. ISBN 978-0-8156-0334-4 – via Google Books.
- Schriftgiesser, Karl (1943). Oscar of the Waldorf. New York: E. P. Dutton. hdl:2027/uc1.$b667509. LCCN 43015665.
- Sizer, Mona D. (2009). Outrageous Texans: Tales of the Rich and Infamous. Lanham, Maryland: Taylor Trade Publications. ISBN 978-1-5897-9402-3 – via Google Books.
- Warshow, Robert Irving (1932). Bet-A-Million Gates: The Story of a Plunger. New York: Greenberg. LCCN 32011357 – via Internet Archive.
- Wendt, Lloyd; Kogan, Herman (1948). Bet a Million! The Story of John W. Gates. Indianapolis: Bobbs-Merrill. hdl:2027/mdp.39015002974452. LCCN 48009117.
  - Reprinted Wendt, Lloyd; Kogan, Herman. Bet a Million! The Story of John W. Gates. New York: Arno Press. ISBN 9780405138218. LCCN 80001349.
