= NGC 5929 =

Seyfert galaxy in the constellation Boötes

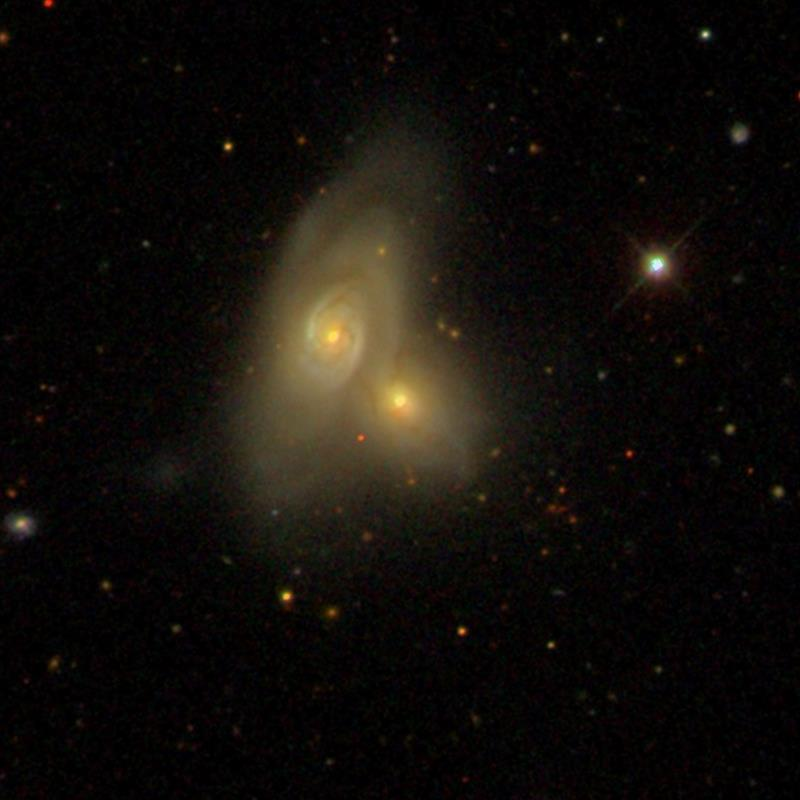
- SDSS image of NGC 5929 (right) with NGC 5930 (left)

Observation data (J2000 epoch)
- Pronunciation: en
- Constellation: Boötes
- Right ascension: 15^{h} 26^{m} 07.987^{s}
- Declination: +41° 40′ 33.92″
- Redshift: 0.008723
- Distance: 133 Mly (40.8 Mpc)
- Apparent magnitude (V): 14.0

Characteristics
- Type: E/S0, Sab
- Apparent size (V): 1.830′ × 0.915′ (IR)
- Notable features: NGC 5930 is a companion

Other designations
- IRAS F15243+4150, NGC 5929, Arp 90, UGC 09851, LEDA 55076, MCG +07-32-006, PGC 55076

NGC 5929 is a well-studied Seyfert galaxy in the constellation Boötes. It was discovered by English astronomer John Herschel on May 13, 1828. In the revised New General Catalogue it is described as "elongated, brighter toward the middle, with a slightly diffuse halo". This galaxy is located at an estimated distance of 133 million light-years (40.8 megaparsecs). It forms an interacting pair with NGC 5930 at an angular separation of 0.5′; together they form entry number 90 in Halton Arp's 1966 Atlas of Peculiar Galaxies. A dust streak from NGC 5930 appears to lie in front of NGC 5929, suggesting that the former galaxy is the closer member of this pair.

The morphological classification of NGC 5929 is Sab, indicating this is a spiral galaxy with tightly wound spiral arms. It has a Seyfert 2 nucleus with a bi-polar radio jet oriented along a position angle of ~60°. This galaxy is a radio source having a double-lobe structure, with each lobe showing an emission region counterpart in the optical band. When observing the double-ionized oxygen line, each lobe is found to display a velocity component. The peaks of both the radio emission and velocity component are aligned.
