= Sydney Kent House =

Historic house in Illinois, United States

- U.S. National Register of Historic Places
- Chicago Landmark
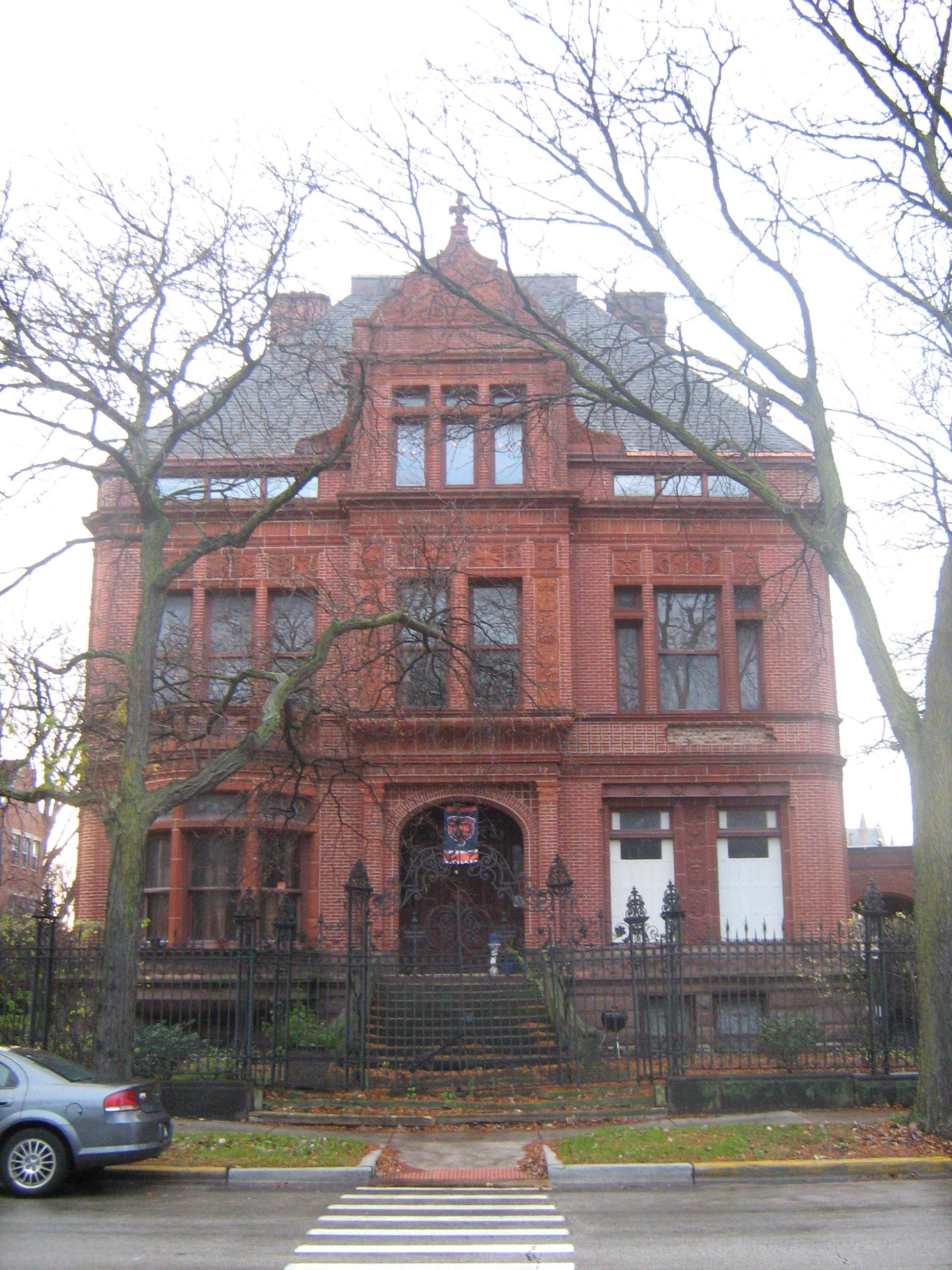
- Sydney Kent House

- Location within Chicago metropolitan area Location within Illinois Location within the United States
- Location: 2944 S. Michigan Ave., Chicago, Illinois
- Coordinates: 41°50′26″N 87°37′27″W
- Built: 1883
- Architect: Burnham & Root; Root, John Wellborn
- Architectural style: Queen Anne
- NRHP reference No.: 77000477

Significant dates
- Added to NRHP: November 17, 1977
- Designated CHICL: March 18, 1987

The Kent House, also known as Sydney Kent House or St. James Convent, is a Queen Anne style house located at 2944 South Michigan Avenue in Chicago, Illinois, United States. The house was designed in 1883 by Burnham & Root for Sidney A. Kent. From 1896 to 1906, it was the home of barbed-wire industrialist and robber baron John Warne Gates, better known as "Bet-a-Million" Gates for his gambling excesses.

In the early 20th century, it served as the main building for what is today, National-Louis University.

It was listed on the National Register of Historic Places in 1977, and it was designated a Chicago Landmark on March 18, 1987.
