= Arthur Stilwell =

American builder and businessman

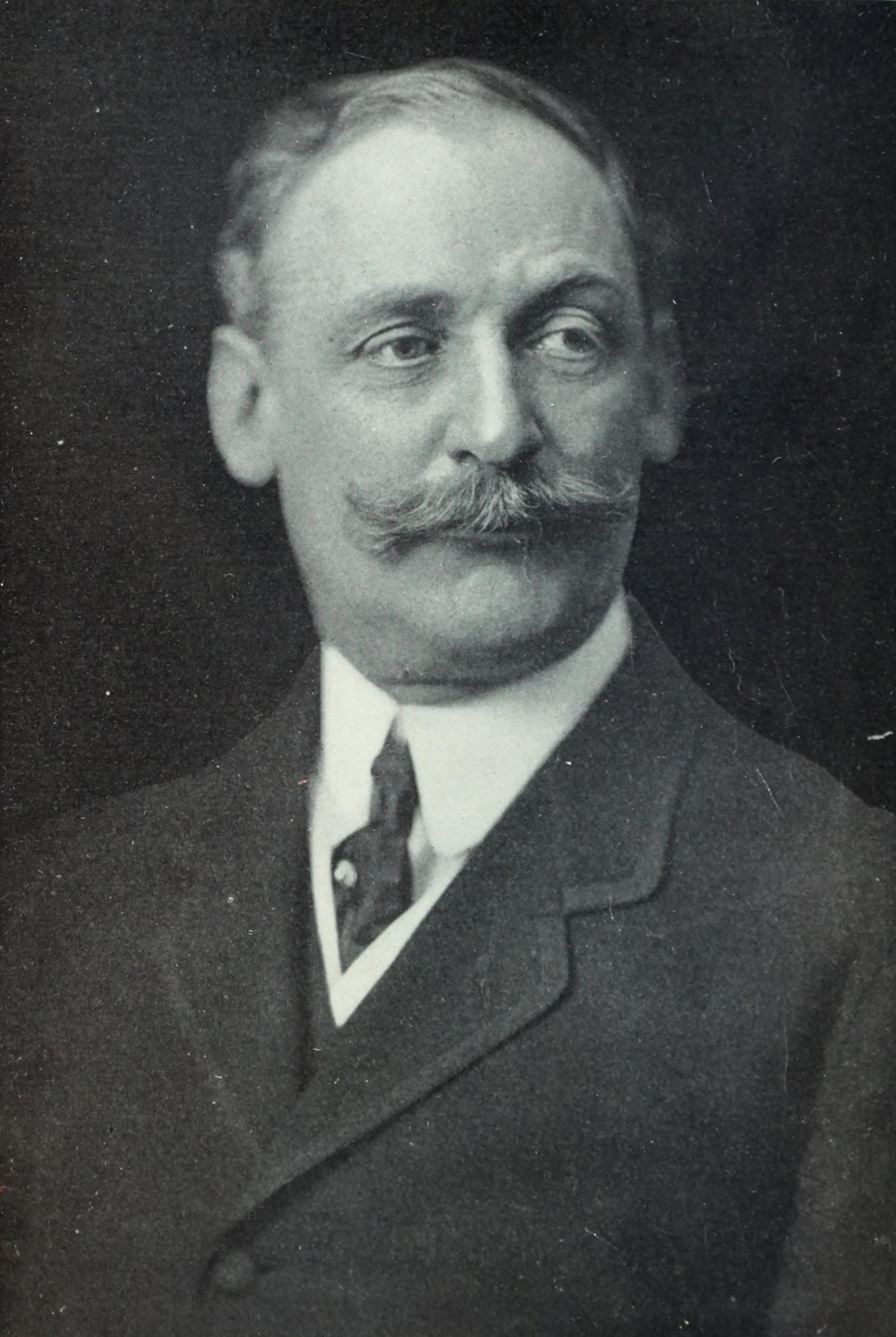
- Arthur Edward Stilwell
- Born: October 21, 1859; Rochester, New York
- Died: September 26, 1928 (aged 68); New York City

Arthur Edward Stilwell (October 21, 1859 – September 26, 1928) was the founder of the Kansas City, Pittsburg and Gulf Railroad, predecessor to the Kansas City Southern Railway. He served as KCPG's president from 1897 to 1900. He was also the founder of Port Arthur, Texas.

== Early life ==
Stilwell was born in Rochester, New York, in 1859. While working as a traveling salesman he courted and married Jennie A. Wood, and the couple moved to Kansas City, Missouri, and then Chicago, Illinois, where Arthur sold insurance for the Travelers Insurance Company, inventing a coupon annuity life-insurance policy which paid the policy holder an income after a certain age.

== Railroad enterprises ==
With the money made selling these policies, the Stilwells returned to Kansas City where Arthur sold real estate and began building the Kansas City Suburban Belt Railway. In his quest to connect Kansas City to the Gulf of Mexico by rail, he began building and acquiring rail lines for the Kansas City, Pittsburg and Gulf Railroad Company (later to become the Kansas City Southern Railroad), plotting townsites along the way which included Mena, Arkansas, Stilwell, Oklahoma, Port Arthur, Texas, and many more.

Setbacks including lawsuits, a hurricane, and yellow fever caused financial problems for the otherwise successful venture, and on April 1, 1899, the KCPG was thrown into receivership by one of its financiers, John Warne Gates, over an unpaid printing bill. Stilwell was out, but the discovery of a giant oilfield in Texas in 1901 ensured the railroad's future success.

Unfazed by losing control of the KCPG, Stilwell announced plans to build a railroad connecting Kansas City with the Pacific Ocean and organized the Kansas City, Mexico and Orient Railway. Although progress was made, financial problems and the Mexican Revolution caused this company to be forced into receivership in March 1912. Ironically, oil was discovered under its tracks and was to contribute to the fortune of its receiver William T. Kemper.

After that, the Stilwells moved to New York, where Arthur spent his time writing books, plays, poems and hymns.

Arthur Stilwell died of apoplexy on September 26, 1928, in New York. His distraught wife, Jennie, committed suicide by jumping out the window of their New York apartment thirteen days later. The Stilwells were said to have left an estate of only $1,000. The cremated remains of the Stilwells have never been located.

In all, Arthur Stilwell organized 41 companies of various kinds during his career. He is credited with building more than 2,300 mi (3,700 km) of railroad in his lifetime and founding more than 40 cities.

== Personal life ==
Stilwell published many books after his retirement in 1912. He wrote novels, poetry and plays. He also wrote political works on world affairs and the monetary system. His writing attracted attention because in them he maintained that he had based many of his life and business decisions on the whispers of what he called fairies or brownies. In his memoirs published in 1927, he reframed this as hunches.

In 1887 Stilwell started the Fairmount Cycling Club and built the amusement center Fairmount Park between Kansas City and Independence, Missouri, ostensibly to boost traffic for one of the trolley lines he owned. It became the Kansas City Athletic Club in 1893. The new club boasted a six-hole golf course, the second in the area after the Kansas City Country Club, based in what became Loose Park. The Fairmount Club eventually became the Evanston Club in 1901, and later moved to a new location at Swope Park in 1905. The quickly expanding sport of golf and the fast growth of the city necessitated another move to a rural 137 acres (0.55 km^{2}) tract outside of the city limits in 1916, becoming the Hillcrest Country Club, now at 82nd and Hillcrest Road in Kansas City. Owing to the club's location outside of the city, it was a far more liberal, wild place than the rich clubs in town, allowing gambling and having the highest number of female and minority members.

== See also ==
- List of railroad executives

== Bibliography ==
- Keith L. Bryant, Jr., Arthur E. Stilwell and the Founding of Port Arthur: A Case of Entrepreneurial Error, Southwestern Historical Quarterly 75 (July 1971).
- Keith L. Bryant, Jr., Arthur E. Stilwell: Promoter with a Hunch (Nashville: Vanderbilt University Press, 1971).
- David M. Pletcher, Rails, Mines, and Progress: Seven American Promoters in Mexico, 1867-1911 (Ithaca: Cornell University Press, 1958).
- Arthur E. Stilwell and James R. Crowell, I Had a Hunch (Port Arthur Historical Society, 1972).

== Sources ==
- Arthur Stilwell.com Accessed January 2010. Contains downloadable copies of some of Stilwell's books and poetry.
- Museum of the Gulf Coast ~ Arthur Stilwell Biography, Accessed January 2010.
- Arthur Stilwell: Railroad Visionary at the Kansas City Public Library, Accessed January 2010 Contains downloadable copies of some of Stilwell's books and poetry.

Business positions
Preceded by Edward L. Martin	President of Kansas City Southern Railway; 1897 – 1900	Succeeded by Samuel W. Fordyce
