= Charles Gilbert Gates =

American businessman (1876–1913)

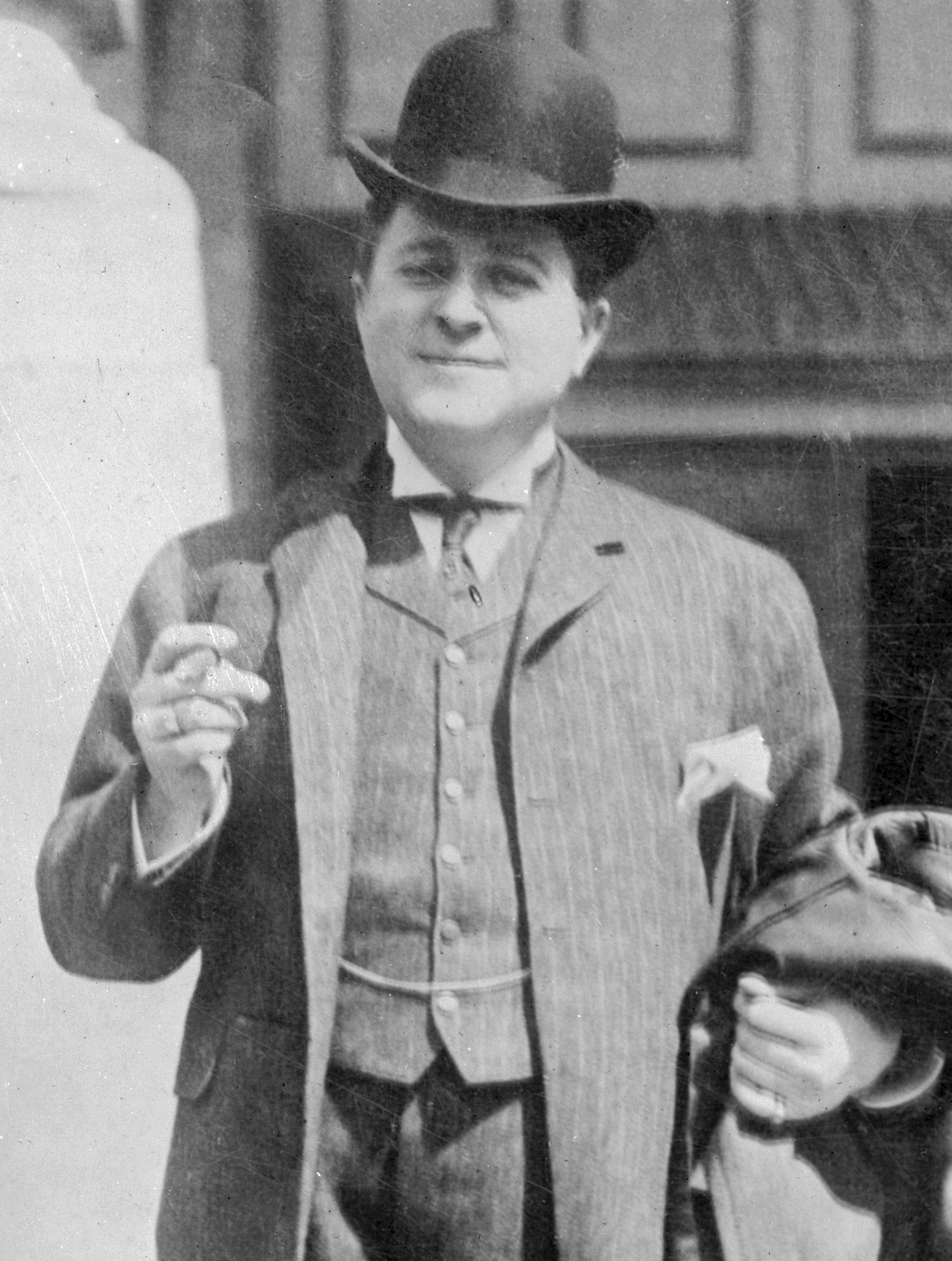
Charles Gilbert Gates in 1903

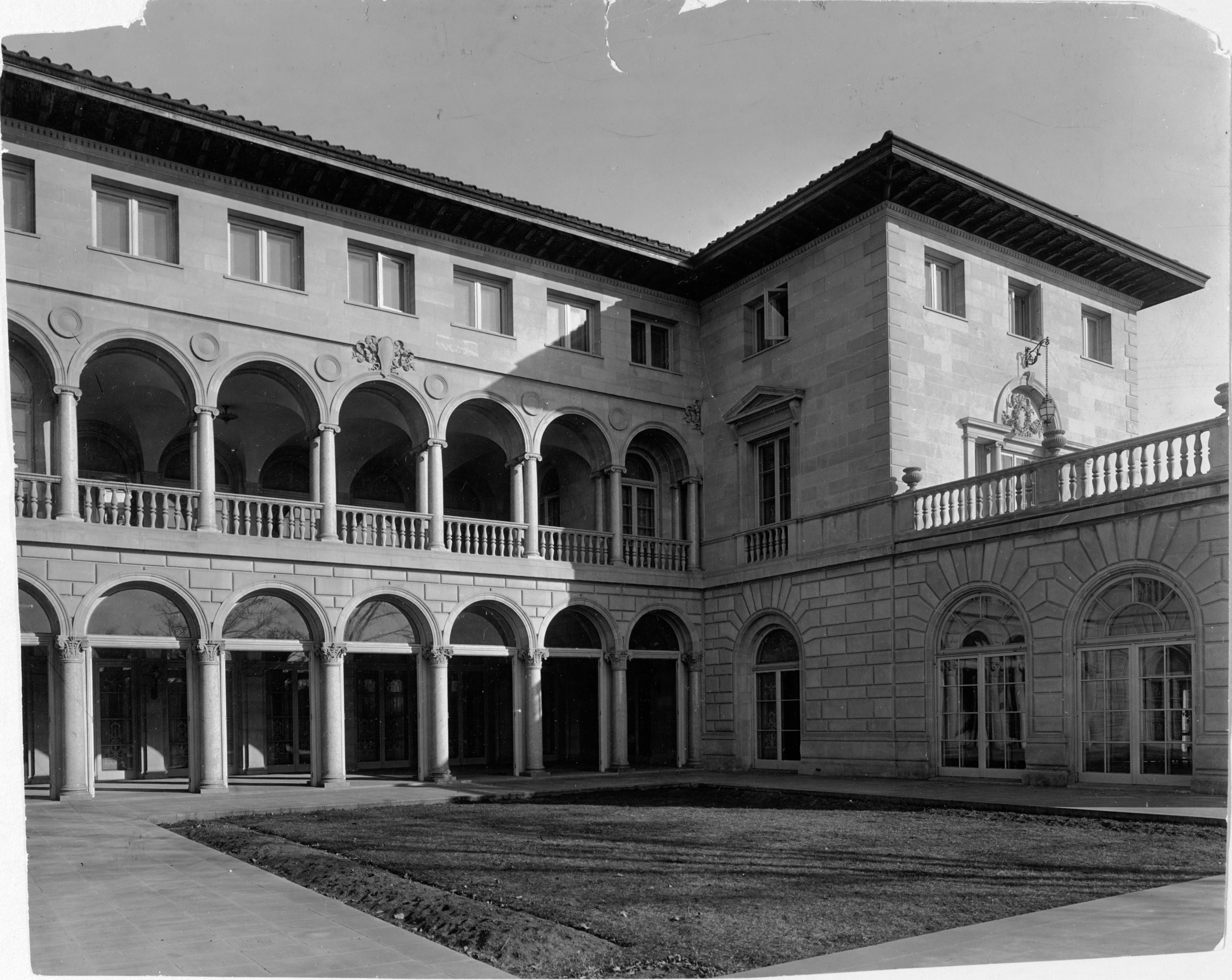
Charles Gilbert Gates mansion, first home in America to install air conditioning - Minneapolis, Minnesota

Charles Gilbert Gates (May 26, 1876 – October 29, 1913) of Minneapolis, Minnesota, was the owner of the first home in the United States where air conditioning was installed in 1914. He was the son of John Warne Gates, also known as "Bet-a-Million" Gates.

== Biography ==
Charles Gilbert Gates was the son of John Warne Gates, a manufacturer of barbed wire. In July 1913 he drove from his home in Minneapolis to New York City, where he had a seat on the New York Stock Exchange. He died in his sleep in Cody, Wyoming, in 1913. After his death his home was completed and was the first to have air conditioning installed.
