= Kansas City Southern Railway =

Class I freight railroad in the United States

- KCS system map (trackage rights in purple), including KCSM.

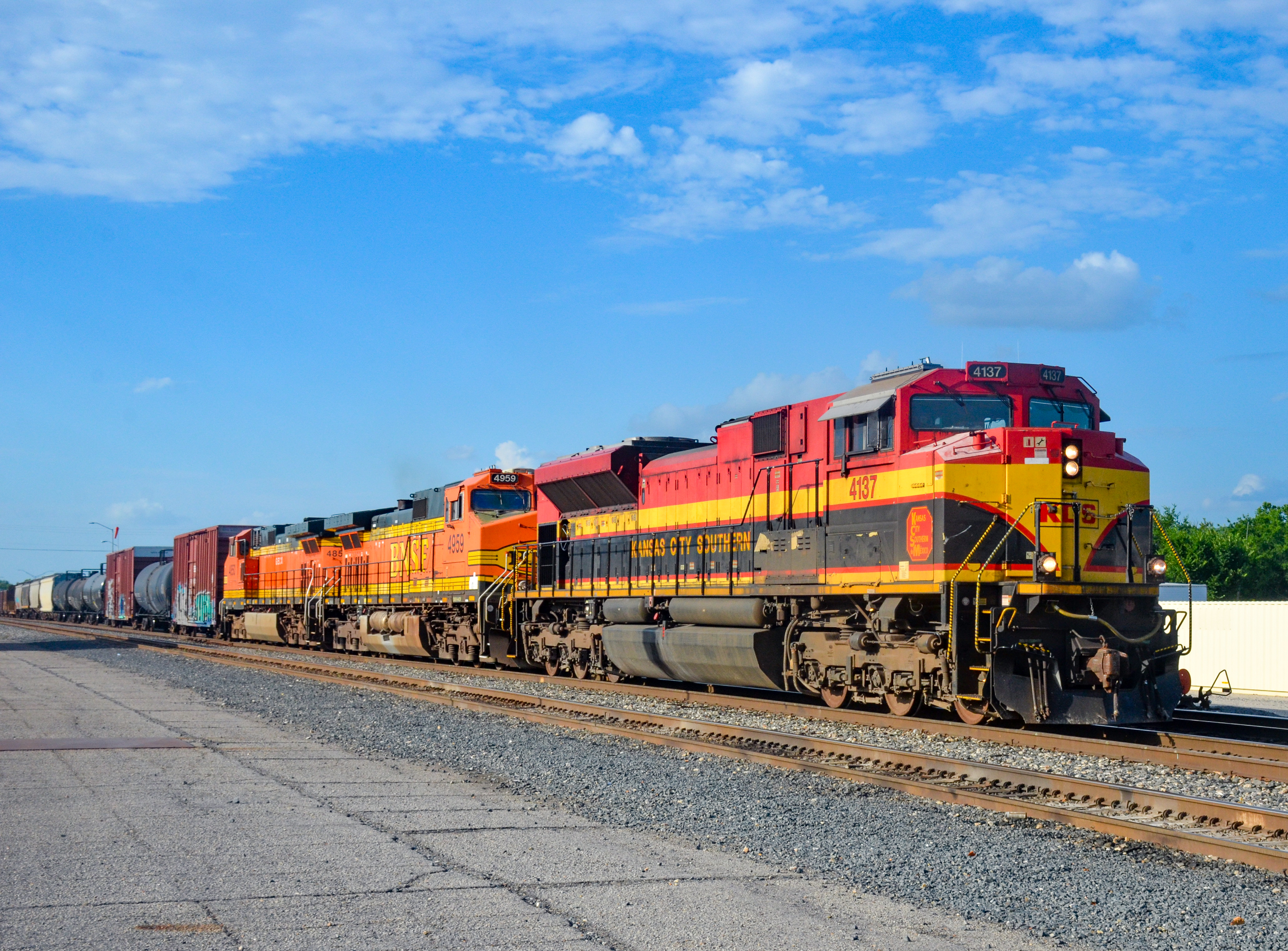
- A KCS train in Heavener, Oklahoma, led by no. 4137, an EMD SD70ACe.

Overview
- Parent company: CPKC
- Headquarters: Kansas City, Missouri
- Reporting mark: KCS
- Locale: Midwestern and Southeastern United States
- Founder: Arthur Stillwell
- Dates of operation: 1887–present
- Predecessor: Kansas City Suburban Belt Railroad; Kansas City, Pittsburg and Gulf Railroad

Technical
- Track gauge: 4 ft 8 1/2 in (1,435 mm) standard gauge
- Length: 3,984 miles (6,412 km)

Other
- Website: kcsouthern.com

The Kansas City Southern Railway Company (reporting mark KCS) is an American Class I railroad. Founded in 1887, it operated in 10 Midwestern and Southeastern U.S. states: Illinois, Missouri, Kansas, Oklahoma, Arkansas, Tennessee, Alabama, Mississippi, Louisiana and Texas. KCS owned the shortest north-south rail route between Kansas City, Missouri, and several key ports along the Gulf of Mexico.

The focus of the routes was the fastest way to connect Kansas City to seaports, since it was only 800 miles from Kansas City to the Gulf of Mexico compared to 1,400 miles between Kansas City and the Atlantic Ocean ports.

KCS operated over a railroad system consisting of 3,984 route miles (6,412 km) that extended south to the Mexico–United States border at which point another KCS-operated railroad, Kansas City Southern de México (KCSM), hauled freight into northeastern and central Mexico and to several Gulf of Mexico ports and the Pacific Port of Lázaro Cárdenas.

Canadian Pacific Railway purchased KCS in December 2021 for US$31 billion. On April 14, 2023, KCS became a wholly owned subsidiary of CPR, and both companies began conducting business under the name of their parent company, Canadian Pacific Kansas City.

== History ==
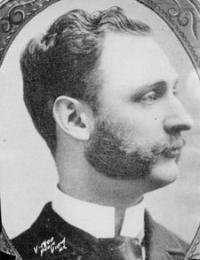
Arthur Stilwell, founder of KCS

=== Origins (1887–1900) ===
Arthur Stilwell began construction on the first line of what would eventually become the Kansas City Southern Railway in 1887, in suburban Kansas City, Mo. Together with Edward L. Martin, Stilwell built the Kansas City Suburban Belt Railway, a 20-mile long railroad, which was incorporated in 1887 and began operation in 1890.

In 1897, Stilwell completed the Kansas City, Pittsburg and Gulf Railroad Company (KCP&G) with a route running north and south from Kansas City to Shreveport, Louisiana, terminating at Port Arthur, Texas. In order to comply with Louisiana laws Stilwell, William S. Taylor, E. L. Martin, and others, officers of the Missouri, Kansas & Texas Trust Company of Kansas City, Missouri, as well as the KCP&G, incorporated the Kansas City, Shreveport & Gulf Railway Company (KCS&G) on September 27, 1894, to build or acquire railroads in Louisiana. The Arkansas Construction Company completed a 41.10-mile line from Arkansas-Louisiana State line (northern terminus with the Texarkana & Fort Smith Railway Company) to Shreveport on April 15, 1896. The Kansas City Terminal Construction Company completed a 76.40-mile Shreveport to Many line on October 26, 1896, an 85.80-mile Many to De Quincy line on June 30, 1897, and the 19.16-mile De Quincy to the Louisiana-Texas state line on September 11, 1897, where the southern terminus was with the Texarkana & Fort Smith Railway Company. A 26.60-mile narrow gauge branch line was acquired from the Calcasieu, Vernon & Shreveport Railway Company (CV&S), through the Arkansas Construction Company, that ran from De Quincy, West Lake, Lake Charles, and Lockport, and the construction company widened the tracks to standard gauge. In 1895, the KCP&G entered into a contract with the KCS&G to operate and maintain its property.

In 1900, KCP&G was taken over by the Kansas City Southern Railway Company (KCS).

By 1914, the KCS owned the separate entities of the Arkansas Western Railway Company, Fort Smith & Van Buren Railway Company, Kansas City, Shreveport & Gulf Railway Company, the Kansas City, Shreveport & Gulf Terminal Company, the Maywood & Sugar Creek Railway Company, the Port Arthur Canal & Dock Company, the Poteau Valley Railroad Company, the Texarkana & Fort Smith Railway Company, the Glenn Pool Tank Line Company, the Joplin Union Depot Company, the Kansas City Terminal Railway Company, and the K. C. S. Elevator Company.

=== 20th century (1900–2000) ===
In 1962, Kansas City Southern Industries, Inc. (KCSI) was established when the company began to diversify its interests into other industries. At that time, KCS became a subsidiary of KCSI. In 2002, KCSI formally changed its name to Kansas City Southern (KCS), with KCS remaining a subsidiary.

From 1940 to 1969, the Kansas City Southern operated two primary passenger trains, the Flying Crow (Trains #15 & 16) between Kansas City and Port Arthur (discontinued on May 11, 1968) and the Southern Belle (Trains #1 & 2) between Kansas City and New Orleans (discontinued on November 2, 1969). In 1995, a new Southern Belle was created as an executive train to entertain shippers and guests. It also pulls the Holiday Express train in December, making the rounds to several KCS cities and stations.

=== Access to Mexico ===
In 1995, led by the vision of CEO and President Michael Haverty to connect the Chicago corridor directly to Mexico, and for the regional KCS to become a large international railroad, the company acquired a 49% stake in the Texas Mexican Railway directly from the Mexican Government. At the time, the investment was considered questionable by some observers, because TM had no connection to KCSR. The solution would not come until 1996: as a result of the proposed merger between Union Pacific and Southern Pacific, KCS/TM made certain demands of the Surface Transportation Board (STB) for approval of the agreement. KCS/TM wanted trackage rights to enable it to connect the 380 mile distance from: Laredo, Texas, the crossing point of the TM into the United States; to Beaumont, Texas, the southern end junction of the KCS's main line to Port Arthur, Texas. KCS/TM further requested the right to buy the virtually abandoned 91 miles of the SP "Macaroni Line", from Rosenberg to Victoria.

In 1996, Kansas City Southern Industries won a Mexican government concession to operate the "Northeast Railroad," a potentially profitable 5,335-kilometer rail system connecting key cities and ports. This line, which carried a significant portion of Mexico's rail traffic and freight from the United States, was highly sought after due to its strategic location, including proximity to numerous auto assembly plants. The concession was operated by a new company known as Transportación Ferroviaria Mexicana (TFM), which was a joint venture of KCSI with Transportación Maritima Mexicana (TMM). In 2005, TMM sold its share of TFM to KCSI, prompting a rename to Kansas City Southern de México (KCSM).

Responding to increased international trade between the US and Mexico, the railroad built a large railroad yard and intermodal freight transport facility at Laredo in 1998. They also won Regional Railroad of the Year that same year.

In August 2004, KCS again purchased a controlling interest in Tex-Mex.

The Macaroni line laid dormant and unused for 11 years until 2006, when KCS/TM announced that they would rebuild the line to Class 1 standards, to avoid continued running on a circuitous UP monopolised route which required running through 120 miles of the Glidden Subdivision from Houston to Flatonia, along with an additional 88 miles through Cuero Sub from Flatonia to Placedo and Bloomington, where they KCS trains enter UP Angleton/Brownsville Subdivisions, heading to Robstown, Texas. Construction began in January 2009 and the line opened for the first trains for over 20 years, by June 2009. The line now operates daily trains, has CTC signaling, and an intermodal facility at Kendleton, Texas.

=== 21st century (2000–2023) ===
On March 21, 2021, the Canadian Pacific Railway (CP) announced that it was purchasing KCS for US$29 billion. Prior, a competing cash and stock offer was made by Canadian National Railway (CN) on April 20, 2021 at $33.7 billion. On May 13, 2021, KCS announced in a statement that they planned to accept the higher offer from CN, but would give CP until May 21 to come up with a higher bid, which was not made. However, CN's merger attempt would be blocked by a STB ruling in August 2021 that the company could not use a voting trust to assume control of KCS, due to concerns about potentially reduced competition in the railroad industry.

On September 12, 2021, KCS accepted a new $31 billion offer from CP. Though CP's offer was lower than the offer made by CN, the STB permitted CP to use a voting trust to take control of KCS. The voting trust allowed CP to become the beneficial owner of KCS in December 2021, but the two railroads operated independently until receiving approval for a merger of operations from the STB. That approval came on March 15, 2023, which permitted the railroads to merge as soon as April 14, 2023.

== Operations ==
KCS hauled freight for seven major government and business sectors: agriculture and minerals, military, automotive, chemical and petroleum, energy, industrial and consumer products and intermodal.

KCS had the shortest north-south rail route between Kansas City, Missouri, and several key ports along the Gulf of Mexico in Alabama, Louisiana, Mississippi and Texas. The KCS, along with the Union Pacific railroad, was one of only two Class I railroads based in the United States that has not originated as the result of a merger between previously separate companies.

The company owned or contracted with intermodal facilities along its rail network in Kansas City, MO; Jackson, Miss.; Wylie, Texas; Kendleton, Texas; and Laredo, Texas.

KCS operated over a railroad system consisting of 3,984 route miles (6,412 km) that extended south to the Mexico–United States border at which point another KCS railroad, Kansas City Southern de México (KCSM), can haul freight into northeastern and central Mexico and to the Gulf of Mexico ports of Tampico, Altamira, and Veracruz, as well as to the Pacific Port of Lázaro Cárdenas, fulfilling the vision of KCS founder Arthur Edward Stilwell.

== Corporate structure ==
Kansas City Southern Railway was owned by Kansas City Southern, known as Kansas City Southern Industries until 2002, which in turn also owned other companies like Kansas City Southern de México and the Panama Canal Railway's operator, Panama Canal Railway Company.

== Bibliography ==
- Kansas City Southern History (2008), History of the Kansas City Southern Railway. Retrieved July 7, 2008.
- "Kansas City Southern Color Pictorial", Steve Allen Goen, 1999
