= Kansas City, Pittsburg and Gulf Railroad =

American railroad company

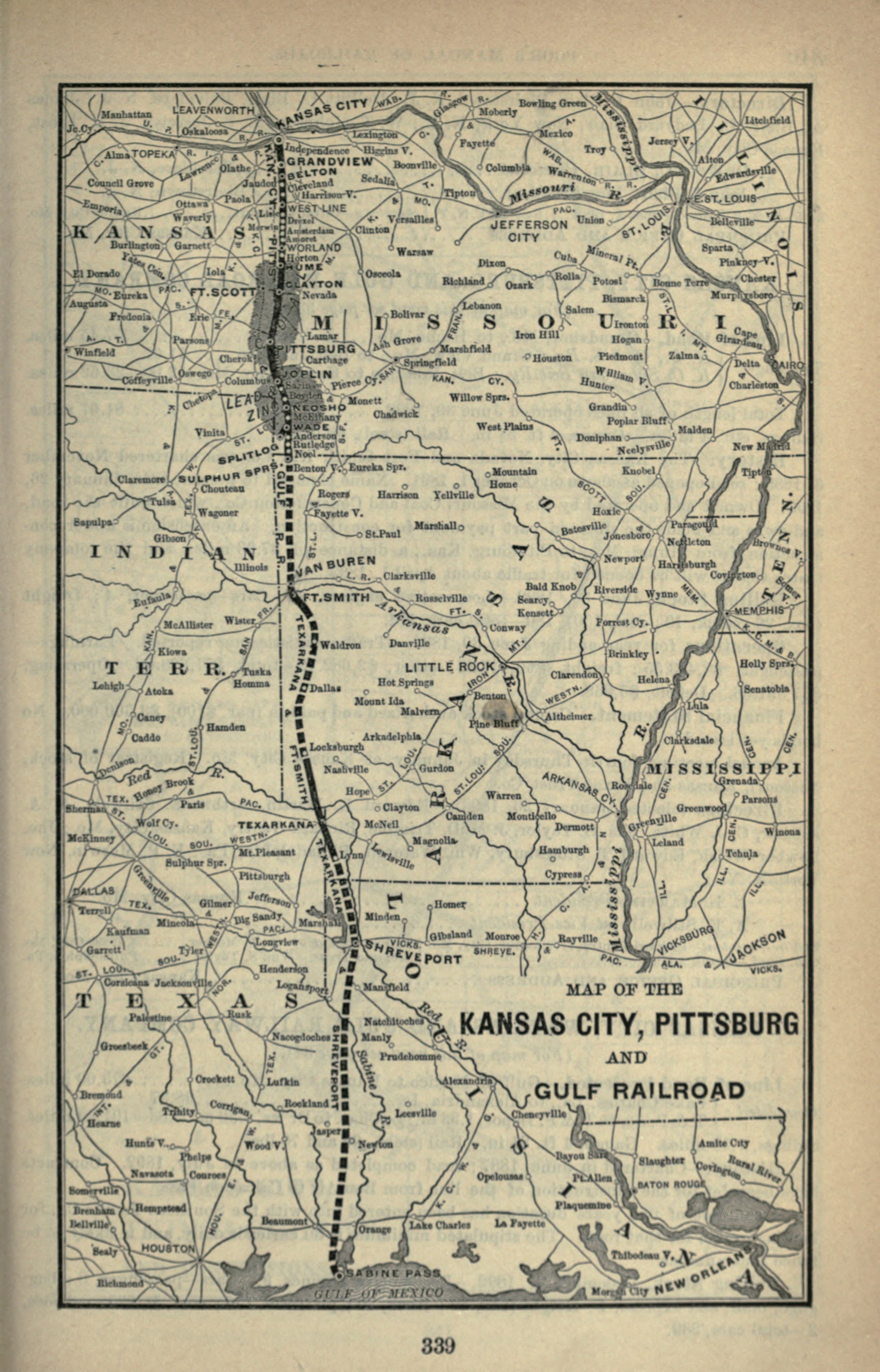
- Projected system map as of 1893; however, Sabine Pass was later discarded as the southern terminus.

Overview
- Headquarters: Kansas City, Missouri
- Locale: Missouri, Kansas, Oklahoma, and Texas
- Dates of operation: 1897–1900
- Predecessor: Kansas City Suburban Belt Railway
- Successor: Kansas City Southern Railway (now CPKC)

Technical
- Track gauge: 4 ft 8 1/2 in (1,435 mm) standard gauge

The Kansas City, Pittsburg and Gulf Railroad was a railway company that began operations in the 1890s and owned a main-line between Kansas City, Missouri, and Port Arthur, Texas. It was led by Arthur Stilwell before being thrown into receivership and eventually being absorbed by the Kansas City Southern Railway in 1900.

Trackage on the KCP&G was complete from Kansas City to Shreveport, Louisiana, as of March 2, 1897. By September 11 of that year, the line ran all the way to Port Arthur, Texas– a town Stilwell essentially created and named after himself. However, the railroad was in financial trouble by 1899. On April 1, 1900, the Kansas City Southern Railway took control of the KCP&G properties after purchasing them at a foreclosure sale in Joplin, Missouri.

The section of the line within the boundaries of Louisiana was chartered as the Kansas City, Shreveport & Gulf Railway Company (KCS&G).
