= Kansas City Southern (company) =

Former American railroad holding company

- Company type: Public
- Traded as: NYSE: KSU
- Founded: 1887
- Defunct: April 14, 2023
- Fate: Acquired by Canadian Pacific Railway, merged into Canadian Pacific Kansas City
- Successor: CPKC
- Headquarters: Kansas City, Missouri, U.S.
- Key people: Patrick J. Ottensmeyer (CEO & President)
- Revenue: US$3.37 billion (2022)
- Operating income: US$1.23 billion (2022)
- Net income: US$0.98 billion (2022)
- Total assets: US$10.68 billion (2022)
- Total equity: US$4.80 billion (2022)
- Number of employees: 7,190 (2022)
- Parent: Canadian Pacific Kansas City
- Subsidiaries: Kansas City Southern Railway; Kansas City Southern de Mexico; Texas Mexican Railway; Meridian Speedway (70%); Panama Canal Railway (50%); Terminal del Centro de México (45%); Ferrovalle (25%)
- Website: kcsouthern.com
- Footnotes / references Financials as of December 31, 2022. References

Kansas City Southern (KCS) was a transportation holding company with railroad investments in the United States, Mexico, and Panama and operated from 1887 to 2023. The KCS rail network included about 7,299 miles (11,747 km) of track in the U.S. and Mexico.

KCS network map (trackage rights in purple)

Its primary U.S. holding was the Kansas City Southern Railway (KCS), a Class I railroad that operated about 3,984 route miles (6,412 km) in 10 states in the midwestern and southeastern United States. KCS's hubs included Kansas City, Missouri; Shreveport, Louisiana; New Orleans; Dallas; and Houston. Among Class I railroads, KCS had the shortest route between Kansas City, the second-largest rail hub in the country, and the Gulf of Mexico. Its primary international holding was Kansas City Southern de México (KCSM), which operated about 3,315 route miles (5,335 km) in 15 states in northeastern, central, southeast-central and southwest-central Mexico. KCSM reached the Gulf of Mexico ports of Tampico, Altamira, and Veracruz, and the Pacific Ocean deepwater container port of Lázaro Cárdenas. KCS obtained 100% ownership of KCSM in 2005, making KCS the only U.S. Class I Railroad to own track in Mexico.

The company also owned half of the Panama Canal Railway Company (PCRC), which operates the Panama Canal Railway, providing ocean-to-ocean transshipment service between the Atlantic and Pacific oceans. The 47.6-mile (76.6 km) railroad served as an intermodal line for world commerce and complemented the Canal, the Colón Free Trade Zone, and the Pacific and Atlantic ports. As of 2009, PCRC's wholly owned subsidiary, Panarail Tourism, offered passenger service for business commuters, tourists, and private charters.

Beginning in 2021, KCS became the subject of a bidding war between Canadian National Railway and Canadian Pacific Railway. Canadian Pacific (CP) emerged as the winner. CP then sought a merger, which was approved by the US Surface Transportation Board on March 15, 2023, and the combined "Canadian Pacific Kansas City Limited" was created on April 14, 2023. The combined company forms the only railroad serving all of the countries in the North American trade zone (Canada, Mexico, and the United States).

== History ==
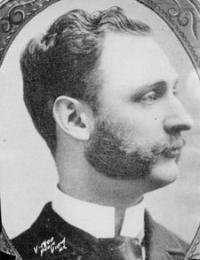
Arthur Stilwell, founder of KCS

In 1887, Arthur Edward Stilwell and Edward L. Martin began construction on and incorporated the Kansas City Suburban Belt Railway in suburban Kansas City, Missouri. Beginning operations in 1890, the railroad served the Argentine District in Kansas City, Kansas; Independence, Missouri; and the riverside commercial and industrial districts of Kansas City.

While the Belt Railway was a success, Stilwell had a much bigger dream. Over the ensuing decade, the line grew through construction and acquisition of other roads, such as the Texarkana and Fort Smith Railway, to become a through route between Kansas City and Port Arthur, Texas. With the final spike being driven north of Beaumont, Texas, on September 11, 1897, the Kansas City, Pittsburg and Gulf Railroad Company (KCP&G) was completed. In 1900, KCP&G became The Kansas City Southern Railway Company (KCS). In 1939, KCS acquired the Louisiana and Arkansas Railway (L&A), providing a route extending from Dallas to New Orleans, via Shreveport, Louisiana.

In 1962, KCS reorganized as a holding company, Kansas City Southern Industries, Inc. (KCSI), as it began to diversify its interests into other industries under the CEO William Deramus III. The new KCSI focused primarily on the financial industry, along with the rail industry. In 1969, KCSI started the two largest companies that came out of the diversification: DST Systems and Janus Capital Group, which was known as Stilwell Financial at the time. DST Systems is a software development firm that specializes in information processing and management, with the goal of improving efficiency, productivity, and customer service. Janus Capital Group is a finance firm that provides growth and risk-managed investment strategies.

=== Expansion in the 1990s ===
The core KCSI rail system changed little until the 1990s, when the purchase of MidSouth Rail extended KCSI's reach east from Shreveport into Mississippi and Alabama. Combined with existing KCSI routes, this created an east-west mainline marketed as the Meridian Speedway. Another acquisition, the Gateway Western Railway, extended KCS's reach from Kansas City to St. Louis, Missouri, and Springfield, Illinois.

The 1990s also saw KCSI expand into Mexico with the acquisition of partial interests in the Texas Mexican Railway (TM) and Grupo Transportación Ferroviaria Mexicana (TFM). TFM was created when KCSI and Transportacion Maritima Mexicana (TMM) purchased a government concession to operate a rail system in Mexico. The concession was also bid on by many other major companies, including the United States' largest railroad, Union Pacific Railroad. KCSI and TMM bid on, and won, the concession for $1.4 billion USD, paying 49% and 51%, respectively. TMM already partially owned the Texas Mexican Railway through a previous concession from the Mexican government. TM was particularly important to KCSI because they held the link from KCSI tracks to TFM tracks via trackage rights over the Union Pacific line.

Shortly after acquiring the Mexican government's concession, KCSI entered into another joint venture to purchase a government concession. On June 19, 1998, the government of Panama turned over control of the Panama Canal Railway to Kansas City Southern Railroad and the privately held Lanigan Holdings, LLC. This created the Panama Canal Railway Company (PCRC).

After these large capital outputs, KCSI needed new money to improve the Mexican and Panamanian concessions they had purchased, and to continue to make capital expenditures in the future. To fund these efforts, KCSI spun off all assets that were not essential to the rail businesses. Doing this essentially paid off the purchase of their two existing concessions and freed up money to improve them. The first major improvement that took place was in 2000 and 2001 when the PCRC upgraded the railway to handle large, intermodal shipping containers, along with passenger transport.

In 2002, the Kansas City Southern Industries formally changed its name to Kansas City Southern (KCS) after spinning off many subsidiary businesses that were not directly related to the railroad business (the largest of which were Janus Capital Group and DST Systems). In 2005, Kansas City Southern purchased TMM's share in TFM and TM, giving them full ownership of the companies. TFM was officially renamed Kansas City Southern de México, S.A. de C.V. The Texas Mexican Railway retained its original name and is a subsidiary of KCS.

In June 2009, the Kansas City Southern began operating on new trackage between Victoria and Rosenberg, Texas, known as the Macaroni Line.

Patrick J. Ottensmeyer was named President in April 2015 and CEO in June 2016, succeeding David Starling. Ottensmeyer had served as Executive Vice President of Sales and Marketing and Chief Financial Officer. He was named Railroader of the Year by Railway Age for 2020.

In September 2020, the company rejected takeover offers from Global Infrastructure Partners that ranged up to $23 billion; the final offer valued the company at a 17% premium over its share high in February 2020 despite the COVID-19 pandemic.

=== Merger with Canadian Pacific Railway ===
In March 2021, Calgary-based Canadian Pacific Railway offered over $25 billion to purchase KCS. The purchase would allow the Canadian company to create the first rail network connecting the United States, Mexico and Canada. However, in May 2021, Canadian National Railway announced a superior bid to CP's, which KCS management later agreed to support. In August 2021, CP announced an increased bid that, while still less than CN's bid, was claimed by CP to have a greater chance of regulatory approval. While KCS's board agreed to CN's bid, shareholder and regulatory approvals were still required; on August 31, the US Surface Transportation Board (STB) denied a voting trust between CN and KCS.

With the decision by the STB, KCS re-engaged with CP on CP's original offer. On September 15, KCS confirmed that it had terminated its agreement with CN and would support CP's revised offer. Kansas City Southern's shareholders voted to approve the merger on December 10, 2021. The transaction closed in early 2022, following which KCS was held in a previously approved voting trust pending approval by the STB; the combined company was to be named Canadian Pacific Kansas City (CPKC). The combined "Canadian Pacific Kansas City Limited" would form the first railroad serving all of the countries in the North American trade zone (Canada, Mexico and the United States).

On March 15, 2023, the STB approved the merger between the two companies, which was completed on April 14, 2023.

== Subsidiaries ==
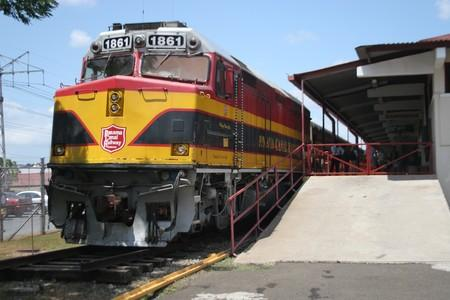
A Panama Canal Railway locomotive sits in a station at Colón, Panama

In addition to KCS, KCSM and PCRC, Kansas City Southern’s subsidiaries include:

- Gateway Eastern Railway Company (GWWE) is a wholly owned subsidiary of KCS. GWWE provides rail service over about 17 miles (27 km) of track in the East St. Louis, Illinois, area.
- Meridian Speedway, LLC (MSLLC) is a majority-owned, consolidated subsidiary that owns the former KCS rail line between Meridian, Mississippi and Shreveport, Louisiana, which is a portion of the KCS rail route between Dallas and Meridian, and is known as the "Meridian Speedway." Norfolk Southern Corporation (NS), through its wholly owned subsidiary, the Alabama Great Southern Railroad, owns a minority interest in MSLLC.
- Southern Capital, Development, and Industrial Services Companies: The Southern Capital company consists of bulk storage facilities complete with ocean terminals (Pabtex) along with a tie and timber plant (Trans-Serve, Inc., also known as Superior Tie and Timber). The Southern Development Company is a holding company that owns various properties. The Southern Capital Corporation, LLC is a leasing company owned jointly by KCS and GATX Capital Corporation of San Francisco, California, Southern Capital Corporation has the rail assets that once belonged to Carland and KCS, as well as the loan portfolio once owned by Southern Leasing Corporation.
- The Texas Mexican Railway Company (TexMex) is wholly owned by KCS. TexMex consists of a 157-mile (253 km) railway that connects Corpus Christi, Texas to Laredo, Texas. TexMex also owns 400 miles (640 km) of Union Pacific trackage rights that spans from Beaumont, Texas to Robstown, Texas. With its trackage rights and physical railway, the Texas Mexican Railway connects KCSM and KCS at Laredo and Beaumont. TexMex also owns the Texas Mexican Railway International Bridge. It is the only rail bridge that connects the United States with Mexico through Laredo, and 40% of all rail traffic that travels to Mexico crosses over this bridge. Without TexMex, it would be nearly impossible for KCS and KCSM to act as a single company under Kansas City Southern.
- KCS also owns a handful of non-core businesses. These minor subsidiaries, holding companies or minority investments (investments in which KCS has less than 50 percent ownership), have few employees and serve to support the rail operation. These include Canama Transportation, Caymex Transportation, Inc., Rosenberg Regional LLC, Joplin Union Depot, Kansas City Terminal Railway, Port Arthur Bulk Marine Terminal Co. and Veals, Inc.

== Company officers ==
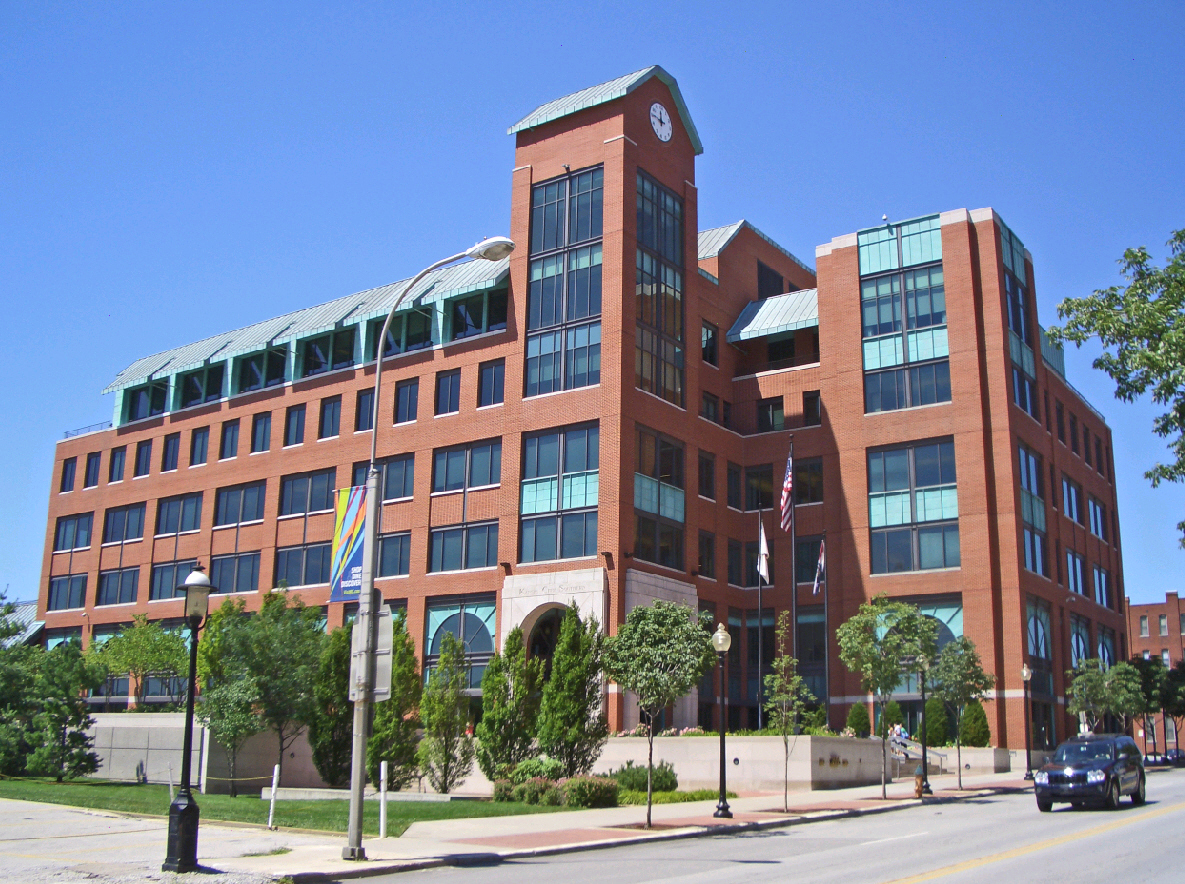
KCS Headquarters Kansas City, Missouri

The following is a list of the executives heading KCS since 1889.

- Edward L. Martin (1889–1897)
- Arthur Stilwell (1897–1900)
- Samuel W. "Colonel" Fordyce (1900)
- Stuart R. Knott (1900–1905)
- Job A. Edson (1905–1918)
- Leonor F. Loree (1918–1920)
- Job A. Edson (1920–1927)
- Charles E. Johnston (1928–1938)
- Harvey C. Couch (1939)
- C.P. "Pete" Couch (1939–1941)
- William N. Deramus, Jr. (1941–1961)
- William N. Deramus III (1961–1973)
- Thomas S. Carter (1973–1986)
- William N. Deramus IV (1986–1990)
- Landon H. Rowland (1990–1991)
- George W. Edwards (1991–1995)
- Michael R. Haverty (1995–2010)
- Arthur Shoener (2005-2008)
- David L. Starling (2008–2016)
- Patrick J Ottensmeyer (2015–2023)

== See also ==
- Kansas City Southern de México
- Kansas City Southern Railway
- Kansas City Terminal Railway
- List of cities served by Kansas City Southern
- List of United States railroads
- Panama Canal Railway
