= William N. Deramus =

William N. Deramus may refer to:

- William N. Deramus Jr. (1888–1965), American railroad executive
- William N. Deramus III (1915–1989), American railroad executive
- William N. Deramus IV (born 1944), president of Kansas City Southern Railway
