= C. P. Couch =

Charles Peter "Pete" Couch (August 16, 1890 – June 5, 1955) succeeded his brother Harvey C. Couch as president of Kansas City Southern Railway on August 11, 1939.

== Biography ==
Pete Couch was born in Calhoun, a tiny community in south Arkansas' Columbia County. One of six children of Tom and Mamie Heard Couch, he was initially raised on a small cotton farm. His father was also an itinerant Methodist minister. When Pete was around age 3, his father's health deteriorated, and the family moved to nearby Magnolia, the seat of Columbia County.

Pete Couch led a crew that raised utility poles for Harvey Couch's new telephone lines in northern Louisiana. Years later, Pete Couch was president of the Louisiana and Arkansas Railway, prior to becoming Kansas City Southern president.

Business positions
| Preceded by Harvey C. Couch | President of Kansas City Southern Railway; 1939 – 1941 | Succeeded by William N. Deramus, Jr. |
