= Baldwin, Harrison County, Texas =

Ghost town in Texas, US

Baldwin
- Ghost town
- Location in Texas
- Coordinates: 32.7059768°N 94.2343556°W
- Country: United States
- State: Texas
- County: Harrison
- Elevation: 203 ft (62 m)

Baldwin is a ghost town in Harrison County, Texas, United States. Situated along the Louisiana and Arkansas Railway, the family of J. B. Baldwin is its namesake. From 1902 to 1915, a post office operated in the community. It peaked in the 1910s, with a population of 350, but declined to 25 during and after the Great Depression and was abandoned in the 20th century.
