= Harvey C. Couch School =

- U.S. National Register of Historic Places
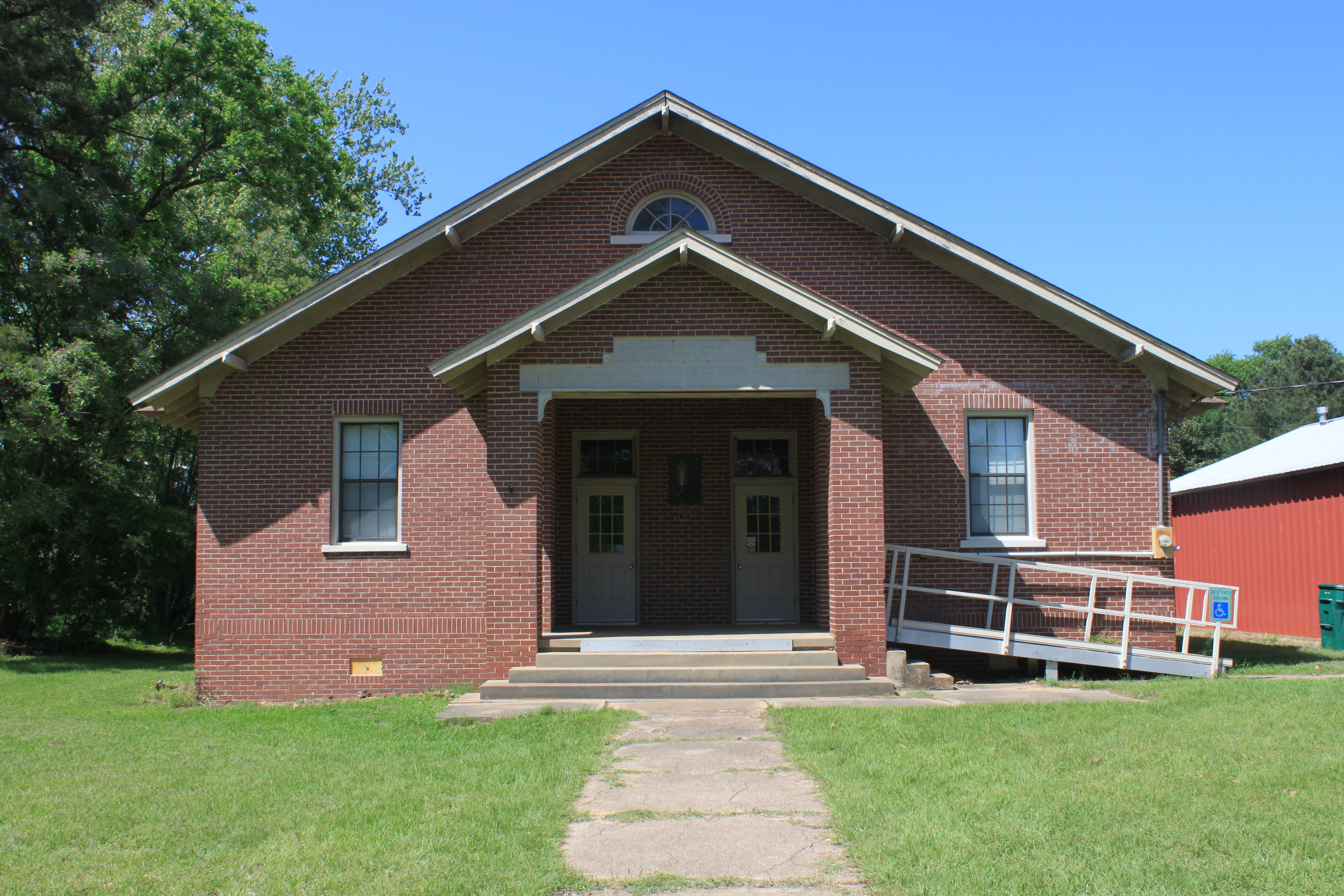

- Location within Arkansas Location within the United States
- Location: NE of jct. of Co. Rd. 11 (Calhoun Rd.) and Co. Rd. 25, Calhoun, Columbia County, Arkansas
- Coordinates: 33°13′12″N 93°9′12″W
- Area: 1 acre (0.40 ha)
- Built: 1928
- Built by: Guy Wilson, F.M. Powell
- Architect: Richard Curzon
- Architectural style: Bungalow/American craftsman
- NRHP reference No.: 93000482
- Added to NRHP: June 8, 1993

The Harvey C. Couch School is a historic school building at the junction of County Roads 11 and 25 in rural Columbia County, Arkansas, several miles southeast of the county seat, Magnolia, in the hamlet of Calhoun. The school is a single-story brick structure whose main block has a hip roof. Projecting from the main block are an open porch on its front, and three concrete staircases on its other elevations. The front porch shelters a double-door entry under a gable roof, and features Craftsman-style brackets. The building was built in 1928 as a gift to the community of Calhoun by its native son, Arkansas businessman Harvey C. Couch.

The building was listed on the National Register of Historic Places in 1993.

== See also ==
- National Register of Historic Places listings in Columbia County, Arkansas
