= Newcomen Society of the United States =

American entrepreneurship history organization (1923–2007)

The Newcomen Society of the United States
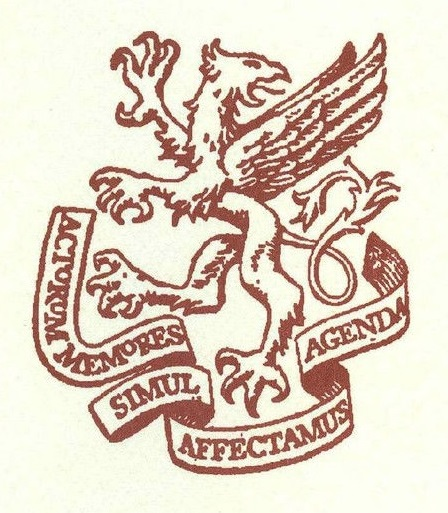
- Formation: 1923
- Dissolved: 2007
- Legal status: defunct
- Purpose: Business and industrial history
- Headquarters: Exton, PA
- Formerly called: The Newcomen Society in North America

The Newcomen Society of the United States was a non-profit educational foundation for "the study and recognition of achievement in American business and the society it serves", active between 1923 and 2007. It was responsible for more than 1,600 individual histories of organizations, from corporations to colleges, which were distributed to libraries and its membership.

== English origins ==
It was patterned after the Newcomen Society of Great Britain, founded in London in 1920, a learned society formed to foster the study of the history of engineering and technology. Both groups took their name from Thomas Newcomen (1663-1729), the British industrial pioneer whose invention of the atmospheric steam engine in 1712 led to the first practical use of such a device: lifting water out of mines. Newcomen's invention helped facilitate the birth of the Industrial Revolution. He is frequently referred to as the "Father of the Industrial Revolution."

== The Newcomen Society in North America ==
The Newcomen Society of the United States began as The Newcomen Society in North America, founded in New York City in 1923 by Leonor F. Loree, then dean of American railroad presidents, together with a group of other prominent business leaders. The original members were nominated from leaders in business, industry, education, the military, and other professions. Its declaration of purpose was to:

- Preserve, protect, and promote the American free enterprise system.
- Honor corporate entities and other organizations that contribute to or are examples of success attained under free enterprise, and to recognize contributions to that system.
- Publish and record the histories and achievements of such enterprises and organizations.
- Encourage and stimulate original research and writing in the field of business history through a program of academic awards, grants, and fellowships.

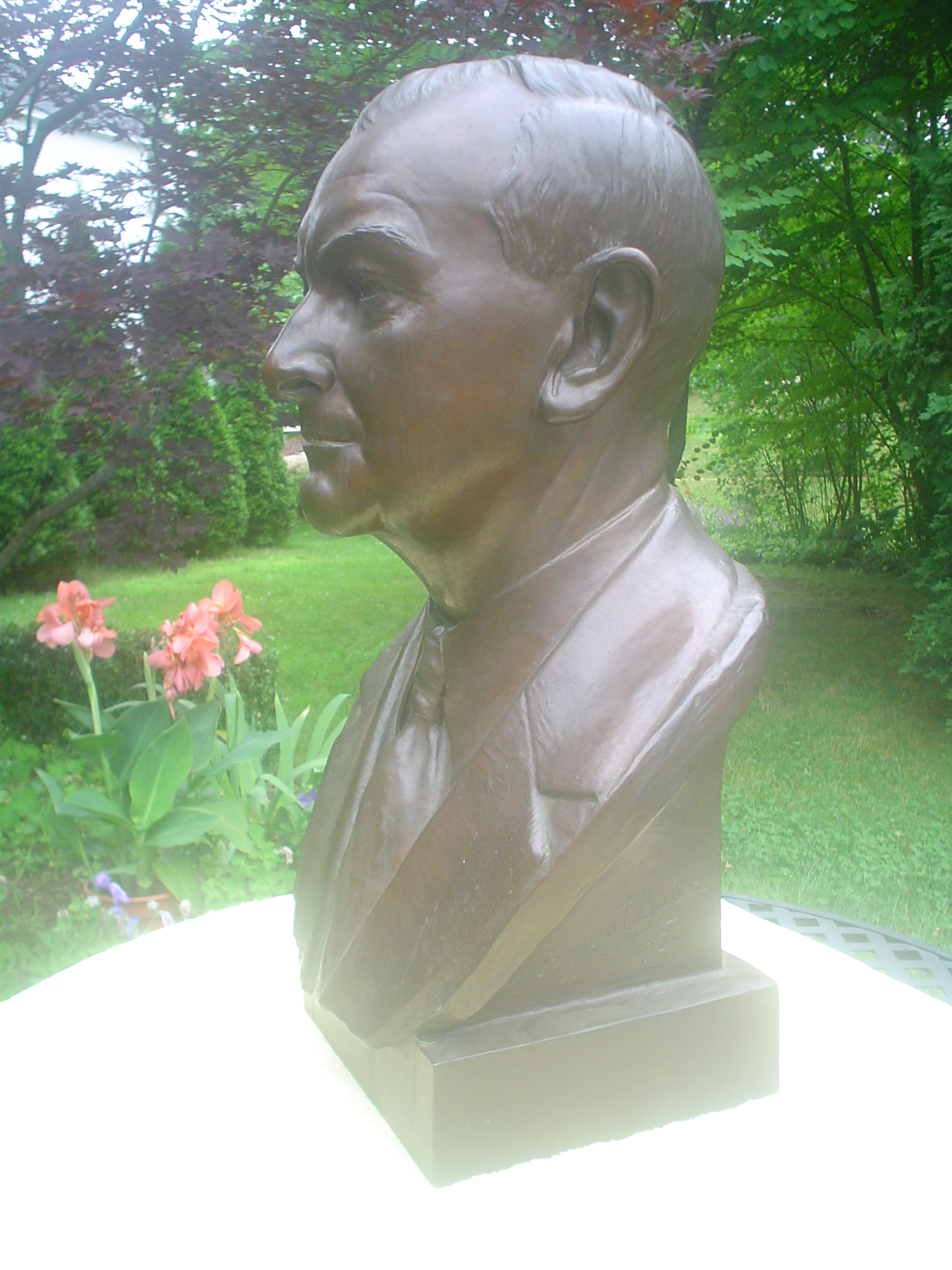
Charles Penrose, 1956, bronze bust by Bryant Baker

Established soon after the ascent of communism in the Soviet Union, The Newcomen Society in North America championed American capitalism, material civilization, and entrepreneurship. But the English and American branches together counted only 323 members in 1933, the year leadership for The Newcomen Society in North America went to its co-founder and Loree's friend, Charles Penrose, Sr. (1886–1958). A 1907 graduate of Princeton University with a career in engineering, Penrose found a new calling at Newcomen. Declining a salary, he became senior vice president when the presidency was largely honorary, and under his dynamic governance, the society achieved stature and prestige. He started sectional committees and aggressively recruited as members industrialists, educators, bankers, and businessmen. Membership soared to 12,000, while the British chapter numbered less than 500.

In the late 1940s, Penrose built the society's headquarters on Newcomen Road in rural Exton, Pennsylvania, complete with a 2,700 volume library and museum, featuring a range of antique model steam engines operated by hand cranking or electricity. Beside a chapel stood a belltower that played a carillon. Designed by the Philadelphia architect Briton Martin (1899–1983), the campus had offices, guest houses, and a printing shop for Newcomen Publications, Inc., which Penrose founded to produce the society's corporate and academic histories, distinctive booklets illustrated with a mix of commissioned and antique engravings. At Seapoint Beach in Kittery Point, Maine, the society maintained a summer retreat with guest cottages in Tudor style.

Penrose appeared to know personally the top executives of every major company in the United States, and by charisma and will, made Newcomen an important part of their lives. Called a "benevolent despot," he oversaw every detail on the society's production line of tributes to organizations, from editing and publishing an average of 55 booklet histories per year, to officiating across the country at 60–70 luncheons and dinners annually, at which the histories were orated by their authors. Except for educators, expenses were usually paid by the enterprises being honored, which bought for distribution over 12,000 copies to enhance their reputations. It is no exaggeration to say that, in its heyday, anyone who was anyone in American commerce, manufacturing, and academia belonged to The Newcomen Society in North America. In 1952, Time Magazine referred to Penrose as "a combination of P. T. Barnum and the Archbishop of Canterbury." It quoted him saying:

"We are attempting to hold up to America the vision and the courage and the hard work and abiding faith — make that a capital F — of the men who years ago created the America which we have inherited."

Reluctant to slow down with age, Charles Penrose, Sr. died suddenly in 1958, the year he finally became president. The chairmanship next went to his son, Charles Penrose, Jr. (1921–2007). By 1981, The Newcomen Society in North America had 17,000 members.

== Decline and closure ==
Following the retirement of Charles Penrose, Jr., membership declined during the stewardship of his successors. Despite its mandate to promote engineering and technology, Newcomen maintained clubby rituals that seemed dated in the age of the internet and video conferencing. Newcomen sold the Exton campus and its sumptuous furnishings. Its collection of antique model engines was auctioned by Christie's in 2001. On December 17, 2007, Chairman Daniel V. Malloy and the trustees announced that The Newcomen Society of the United States would close. Over its 84–85 year existence, it honored more than 2,500 organizations and institutions. The archive of Newcomen Society histories is preserved at The National Museum of Industrial History in Bethlehem, Pennsylvania. In 2008, the sole active chapter incorporated itself as the Newcomen Society of Alabama. As of May 2025 its web site had expired and an archived image from the previous December showed no updates since 2021.
