= Landon H. Rowland =

- Born: May 20, 1937; Fuquay Springs, North Carolina, U.S.
- Died: December 28, 2015 (aged 78); Kansas City, Missouri, U.S.
- Education: Dartmouth College; Harvard Law School (JD)
- Occupations: Railroad executive, philanthropist
- Spouse: Sarah Fidler (m. 1959)
- Children: 3

Landon Hill Rowland (May 20, 1937 – December 28, 2015) was the fifteenth president of Kansas City Southern Railway and a Kansas City philanthropist.

As a child, his family moved to Portsmouth, Virginia, during World War II, then to Wilmington, Delaware, when he was 13, after his father died. He started working after school around this time, which would impact his life in two important ways: he was exposed to the asbestos that ultimately would cause his death from cancer, but his family's struggles also gave him the drive to succeed and to be able to take care of others.

Rowland graduated from Dartmouth College with a degree in English Literature, then from Harvard Law School with a JD in 1962. He married the former Sarah Fidler in 1959, and they had three children survive infancy: Liza, Matthew, and Joshua.

Rowland died on December 28, 2015, aged 78.

== Professional life ==
Rowland joined Watson Ess Marshall and Engass upon graduation, leaving in 1980 to join Kansas City Southern Industries (KCSI). He was promoted to President and COO of KCSI in 1983, then served as CEO starting in 1987, retiring as Chairman in 2004. To help the railroad maintain its independence, he was part of the push to diversify the company into the less capital-intensive fields of finance— including the acquisition of Janus in 1984—and technology—with the establishment of DST as a division to automate mutual fund record keeping. These entities became so successful that between 1995 and 2003, Rowland oversaw splitting KCSI into three public companies: Kansas City Southern (railroad), Janus Capital Group (mutual fund), and DST Systems (financial technology).

Rowland continued to build the KCS railway, acquiring four railways and pursuing the acquisition of Mexican railways starting in the early 1990s (before NAFTA in 1994). Despite Mexican government churn, Rowland pushed to maintain involvement, finally culminating in KCS's acquisition of the "premier rail line in Mexico" in 2005. His CEO predecessor, Irvine Hockaday Jr., later noted that "[Rowland] and the leadership of the railroad subsidiary solidified the future of that railroad by its extension into Mexico, which in turn stabilized the future of Kansas City Southern to the benefit of the city."

In 2005, after his retirement from KCS, Rowland and his wife Sarah purchased a small Garden City, Missouri, bank, which later became Lead Bank. As of 2019, Sarah Rowland served as Lead Bank's Board Chairman, while their son, Joshua C. Rowland, served as CEO and Vice Chairman.

At the time of his death, Rowland was serving as Director and Chairman Emeritus of Janus Capital Group. Rowland was also a Trustee of CED (Committee of Economic Development) where he was given a CED 2011 Distinguished Performance Award. Rowland was a panel presenter in a CED forum called "Hidden Money: The Need for Transparency in Political Finance".

== Community involvement ==
Rowland was Board Chairman of the Swope Ridge Geriatric Center for 25 years. He also chaired the Local Investment Commission (LINC) from 1995–2014. Regarding his generosity, longtime former executive director of Swope Ridge, Dorothy Fauntleroy, stated, "He is one of the most charitable, kind and sensitive human beings I've ever known, but he wants to be anonymous... People do not know the depth of his giving to the needy and disadvantaged." In discussing his own involvement in social services work, Rowland insisted, "It is so much easier to go out and raise money for our own special interests... I want to find the process - and help with the process - that bridges the gaps and helps us look beyond the temptation to go our separate ways. That is a task for any citizen, anywhere in the country. It is not limited to Kansas City."

Landon and Sarah Rowland have been arts supporters and patrons, including Rowland's leadership roles in the Lyric Opera and the Metropolitan Performing Arts fund, as well support for the Kansas City Ballet, the Kansas City Symphony, the Harriman-Jewell Series, and the Friends of Chamber Music. They have also been great supporters of the Nelson-Atkins Museum of Art, including the 2002 creation of the Ever Glades Fund for American Art. Rowland was involved with the founding of the Negro Leagues Baseball Museum (working with baseball legend Buck O'Neill), and served in leadership roles with the Linda Hall Library, the Liberty Memorial Association, and the National World War I Museum. He was also involved nationally in the Committee for Economic Development and Business Executives for National Security.

As part of his involvement in LINC, Rowland was involved in the sale of Kansas City's charity care hospitals to HCA Midwest Health, with the sale proceeds going to a foundation to provide health care access to the disadvantaged in Kansas City. After HCA fell short of its commitments, Rowland pushed for the Health Care Foundation to sue HCA, resulting in a $433 million award (later settled at $175 million).

Landon and Sarah Rowland bought a historic farm ("Ever Glades Farm") in Clay County, Missouri, in 1986, where they have pursued Sarah's interest in breeding and raising American Saddlebred Horses. Through their involvement, Landon became Chairman and a lifetime director of the American Royal.

Business positions
| Preceded by William N. Deramus IV | President of Kansas City Southern Railway; 1990 – 1991 | Succeeded by George W. Edwards |
