= WOK =

Radio station in Pine Bluff, Arkansas (1922–1924)

WOK was a short-lived American AM radio station, located in Pine Bluff, Arkansas. First licensed on February 16, 1922, it was the first broadcasting station authorized in the state. It was deleted in June 1924.

== History ==
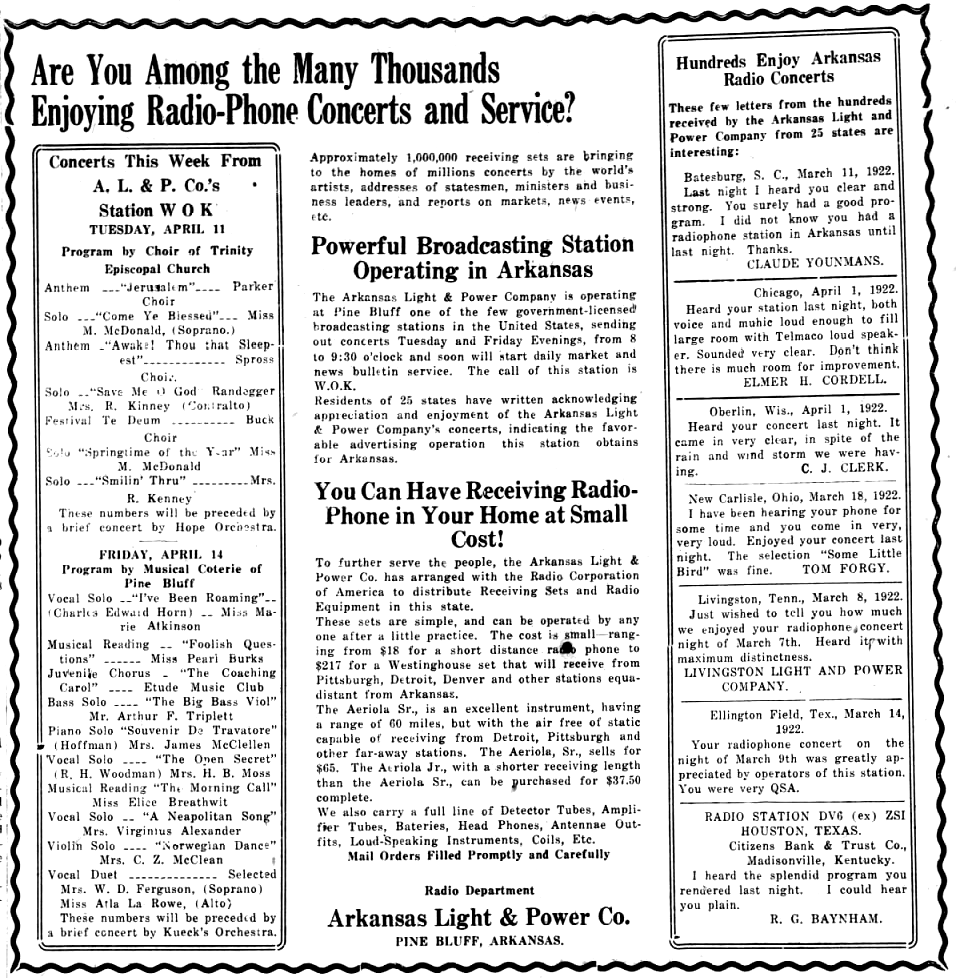
April 9, 1922 station advertisement.

The US Department of Commerce regulated radio stations in the United States from 1912 until the 1927 formation of the Federal Radio Commission. Originally there were no restrictions on which radio stations could make broadcasts intended for the general public. However, effective December 1, 1921, a regulation was adopted limiting broadcasting to stations operating under a Limited Commercial license that authorized operation on designated wavelengths of 360 meters (833 kHz) for "entertainment", and 485 meters (619 kHz) for "market and weather reports".

WOK was first authorized on February 16, 1922, to the Pine Bluff Company in Pine Bluff, for operation on the 360 meter "entertainment" wavelength. The call sign was randomly issued from a list of available call letters, and the station adopted the slogan "Worker of Kilowatts". Currently most stations west of the Mississippi River have call letters beginning with "K". However, prior to the January 1923 establishment of the Mississippi River as the boundary, call letters beginning with "W" were generally assigned to stations east of an irregular line formed by the western state borders from North Dakota south to Texas, with calls beginning with "K" going only to stations in states west of that line. Because there was only a single "entertainment" wavelength, WOK was required to establish a time sharing agreement with any other local stations broadcasting on 360 meters. Later that year, the station was also authorized to broadcast on the 485 meter "market and weather" wavelength.

The main person responsible for establishing the station was Harvey C. Couch, who had founded Arkansas Power and Light (AP&L). Ralph R. Pittman, AP&L's electrical superintendent, installed a transmitting antenna, strung between two 100-foot (30 m) towers, located at the company’s Main Street office. The station debuted on February 18, 1922. The schedule was Tuesdays and Fridays from 8:00 to 9:00 p.m.

Broadcasting was suspended in June 1923, and it was said that it would resume in the fall. However, the station remained silent, and was deleted in June 1924.

== See also ==
- List of initial AM-band station grants in the United States
