= David L. Starling =

American businessman and railroad executive (died 2023)

- Born: c. 1949
- Died: February 24, 2023 (aged 73)
- Occupation: Railroad executive
- Known for: President and CEO of Kansas City Southern

David L. Starling (c. 1949 – February 24, 2023) was an American businessman and railroad executive, best known for running the Kansas City Southern Railroad.

== Early work ==
After growing up in Booneville, Arkansas, Starling began his career as a railroader in 1967 on the Chicago, Rock Island and Pacific Railroad depot two blocks from his house. After attending college, he went to work in 1971 for the St. Louis–San Francisco Railway as a clerk telegrapher. He entered dispatcher training in 1973 in the consolidated training office in Springfield, Missouri, later taking management training and becoming an assistant trainmaster in Memphis, Tennessee, where he worked for Hunter Harrison. When the Burlington Northern Railroad purchased the railroad in 1980, he became Director of Trains and Terminals for his region; as part of his work, he first met Mike Haverty, who he would later succeed as President and CEO of Kansas City Southern.

In 1984, he joined Mi-Jack Products and, working for Jack Lanigan, started up In-Terminal Services. In 1988, he became a managing director for American President Lines, first managing stack trains in the Chicago region, then for the Southern region, headquartered in Atlanta, which managed double-stack trains crossing the Mexican border for, among other customers, Ford and Chrysler. After overseas posts in the Philippines and Hong Kong, he was recruited to work on the Panama Canal Railway rehabilitation project, which Lanigan and Haverty were working on as well; he moved to Panama in 1999, and construction finished in July 2001.

== Kansas City Southern ==
Starling became President of the Kansas City Southern in 2008. In 2010, he took over as CEO from Mike Haverty, effective August 1. The transition occurred just as the company suffered a major 23-day outage along a mainline in Mexico due to Hurricane Alex.

In 2012, he was named Railroader of the Year by Railway Age. He stepped down as President on March 1, 2015, and as CEO on July 1, 2016, handing control to Patrick J. Ottensmeyer.

== Death ==
Starling died on February 24, 2023, at the age of 73.

== See also ==
- List of railroad executives

Business positions
Preceded by Mike Haverty	President of Kansas City Southern; 2008–2015	Succeeded by Patrick J. Ottensmeyer
Preceded by Mike Haverty	CEO of Kansas City Southern; 2010–2016	Succeeded by Patrick J. Ottensmeyer
Awards and achievements
Preceded by Charles Moorman (Amtrak)	Railroader of the Year; 2012	Succeeded by James R. Young (UP)
