= Couchwood =

- U.S. National Register of Historic Places
- U.S. Historic district
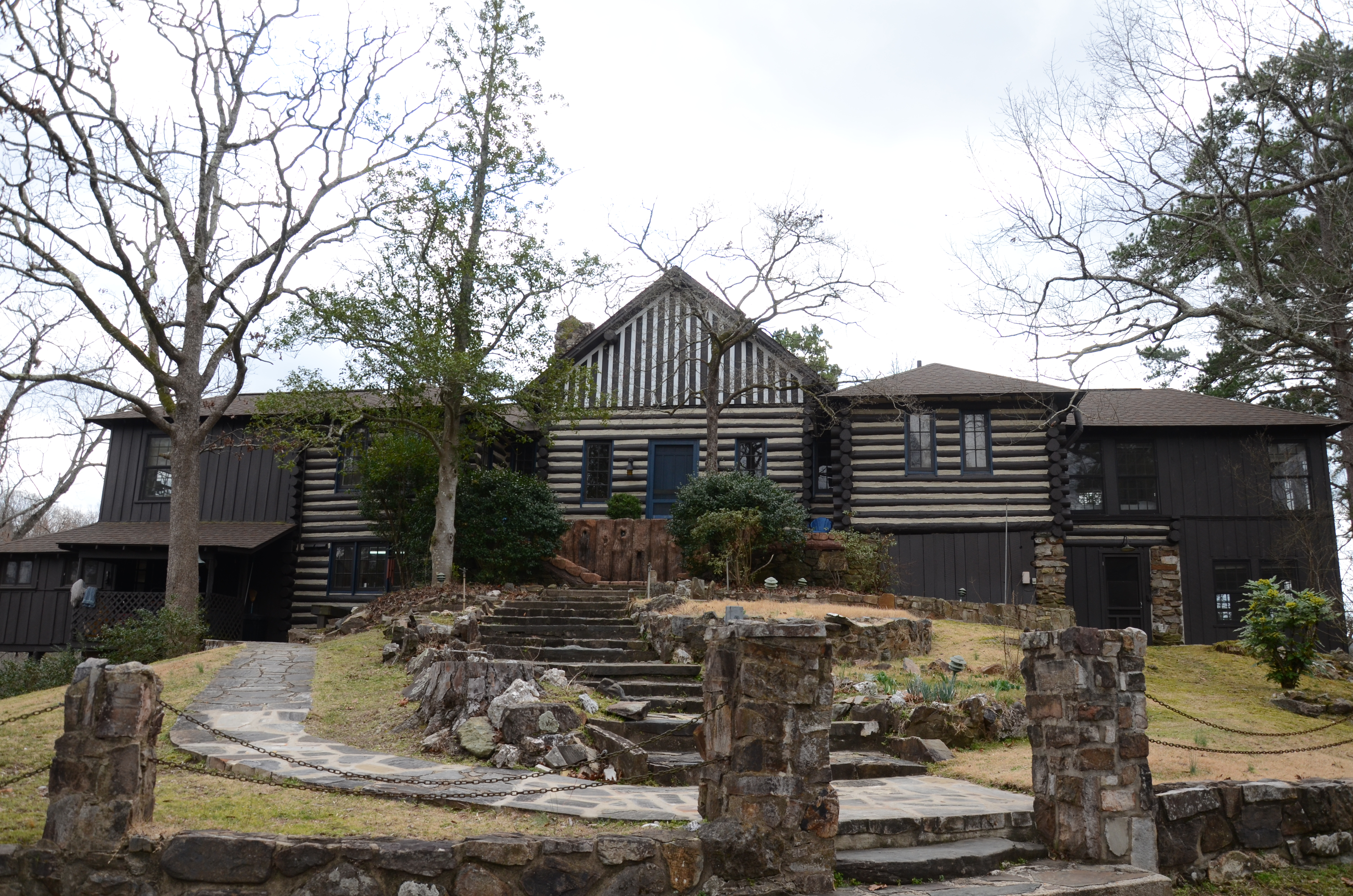

- Location within Arkansas Location within the United States
- Nearest city: Shorewood Hills, Arkansas
- Coordinates: 34°26′54″N 92°54′53″W
- Area: 17 acres (6.9 ha)
- Built: 1927; 1939
- Architect: Rodriguez, Dionicio; Almand, John Parks
- MPS: Arkansas Sculptures of Dionicio Rodriguez TR
- NRHP reference No.: 86003582
- Added to NRHP: December 4, 1986

Couchwood is the summer estate of Harvey C. Couch, an industrialist and founder of Arkansas Power and Light in the early 20th century. The estate, located at 601 Couchwood Road, is southeast of Hot Springs, Arkansas, straddling the border of Garland and Hot Spring counties on the north shore of Lake Catherine.

The 17-acre (6.9 ha) estate was listed on the National Register of Historic Places for two separate reasons. It was first listed on 1986 for the five naturalistic sculptures by Dionicio Rodriguez that are located on the property; these were commissioned by Couch. The estate was again listed on 2001 for its association with Couch, and for its well-preserved collection of Rustic architecture. Several of the estate's eight buildings were designed by the noted Arkansas architect John Parks Almand.

Presidents Hoover and Roosevelt both spent time at Couchwood as guests. There are five red cedar log-houses on the estate: the Big House, Calhoun, Little Pine Bluff, Remmelwood and the Traincar.

Today, the estate serves as a retreat for descendants and visitors. The estate is sometimes available for renting for such purposes as weddings, business trips or as a vacation getaway.

== Gallery ==
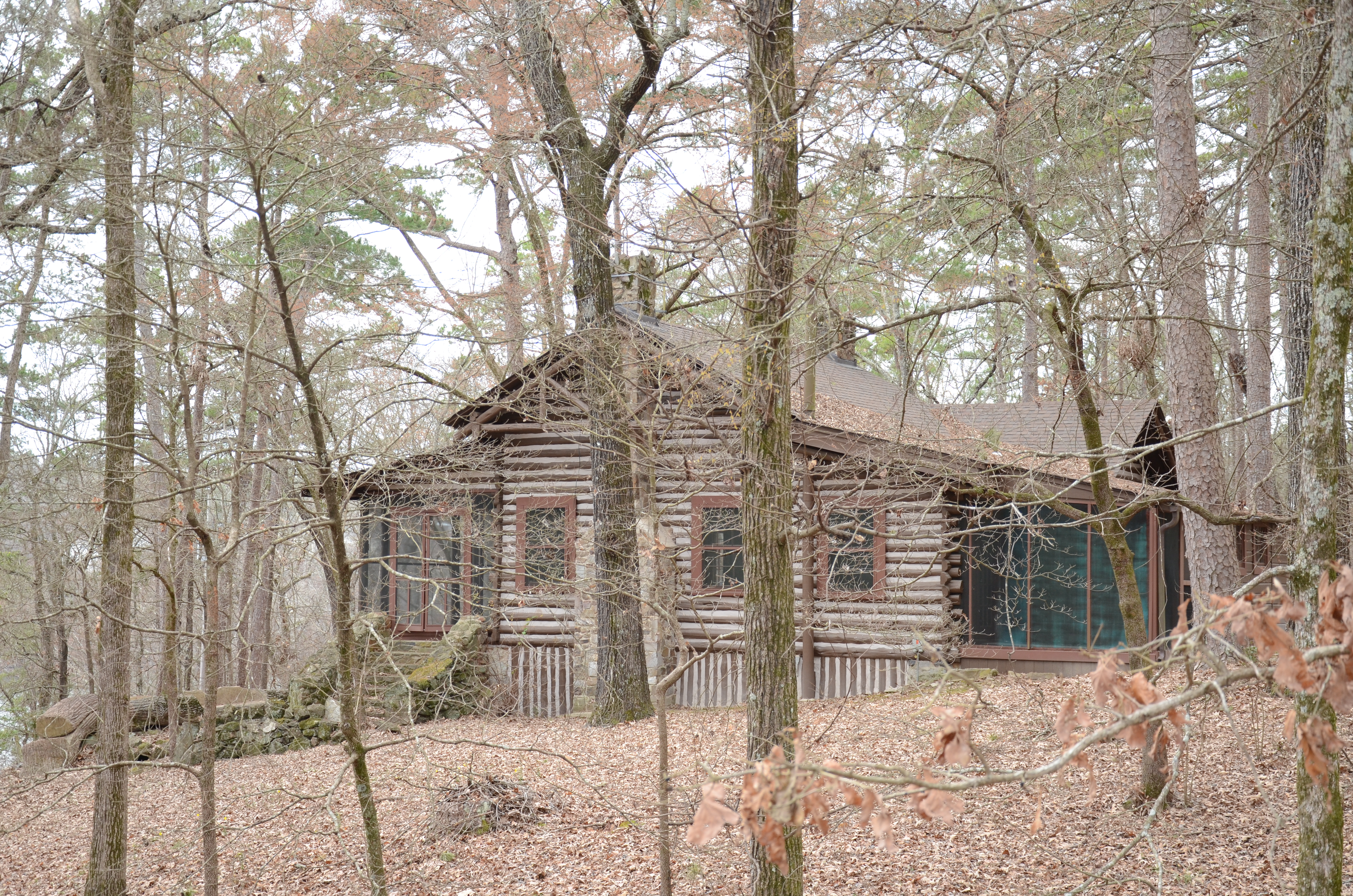
Little Pine Bluff, Vaughn 2016

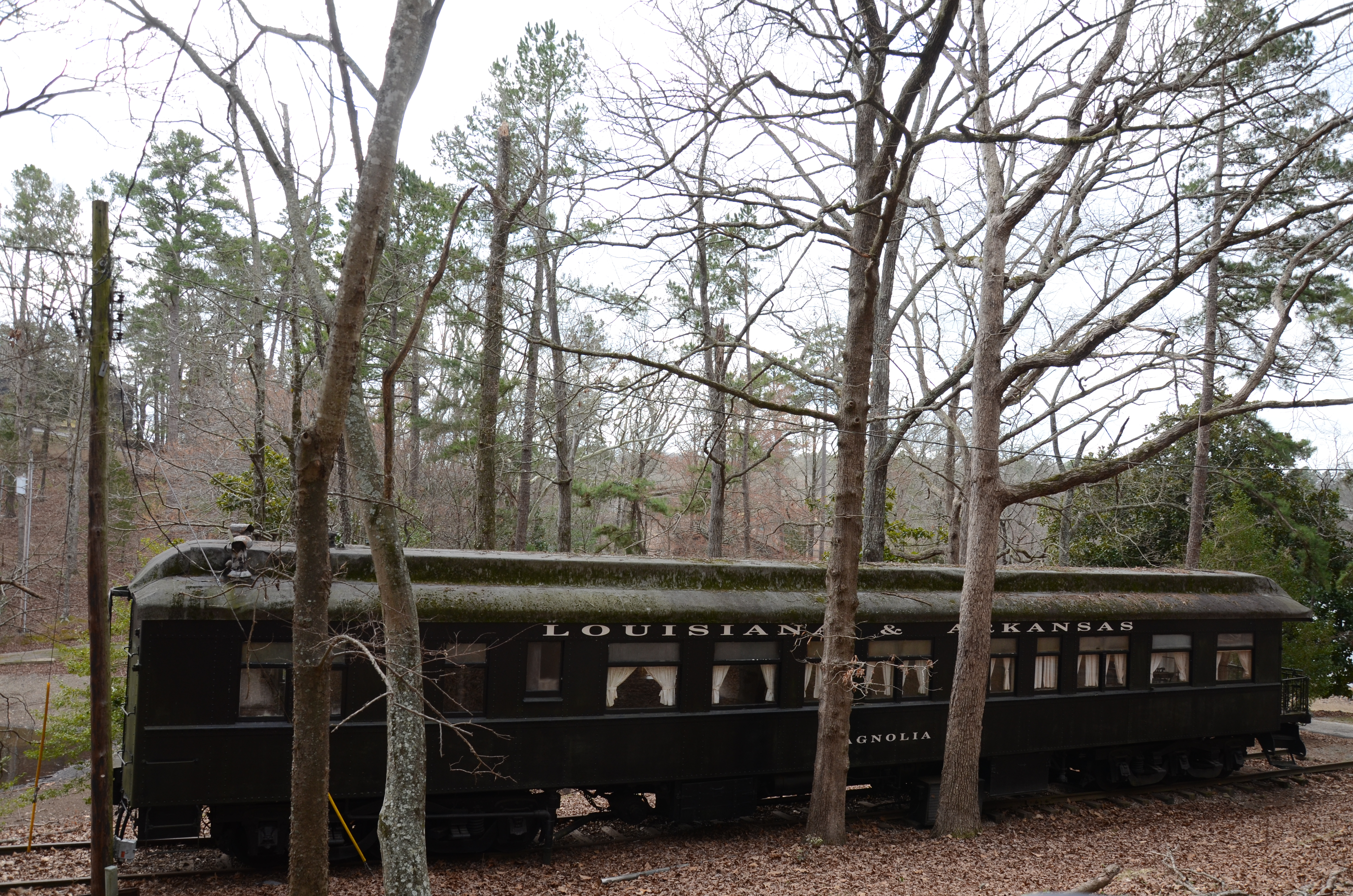
Magnolia Railroad Car, Vaughn 2016

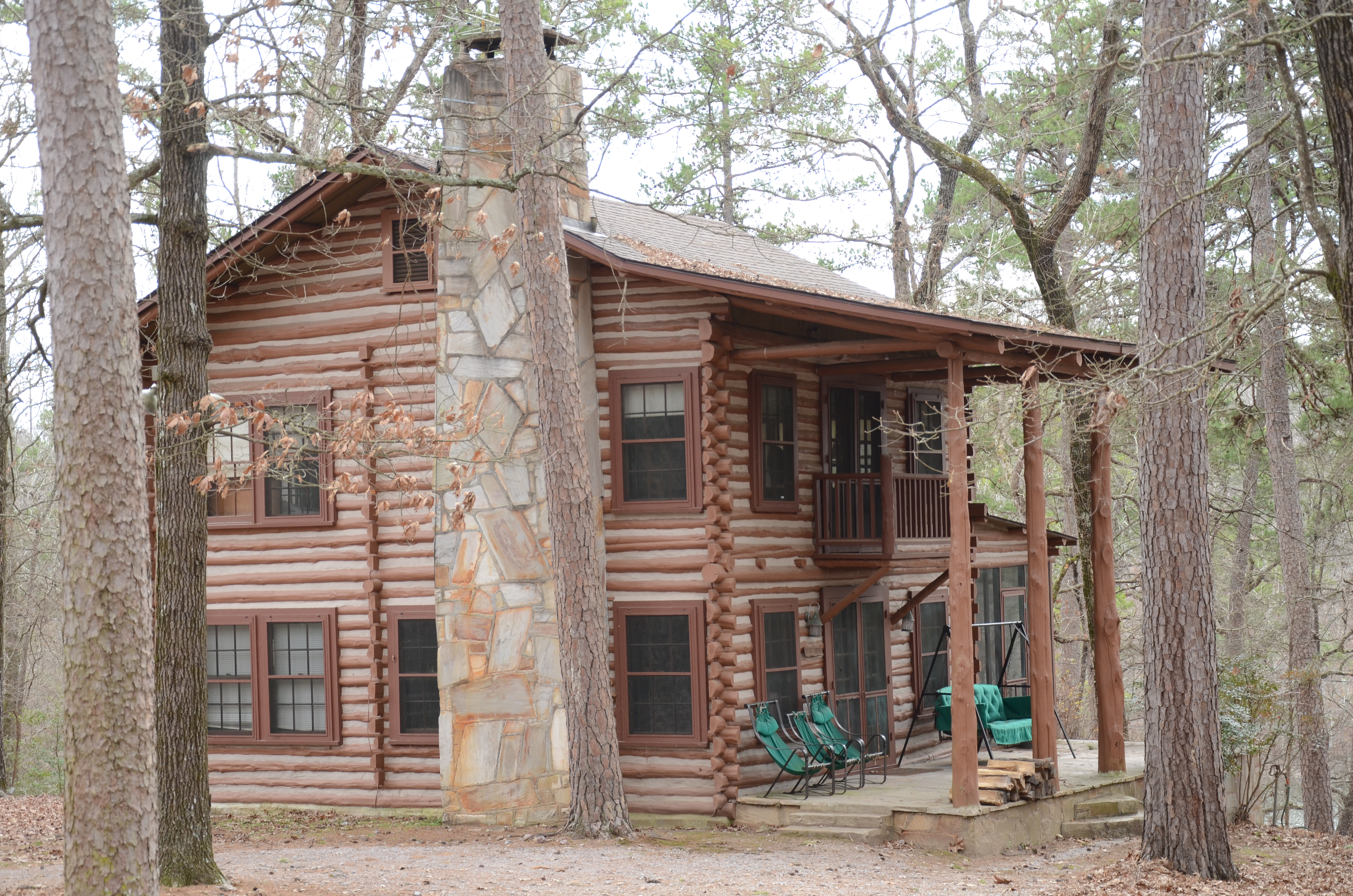
Remmelwood, Vaughn 2016

== See also ==
- National Register of Historic Places listings in Garland County, Arkansas
- National Register of Historic Places listings in Hot Spring County, Arkansas
