= Edward T. Reidy =

Edward T. Reidy (April 4, 1903 – October 1975) was an American railroad executive; he led the Chicago Great Western Railway between 1957 and its merger with the Chicago and North Western Railway in 1968. He had worked for the CGW for more than fifty years; previous to his presidency, he had acted as the Great Western's vice president and general manager from 1952, during the tenure of William N. Deramus III.

Preceded by William N. Deramus III	President of Chicago Great Western Railway; 1957 – 1968	Succeeded by nobody
