= Cookeville station =

- Cookeville Railroad Depot
- U.S. National Register of Historic Places
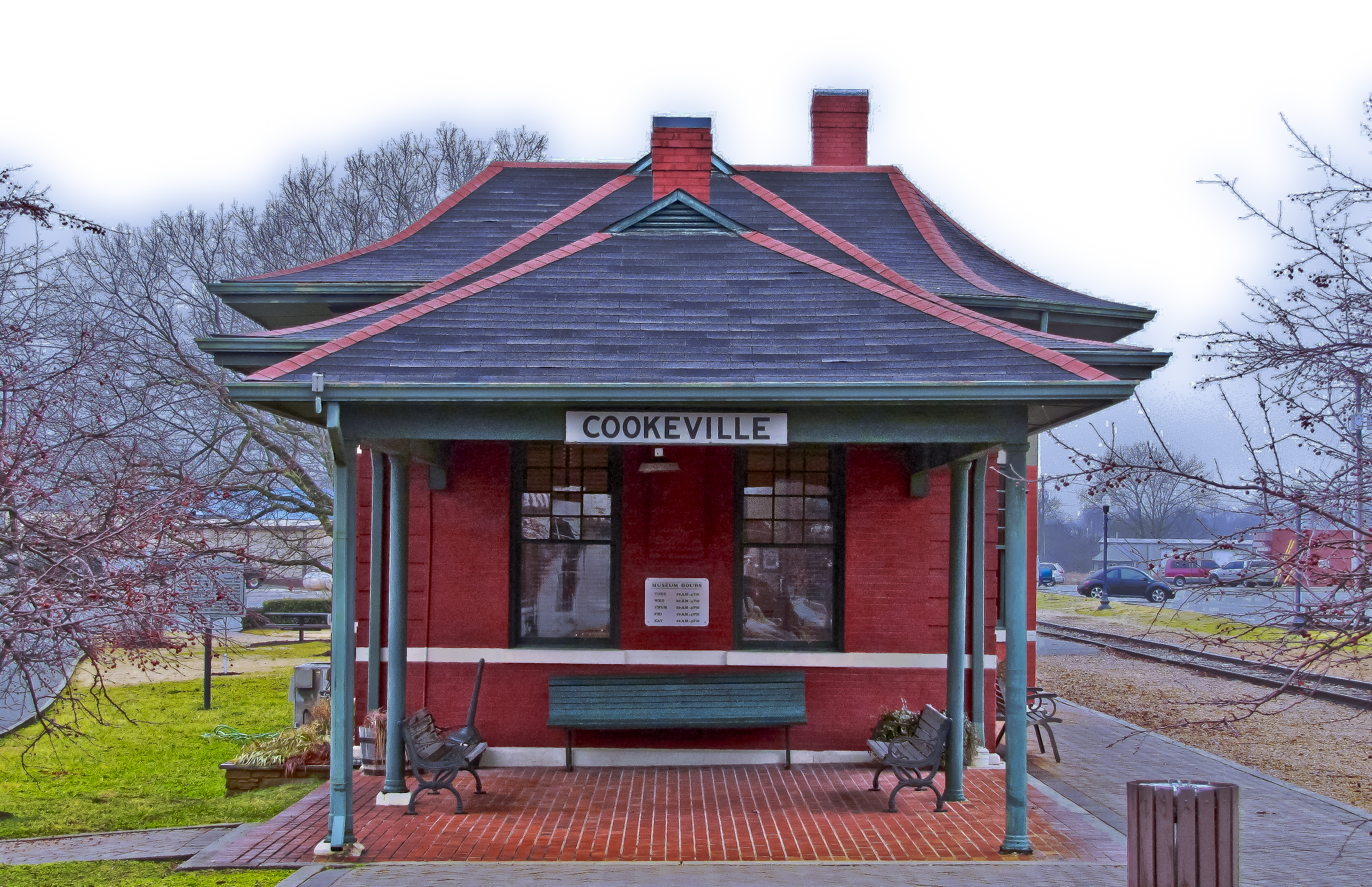
- Cookeville Railroad Depot
- Location: 116 West Broad Street, Cookeville, Tennessee
- Coordinates: 36°9′51″N 85°30′30″W
- Built: 1909
- NRHP reference No.: 85002773
- Added to NRHP: 1985

The Cookeville Railroad Depot is a railroad depot in Cookeville, in the U.S. state of Tennessee. Built by the Tennessee Central Railway in 1909, the depot served Cookeville until the 1950s when passenger train service to the city was phased out. The depot was placed on the National Register of Historic Places in 1985 and is home to the Cookeville Depot Museum.

Although it was often wrought with financial difficulties and struggled in the face of competition from the larger L&N and Southern railroads, the construction of the Tennessee Central line was an important political and economic milestone for late-19th century Middle Tennessee. The railroad connected the residents of the Upper Cumberland region to the outside world, and gave the region's farmers access to major markets in Nashville and Knoxville. The railroad also brought urbanization and modern development to Cookeville and other cities in the Upper Cumberland and Cumberland Plateau regions.

== Construction of the Tennessee Central ==
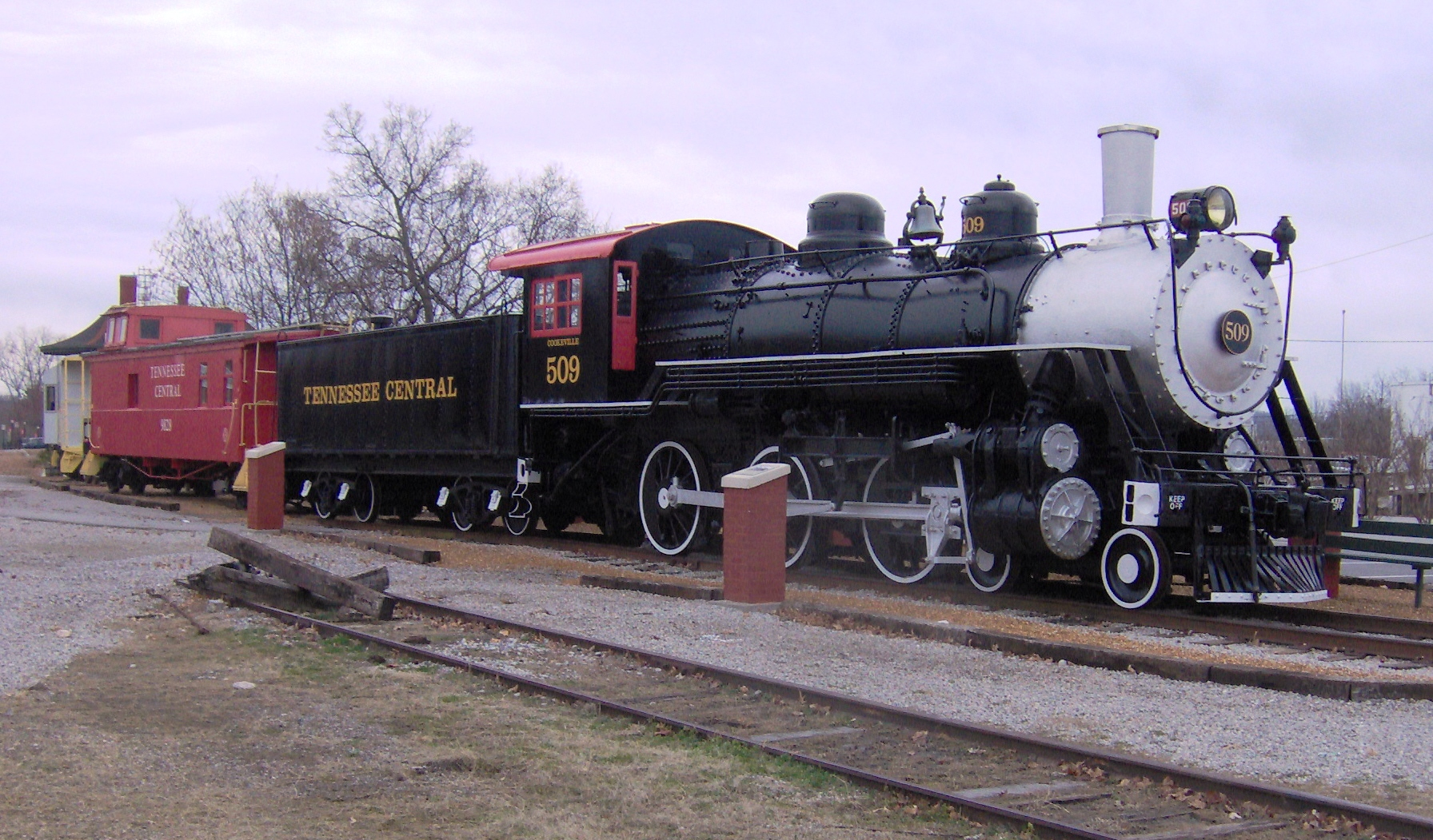
1913 Baldwin 4-6-0 #509 at the Cookeville Depot Museum

After the Civil War, large-scale railroad construction occurred in East Tennessee and the Nashville and Memphis areas, but the difficult terrain of the Highland Rim and the Cumberland Plateau stalled the railroad's advance into the Upper Cumberland region. In the 1870s, the Tennessee and Pacific Railroad built a line connecting Nashville and Lebanon (this line was purchased by the Nashville, Chattanooga and St. Louis Railway in 1877). Politicians and newspaper reporters across the Upper Cumberland region initiated a massive publicity campaign in the early 1880s calling for the railroad to be extended across Middle Tennessee.

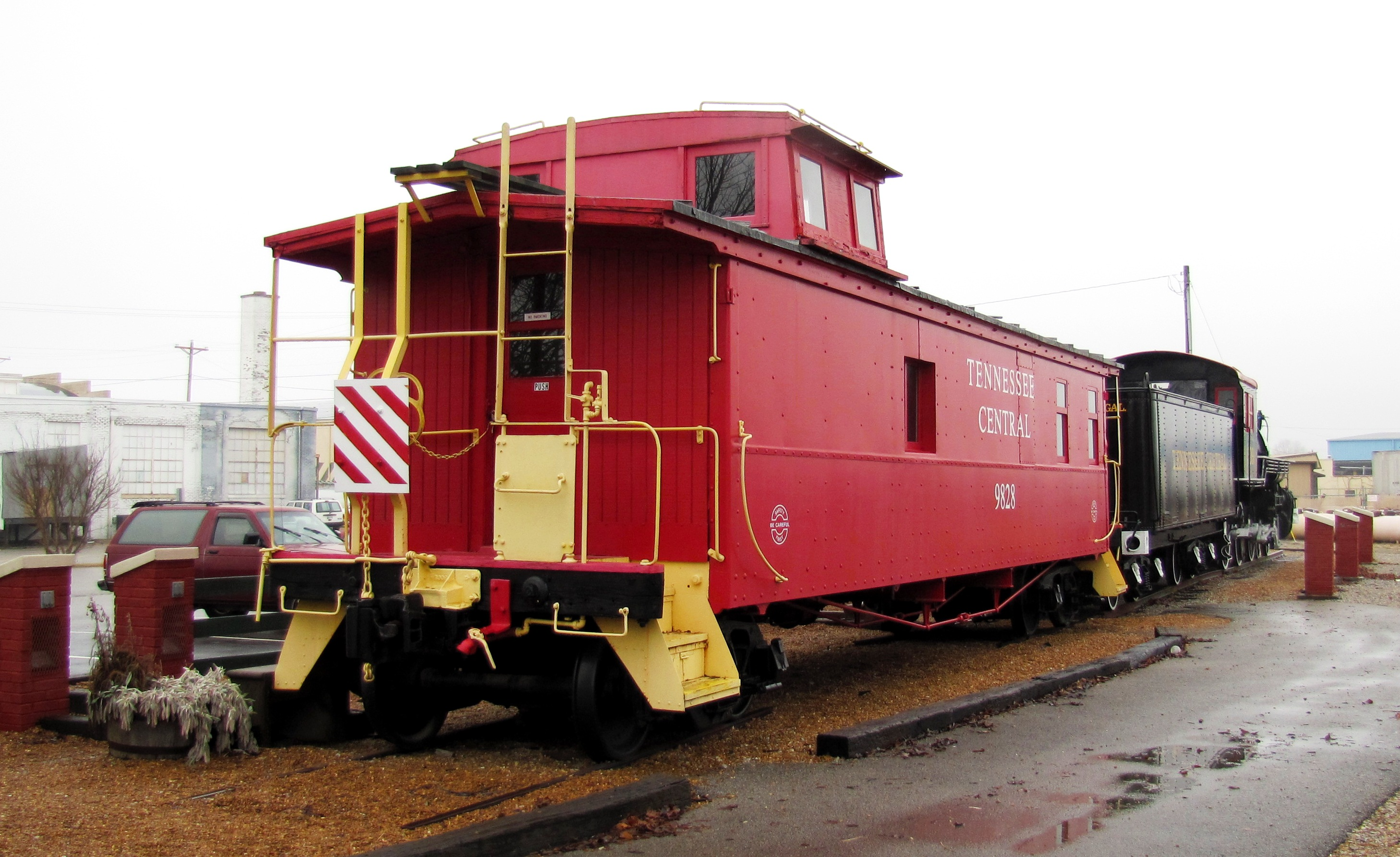
Cupola-style caboose at the Cookeville Depot Museum

In 1884, mining entrepreneur Alexander Crawford, believing the Upper Cumberland region to be endowed with vast deposits of high-quality coal, chartered the Nashville & Knoxville Railroad with plans to extend the railroad across the Cumberland Plateau and allow shipment of coal to markets in Nashville and Knoxville. Although a particularly difficult stretch between Watertown and Silver Point— requiring the building of several trestles across the Caney Fork— slowed the railroad's construction, the Nashville & Knoxville's tracks nevertheless reached Cookeville in July 1890. Although Crawford died shortly thereafter, his sons continued his work, and managed to extend the tracks to Monterey, at the edge of the Cumberland Plateau.

In 1893, Middle Tennessee businessman Jere Baxter (1852–1904) chartered the Tennessee Central Railroad with plans to continue what Crawford had started. Like Crawford, Baxter faced major economic obstacles. He raised funds by selling bonds to Cumberland and Roane counties, and saved money by using convict labor. He also had to overcome legal maneuvering by the L&N and Southern railroads, who feared the Tennessee Central's competition. In 1898, the Tennessee Central completed its eastern section, connecting Monterey with the Southern tracks at Harriman. Baxter purchased the Nashville & Knoxville Railroad in 1902, and two years later the Tennessee Central completed a line from Nashville to the Illinois Central tracks at Hopkinsville, Kentucky, thus connecting Middle Tennessee to the rest of the country. Cookeville residents could now travel all the way to Minnesota via 10-hour train ride.

After Baxter's death in 1904, the Tennessee Central continued to struggle with financing. It attempted lease arrangements with both the Illinois Central and Southern Railroad, but by 1908 these arrangements had been abandoned. In 1912, the Tennessee Central was placed in receivership, and in subsequent years was reorganized with more of a focus on freight traffic. By the mid-20th century, the rise of automobile and bus travel brought about the decline of passenger trains. The last passenger train left Cookeville on July 31, 1955.

== Cookeville Depot ==
The Nashville & Knoxville Railroad constructed the first railroad depot at Cookeville in the 1890s. The mere announcement of the company's plans for the depot "one half-mile west of the courthouse" caused property values in the western section of town to skyrocket. Along with the depot, N&K built a two-story office building, a reservoir, and several repair shops. The Tennessee Central replaced the N&K depot with the present pagoda-like structure in 1909, although it moved the service facilities to Monterey.

The presence of the railroad depot led to a boom in housing construction in Cookeville. Residences were built along or near the tracks, and a shanty town known as "Boxtown" developed in the vicinity of what is now Cookeville Regional Medical Center. Shops lined the road between the depot and the courthouse square, culminating in a large shopping mall known as "The Arcade," which was located across the street from the Putnam County Courthouse. The railroad also made possible the establishment of Dixie College and Tennessee Polytechnic Institute— the forerunners of Tennessee Technological University.

== Cookeville Depot Museum ==
The City of Cookeville, with help from the nonprofit group Friends of the Depot, maintains the Cookeville Depot as a museum. Along with the depot, the museum maintains a collection of train cars and railroad memorabilia. Engine #509, a 4-6-0 ten-wheeler built by Baldwin Locomotive Works in 1913, originally used by the Louisiana and Arkansas Railway, was acquired by the museum in 2002 from the Tennessee Valley Railroad Museum and its appearance modified to match contemporary Tennessee Central engines. The museum acquired an L&N bay window caboose (with a newer gray-and-yellow paint scheme, as opposed to the traditional red) in 1985, and in 2005 restored a red cupola-style caboose to its original appearance.

== See also ==
- Tennessee Central Railway Museum
- National Register of Historic Places listings in Putnam County, Tennessee
