= Thomas S. Carter =

American engineer (1921–2019)

Thomas S. Carter Jr.
- Born: June 6, 1921; Dallas, Texas, United States
- Died: March 12, 2019 (aged 97)
- Education: Southern Methodist University, University of Kansas
- Occupation: railroad engineer

Thomas Smith Carter Jr. (June 6, 1921 – March 12, 2019) was an American engineer. He served as the thirteenth president of Kansas City Southern Railway, from 1973 to 1986.

Carter was born in Dallas, Texas to Thomas Smith and Matilda (née Dowell) Carter. He served in the Army Corps of Engineers during WWII in the South Pacific. He attended Southern Methodist University where he earned a Bachelor of Science degree in civil engineering in 1944. He worked his way up in the railroad industry, ultimately becoming Chairman, President and CEO of the Kansas City Southern Railroad. He retired in 1990 and served as a director for 5 more years. He also attended the University of Kansas and earned his master's degree in engineering management in 1991. Carter has worked as an engineer for the Louisiana and Arkansas Railway, Missouri–Kansas–Texas Railroad, and Oklahoma, Kansas and Texas Railroads. He also has served with the Kansas City Southern Railway as its chief engineer, vice president of operations, and vice president. He also served as vice president of the Louisiana and Arkansas Railway in the 1960s. He taught college for several years at Johnson County Community College in Kansas.

Carter was married to Janet Hostetter from 1946 until her death in 1981, and with her had four children. He had five grandchildren and one great-grandchild at the time of his death.

Carter volunteered at the David Powell Food Pantry at his church, First United Methodist Church in Lindale, TX, later in his life,

Business positions
| Preceded by William N. Deramus III | President of Kansas City Southern Railway; 1973–1986 | Succeeded by William N. Deramus IV |
