= James R. Young (railroad executive) =

American railroad executive (1952–2014)

Jim Young
- Born: James Ruesch Young; October 24, 1952
- Died: February 15, 2014 (aged 61)
- Education: Omaha South High School; University of Nebraska at Omaha; Bellevue University (Doctorate of Commerce, 2008)
- Occupation: Railroad executive
- Known for: President, CEO and chairman of Union Pacific Railroad

James Ruesch Young (October 24, 1952 — February 15, 2014) was an American railroad executive who was the president, chief executive officer and chairman of the board for Union Pacific Railroad from 2006 to his death in February 2014.

== Early life and education ==
Young graduated from Omaha South High School and the University of Nebraska at Omaha.

On June 7, 2008, Young received a Doctorate of Commerce from Bellevue University.

== Career ==
He began working for Union Pacific in 1978. Through a series of promotions he worked his way up the chain of command to be elected president of the railroad in January 2004. In February 2005, he was elected to the board of directors for the railroad. On January 1, 2006, he succeeded Richard K. Davidson as CEO of Union Pacific Corporation, the parent company of Union Pacific Railroad.

Young assumed the additional role of chairman of the board of directors as of February 1, 2007. He remained as chairman after stepping down as president and CEO.

== Death ==
Young died on February 15, 2014, after a two-year battle with pancreatic cancer.

Business positions
Preceded by Ike Evans	President of Union Pacific Railroad; 2004-2012	Succeeded by Jack Koraleski
Preceded by Richard K. Davidson	CEO of Union Pacific Corporation; 2006-2012	Succeeded by Jack Koraleski
Awards
Preceded by David L. Starling	Railroader of the Year; 2013	Succeeded by Joseph H. Boardman
