= George W. Edwards =

George W. Edwards (born April 30, 1939) was the sixteenth president of Kansas City Southern Railway.

Business positions
Preceded by Landon H. Rowland	President of Kansas City Southern Railway; 1991 – 1995	Succeeded by Michael R. Haverty
