= Leonor F. Loree =

American civil engineer, lawyer, and railroad executive (1858–1940)

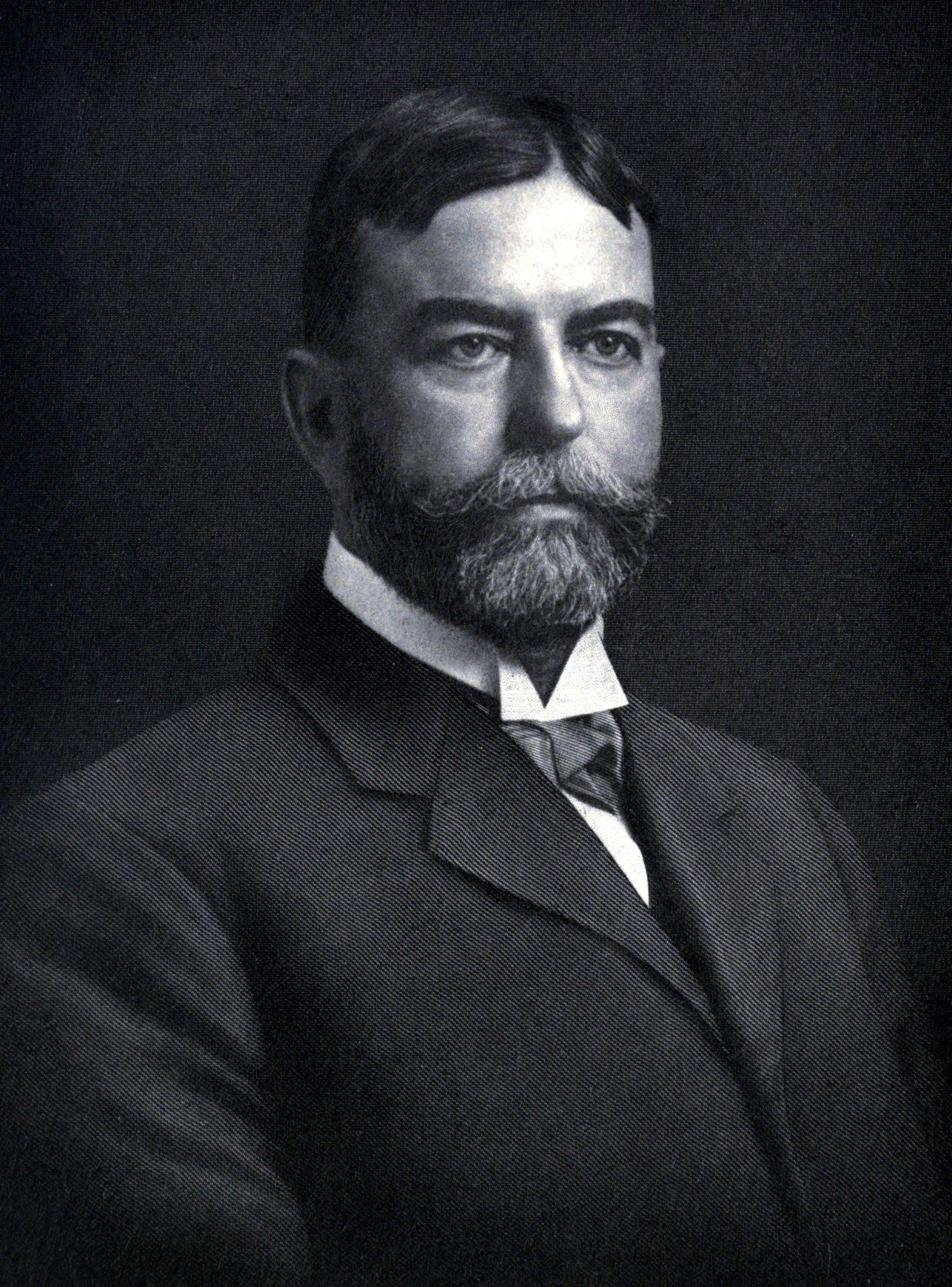
- Born: Leonor Fresnel Loree; April 23, 1858; Fulton City, Illinois, U.S.
- Died: September 6, 1940 (aged 82); West Orange, New Jersey, U.S.
- Education: Rutgers College (BS, MS, LLD); Rensselaer Polytechnic Institute (DEng)
- Occupations: Financier, executive

Leonor F. Loree (April 23, 1858 – September 6, 1940) was an American civil engineer, lawyer, railroad executive, and founder of the American Newcomen Society. He was President of the Delaware & Hudson Railroad and had interests in Kansas City Southern, Baltimore and Ohio, New York Central, and the Rock Island Railroads.

== Early life ==
Loree obtained a Bachelor of Science degree in 1877, a Master of Science in 1880, a Civil Engineering degree in 1896 and a Doctor of Law in 1917, all from Rutgers College. He also obtained a Doctor of Engineering degree from Rensselaer Polytechnic Institute in 1933.

== Career ==
- Pennsylvania Railroad: Assistant Engineer of Chicago Division 1883-1885, Engineer of Maintenance of Way (on western division of CStL&P) 1885-1888, Engineer of Maintenance of Way (on Cleveland and Pittsburgh Division of Lines West) 1888-1889, Superintendent (Cleveland and Pittsburgh Division) 1889-1896, General Manager (of Lines West) 1896-1901, Fourth Vice President (of Lines West) 1901-1901, Director 1901-1904
- Baltimore and Ohio Railroad: president 1901 - 1904, board member until February 1922
- Chicago, Rock Island and Pacific Railroad president 1904-1904
- Kansas City Southern Railway: chairman of board 1905-1906. chairman of executive committee 1906-1909, chairman 1909-1918, president 1918 - 1920
- Missouri-Kansas-Texas Railroad: chairman 1926 - 1928
- Delaware and Hudson Railroad: president 1907 - 1938

In 1903, Loree, together with Frank PJ Patenall, received U.S. patent 733,981, for the upper quadrant semaphore, which soon became the most widely used form of railroad lineside signal in North America. Railroads continued to install them until the 1940s.

In 1906 a committee of creditors asked Loree to take charge of the Kansas City Southern Railroad. At the time it was considered no more than "two streaks of rust, its engines lost steam, the men were disheartened and the stations were shacks." After Loree gave his initial inspection, in a speech in front of the financial community, he ended his professional and technical description of the railroad line by stating, "This is a helluva way to run a railroad".

== Personal life ==
Loree was a Trustee at Rutgers University from 1909 to 1940 and was Chairman of the Rutgers Board of Trustees Committee on New Jersey College for Women (now Douglass College) until 1938. He was the donor of the New Jersey College for Women Athletic Field (Antilles Field). Rutgers has a building named after him, Leonor Fresnel Loree, erected in 1963 on the Douglass campus.

In 1923, Loree was a principal founder of The Newcomen Society in North America, a learned society promoting engineering, technology and free enterprise.

== Published works ==
- Economy in railway operation-Engineering Magazine, Volume 9, 1895.

== See also ==
- List of railroad executives

Business positions
Preceded by David Wilcox	President of Delaware and Hudson Railway; 1907 – 1938	Succeeded by Joseph H. Nuelle
Preceded by Job A. Edson	President of Kansas City Southern Railway; 1918 – 1920	Succeeded by Job A. Edson
