= Mike Haverty =

American railroad executive

Michael R. Haverty
- Born: June 11, 1944 (age 81); Atchison, Kansas
- Occupation: railroad executive

Mike Haverty (born June 11, 1944) is a fourth generation railroader who began his career as a switchman/brakeman in 1963 for the Missouri Pacific Railroad in his hometown of Atchison, Kansas. In 1970 he went to work for the Atchison, Topeka & Santa Fe Railway.

Haverty spent 21 years at Santa Fe, mostly in operating department positions, before being elected president in 1989. He served as president from 1989 to 1991. He formed his own company, Haverty Corp, after leaving Santa Fe and traveled internationally looking for railroad investments. In 1995 he was recruited to run the Kansas City Southern Railway. In 2001 he became chairman, president and CEO of Kansas City Southern, a transportation holding company with railroads in the United States, Mexico and Panama. He retired from Kansas City Southern in 2015 after a 20-year career with the company.

== Personal life ==
Haverty was educated by the Benedictines in grade school, high school and one year of college in Atchison before transferring after St. Benedict's College (now Benedictine College) dropped football and he transferred. He went on to graduate from the University of Louisiana-Lafayette (BA), has an MBA from the University of Chicago and an Honorary PhD in Humane Letters from Benedictine College.

Haverty has been married to his wife, Marlys, for fifty-seven years and they have three children and eleven grandchildren. Mike and Marlys Haverty reside in Mission Hills, Kansas. Their three children, and seven of their eleven grandchildren, live in the Kansas City Metropolitan area.

Since 2020, Haverty has been a minority stakeholder in the ownership group of the Kansas City Royals.

== See also ==
- List of railroad executives

Business positions
| Preceded by W. John Swartz | President of Atchison, Topeka and Santa Fe Railway; 1989 – 1995 | BNSF merger |
| Preceded by George W. Edwards | President of Kansas City Southern Railway; 1995 – 2008 | Succeeded by David L. Starling |
| Preceded by The Railroad Worker | Railroader of the Year; 2001 | Succeeded by E. Hunter Harrison |
