= Charles E. Johnston =

Charles E. Johnston (October 30, 1881 – July 10, 1951) was the eighth president of Kansas City Southern Railway.

Business positions
Preceded by Job A. Edson	President of Kansas City Southern Railway; 1928 – 1938	Succeeded by Harvey C. Couch
