= Harvey C. Couch =

American businessman (1877–1941)

Harvey Crowley Couch, Sr.
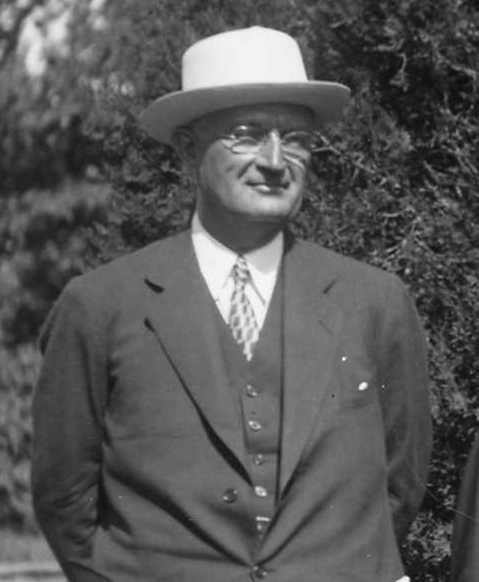
- Born: 21 August 1877; Calhoun, Columbia County, Arkansas, US
- Died: 30 July 1941 (aged 63); Couchwood, Hot Springs, Garland County, Arkansas, US
- Resting place: Magnolia Cemetery in Magnolia, Arkansas
- Education: Magnolia Academy
- Occupations: Utilities, Railroad, Radio executive
- Political party: Democrat
- Spouse: Jessie Johnson Couch
- Children: 5

Harvey Crowley Couch, Sr. (21 August 1877 – 30 July 1941), was an Arkansas entrepreneur who rose from modest beginnings to control a regional utility and railroad empire. He is regarded as the father of Arkansas Power and Light Company and other electric utilities now part of Entergy; he helped mold the Louisiana and Arkansas Railway and the Kansas City Southern Railway into a major transportation system. His work with local and federal government leaders during World War I and the Great Depression gained him national recognition and earned him positions in state and federal agencies. He also established Arkansas' first commercial broadcast radio station.

== Early life and family ==
Couch was born in Calhoun, a tiny community in Columbia County in southern Arkansas. The eldest of six children, he assisted his parents and younger siblings with the endless work associated with a small cotton farm. His father was also a Methodist minister. When Couch was seventeen, his father's health deteriorated, and the family moved to nearby Magnolia, the county seat of Columbia County. During this time, he was instructed by a future governor of Texas and president of Baylor University, Pat Neff, at Southwestern Academy in Magnolia, also known as Magnolia Academy. He left school early to help with the family finances and assist his mother, the former Marie Heard, with his younger siblings. His first paying job was to start the boiler every morning at Lum Barnett's cotton gin, for which he received 50 cents daily.

After working in several clerical positions at local small businesses, Couch saw a newspaper advertisement seeking mail clerks; the pay was $75 per month, significantly higher than his then salary of $20. Passing the entrance exam in Shreveport, Louisiana, qualified Couch to enter the United States Post Office's Railway Mail Service, for which he would sort mail in one of the many railway postal cars which criss-crossed the nation. Couch initially worked on a Railway Post Office route on the St. Louis, Iron Mountain & Southern Railway between St. Louis and Texarkana, then a Memphis and Texarkana run over the St. Louis Southwestern Railway, before getting an assignment in Louisiana south of his home town of Magnolia.

On 4 October 1904, Couch married Jessie Johnson of Athens in Claiborne Parish east of Minden, a small city in Webster Parish in which he had business interests. Together they had five children. His brother, Peter Couch, worked with him on various business ventures and held executive positions in several of his companies. Prior to working for Couch, lifelong friend and business attorney Hamilton Moses was a law partner of future U.S. senator Joe T. Robinson. The Democrat Couch was the father-in-law of Pratt C. Remmel, the only elected Republican to have served as mayor of Little Rock in the 20th century. Remmel's wife (and Couch's daughter), Catherine Couch Remmel (1918-2006), is honored by the naming of Lake Catherine near Hot Springs.

His sons were Johnson Olin Couch (1905-1958), Kirke A. Couch, Harvey Couch, Jr. (1908-1963), an officer of the Union National Bank in the capital city of Little Rock, and William Thomas Couch.

== Business career ==
While still working on the Railway Post Office route from McNeil, Arkansas, into north Louisiana, Couch was exposed to the development of the long-distance telephone. Believing he could earn money distributing telephone service, he formed a partnership with the postmaster of Bienville, Louisiana, Ben Cheen. In the spring of 1903 they completed 15 miles of telephone line construction from Bienville to Arcadia, Louisiana. After buying out Cheen's share of the business for $1,000, Couch and friend Dr. H. A. Longino formed the North Louisiana Telephone Company. By 1910 the company had constructed more than 1,500 miles of line, serving 50 exchanges in four states. In 1911, at age 34, Couch sold the company to Southwestern Bell Telephone Company, giving him a profit of more than $1 million. His business interests in Louisiana brought Couch into political alliance with Huey Pierce Long Jr., the flamboyant governor and United States senator.

By the time North Louisiana Telephone Company had been sold, Couch was already exploring the possibilities of developing a similar interconnected electric utility system. Both Malvern and Arkadelphia had awarded franchises for citywide electric utilities, and in both cities, the utility companies were in decline, and only provided night-time service. Couch proposed a partnership with Arkansas Land & Lumber Company, a large sawmill operation in Malvern, whereby sawdust and waste material purchased from the sawmill would be used to fuel boilers, producing steam for two 550-kilowatt turbines to generate electric power. The new system, a predecessor of Arkansas Power and Light Company (AP&L), became operational on 18 December 1914, providing Malvern and Arkadelphia with 24-hour electric service for the first time. In 1916, AP&L's second generating plant opened in Russellville, seat of Pope County in north-central Arkansas. The plant was adjacent to a coal field which provided a steady supply of fuel. Under leadership of Couch, AP&L continued purchasing city utility systems and building electric transmission lines throughout Arkansas.

As demand for electric power increased, Couch began formalizing plans for hydroelectric development on the Ouachita River. The first of several such dams, Remmel Dam, was completed in December 1924. Carpenter Dam followed in 1933. The U.S. Army Corps of Engineers completed Blakely Mountain Dam in 1952, after Couch's death. Damming the Ouachita River transformed Arkansas's countryside and created three large lakes. Lake Catherine and Lake Hamilton in Garland County, popular lakes for public recreation, were named after Couch's only daughter, and close friend and company lawyer Hamilton Moses. Revenue generated by construction of Remmel Dam was in excess of $25,000 per year. Inexpensive energy produced by these new projects helped lure several major industrial plants to Arkansas. Pine Bluff received the state's first textile mill, the International Paper Co. opened a paper mill in Camden, and other companies followed.

In the 1920s, Couch had set his sights on buying electric companies in other states. In 1923, he merged four independent companies in Mississippi into Mississippi Power and Light. Two years later, he formed Louisiana Power and Light, which provided power to his Mississippi customers from northern Louisiana's natural gas fields.

Meanwhile, in 1922, Sidney Mitchel of the Electric Bond and Share Company (EBASCO), a subsidiary of General Electric, had merged several competing electric utilities in New Orleans into New Orleans Public Service, an EBASCO subsidiary. Mitchel began turning his attention to other territories, and eventually began competing with Couch. The two men ultimately merged their resources. In 1925, Electric Power and Light Corporation, an EBASCO subsidiary headquartered in New Orleans, was formed with Couch as its president. It was the parent company for Arkansas Power and Light, Louisiana Power and Light, Mississippi Power and Light and New Orleans Public Service.

As the electric utility industry continued to prosper and expand, Couch began to devote some attention to his earlier interest, locomotives and the railway. A group of investors, led by Couch, gained control of the Louisiana and Arkansas Railway and the Louisiana Navigation & Railway Company for a total of $27 million. Following Interstate Commerce Commission approval, Couch became president of the Kansas City Southern Railway in 1927, and merged all three railways into the K.C.S.-L.&A. System. He created a syndicate of ownership and operators, among those, younger brother Peter Couch, assumed the role of vice-president and general manager. Couch finally had his railway empire that he dreamt of as a child. This organized system, spanning four states, provided direct access from the Midwest to the Gulf Coast. Thousands of jobs were created through railway employment and small businesses that sprouted with the birth of new communities that formed along the railway thoroughfares.

== World War I ==
In addition to his business interests, Harvey Couch contributed through a variety of public service roles, some of which were during times of national crises.

In 1916, President Woodrow Wilson created councils of defense at the state level to aid the Council of National Defense. Couch served under Arkansas Governor Charles H. Brough as Fuel Administrator for the Arkansas Council of Defense. Overcoming the problematic coal shortages that plagued the state, Couch was able to provide coal for Arkansans and create a profit. He contributed all the money, $27,749.06, to the Arkansas Council of Defense, more than half its income.

There were 71,862 Arkansas soldiers that served in the military during World War I. The defense council assisted the United States Employment Service in Arkansas, with the money Couch generated, to help ensure that soldiers from Arkansas would have a job when they returned home. Thousands of cards containing work information were sent to businesses, soldiers, and their relatives to help ensure that the soldiers would find work at a place that best fit both parties. In some cases, soldiers still posted overseas were sent letters confirming they had jobs waiting on them back home.

== The Great Depression ==
The Great Depression led to a greatly expanded government effort to encourage business. One such program was the Reconstruction Finance Corporation (RFC), established under President Herbert Hoover in 1932. Harvey Couch was selected as one of seven directors on the RFC's board. Couch's mission was to finance public works projects and decrease the number of unemployed Americans, which in 1932 was 13 million. Because the government set strict rules in paying back the federal loans, many applicants weren't granted project approval. Three large projects that did receive approval took many years to generate jobs: the San Francisco - Oakland Bay Bridge; the waterworks system of Pasadena, California, and the Colorado River Aqueduct to Los Angeles. Overall, the RFC failed its mission to create much-needed jobs. But, under Couch, small projects received funding and thousands of jobs were created during the winter of 1932–33. One of the United States New Deal programs was the creation of the Public Works Administration in 1933, which was a magnification of Couch's public works sector inside the RFC.

== Broadcasting pioneer ==
Couch founded WOK, the first broadcast radio station in Arkansas. Meant to service the Pine Bluff area, its signal reached large parts of the country.

In 1921, Couch visited Pittsburgh, Pennsylvania, and radio station KDKA, a pioneer of modern broadcasting. On the trip he also met Lee de Forest, inventor of the wireless radiotelephone and the vacuum tube. Couch bought equipment and decided to set up a radio station in his home state, "to advertise Arkansas and, incidentally, AP&L". He saw great potential benefits for his company and Arkansas. AP&L had already been planning to create a radio system so its generating plants around the state would have easy communication. Couch demonstrated the radio in November 1921 to the Pine Bluff Rotary Club.

WOK, "Workers of Kilowatts", went live the night of 18 February 1922. Immediately, AP&L started promoting WOK, and acquired more broadcasting equipment. There were no commercials on the station; it was fully supported by the utility company. In coming months, the station had many firsts in Arkansas: first broadcast sermon, first broadcast sports event, first broadcast music concert, first remote church broadcast.

Couch extolled WOK (and radio in general) for "bringing all parts of the country in close touch". He promoted WOK all over Arkansas, including in many hotels (which were installing radios in lobbies), the Arkansas State Fair and even in prisons. Listeners enjoyed the lack of commercials, but WOK became a financial drain on the utility company and required much employee time. In June 1923, broadcasting ceased, with the expectation it would resume in the fall. The station's license was renewed in September 1923 for another three months, but WOK remained silent. Couch later donated the radio equipment to the former Henderson-Brown College in Arkadelphia.

== Honors and titles ==
Couch was nominated for governmental positions by Presidents Woodrow Wilson, Herbert Hoover, and Franklin D. Roosevelt. He received an Honorary Degree of Doctor of Laws from Baylor University and was a 33rd degree Mason. Couch donated the Harvey C. Couch School (also listed on the National Register) to his native Calhoun in 1928. He has also been awarded honorary degrees from: Hendrix College, Baylor University, Peabody College, Subiaco College, and Future Farmers of America

Arkansas Aviation Historical Society inducted Couch into the Arkansas Aviation Hall of Fame in 1997. The Sam M. Walton College of Business at the University of Arkansas inducted Couch into the Arkansas Business Hall of Fame in 2008.

Magnolia Business Park in Magnolia, Arkansas, was formally renamed "Harvey Couch Business Park" during a ceremony at the entrance to the park on 19 November 2012. Four of Couch's grandchildren attended the ceremony. The entrance road was renamed Harvey Couch Boulevard, and a brick pedestal with a plaque and a likeness of Couch was placed at the park's entrance on U.S. Route 82. The plaque cites his importance as an entrepreneur, industry executive and public servant.

== Final chapter ==
In February 1940, Couch developed a severe case of influenza, but insisted on attending the Democratic National Convention that summer in Chicago even though he had not recovered. After the convention, he traveled to Baltimore, Maryland, and Washington, D.C., where he suffered a heart attack. After several months of recuperation, he returned to Couchwood, his vacation estate near Jones Mills, between Malvern and Hot Springs. The severity of Couch's condition was concealed from the public, and he continued as director of Arkansas' Infantile Paralysis Campaign against polio even as his condition worsened. Harvey Couch died at Couchwood from complications of cardiovascular disease. At 11 a.m. on the day of his funeral at Lakeside Methodist Church in Pine Bluff, all trains on his railroad network halted their route for a minute of silence in his honor. Diesel locomotives and a number of the cars from Couch's beloved K.C.S.-L.&A. system, including the Southern Belle passenger train, which had 120 mph capabilities and air-conditioned compartments, were diverted to Pine Bluff, Arkansas, to serve as a funeral train to carry Couch's body from funeral services in Pine Bluff to Magnolia for burial there in Magnolia Cemetery.

== Couchwood ==
Couchwood is Couch's island estate on Lake Catherine. Presidents Herbert Hoover and Franklin D. Roosevelt both spent time on the island as guests. Couchwood is listed on the National Register of Historic Places, as is Couchwood Historic District, a larger area. There are five red cedar log-houses on the estate: the Big House, Calhoun, Little Pine Bluff, Remmelwood, and the Traincar. Today, the island estate acts as a retreat for descendants and visitors.

Business positions
Preceded by Charles E. Johnston	President of Kansas City Southern Railway; 1939	Succeeded by C. P. "Pete" Couch
