= Job A. Edson =

Job A. Edson (February 14, 1854 – July 30, 1928) was twice the president of Kansas City Southern Railway.

Business positions
Preceded by Stuart R. Knott	President of Kansas City Southern Railway; 1905 – 1918	Succeeded by Leonor F. Loree
Preceded by Leonor F. Loree	President of Kansas City Southern Railway; 1920 – 1928	Succeeded by Charles E. Johnston
