= List of cities served by Kansas City Southern =

Kansas City Southern is the parent company of many railroads and railroad related companies. KCS three main subsidiaries are The Kansas City Southern Railway, Kansas City Southern de México, and The Panama Canal Railway Company. Together, the three railroads serve over 450 cities and towns.

== United States ==
=== Alabama ===
- Birmingham
- Brookwood
- Buhl
- Gordo
- Holt
- Reform
- Tuscaloosa

=== Arkansas ===
- Ashdown
- Decatur
- Fort Smith
- Hope
- Gillham
- Mena
- Nashville
- Patmos
- Siloam Springs
- Vandervoort
- Waldron

=== Illinois ===
- Carrollton
- Cockrell
- East St. Louis
- Godfrey
- Jacksonville
- Jerseyville
- Murrayville
- Pleasant Hill
- Prouty
- Roodhouse
- Springfield
- Wann

=== Kansas ===
- Kansas City
- Pittsburg

=== Louisiana ===
- Alexandria
- Anacoco
- Baton Rouge
- Bayou Pierre
- Benson
- Bienville
- Blanchard
- Bossier
- Calhoun
- Campti
- Cotton Valley
- Coushatta
- Crew Lake
- Delhi
- DeQuincy
- DeRidder
- Gibsland
- Gonzales
- Gramercy
- Hessmer
- Hodge
- Lake Charles
- Latanier
- Leesville
- Lobdell Jct.
- Magenta
- Mansfield
- Minden
- Monrganza
- Monroe
- Montgomery
- New Orleans
- New Roads
- Norco
- Pineville
- Port Hudson
- Reserve
- Ruston
- Shannon
- Shoreline
- Shreveport
- Sibley
- Simmesport
- Simsboro
- Singer
- Spring Hill
- Tallulah
- Winnfield

=== Mississippi ===
- Aberdeen
- Ackerman
- Booneville
- Brandon
- Cedars
- Collins
- Corinth
- Crawford
- Dixon
- Egypt
- Forest
- Glen
- Gulfport
- Hattiesburg
- Hickory
- Jackson
- Lauderdale
- Louisville
- Marion
- McDonald
- Meehan
- Mendenhall
- Meridian
- Morton
- Okolona
- Palmer
- Philadelphia
- Prairie
- Rankin
- Redwood
- Rienzi
- Saltillo
- Sebastopol
- Sharps
- Starkville
- Sturgis
- Sucarnoochee
- Tupelo
- Union
- Vicksburg
- Wahalak
- West Point
- Wiggins
- Yellow Creek

=== Missouri ===
- Amsterdam
- Armstrong
- Asbury
- Bowling Green
- Centralia
- Clark
- Drexel
- Eve
- Fulton
- Glasgow
- Grandview
- Higbee
- Higginsville
- Hume
- Independence
- Jaudon
- Joplin
- Kansas City
- Laddonia
- Marshall
- Mexico
- Neosho
- Noel
- Odessa
- Slater
- Vandalia

=== Oklahoma ===
- Gans
- Heavener
- Howe
- Page
- Poteau
- Sallisaw
- Spiro
- Stilwell
- Westville

=== Tennessee ===
- Counce
- Middleton

=== Texas ===
- Alice
- Bloomburg
- Beaumont
- Cason
- Corpus Christi
- Dallas
- Denton
- Eagle Lake
- Farmersville
- Galveston
- Greenville
- Hebbronville
- Houston
- Hoot
- Hughes Springs
- Hull
- Jury
- Laredo
- Mauriceville
- Metro Jct.
- Oilton
- Placedo
- Port Arthur
- Renner
- Robstown
- Ruliff
- San Diego
- Sinton
- Sulphur Springs
- Texarkana
- Wylie
- Zacha

== Mexico ==
=== Aguascalientes ===
- Aguascalientes
- San Gil
- Gallardo
- Jaltomate
- Amapola del Río
- San José del Río
- Chicalote
- El Tule

=== Coahuila ===
- Agua Nueva
- Benjamin Mendez
- Encantada
- Gómez Farias
- Guillermo
- La Ventura
- Ledezma
- Ramos Arizpe
- Saltillo

=== D.F. ===
- El Naranjo
- Julia
- Los Morales
- México City
- San Pedro
- Santa Fe
- Tacuba

=== Guanajuato ===
- Acámbaro
- Alverez
- Arena Blanca
- Arroyo de la Luna
- Buchanan López
- Chamcacuaro
- Comonfort
- Crucero a Cel
- Dolores Hidalgo
- Escobedo
- Montelongo
- Ojo Seco
- Piedra De Lumbre
- Salvatierra
- San José Iturbide
- San Miguel de Allende

=== Hidalgo ===
- Aragón
- Ciudad Cahagun
- General Zarag
- Huichapan
- Pachuca
- Tula

=== Jalisco ===
- Atequiza
- Camcel
- Constancia
- Corona
- El Castillo
- El Grande
- El Pedregal
- Feliciano
- Guadalajara
- La Barca
- La Capilla
- La Junta
- Ladrillera
- Limón
- Ocotlan
- Poncitlan
- Salamea
- San Jacinto
- Santa Inesita

=== México State ===
- Aguatepec
- Alberto Gardunoc
- Atlacomulco
- Azteca
- Bassoco
- Campero
- Carretera
- Celaya
- Chico
- Chipiltepec
- Chuautlalpan
- Corralejo
- Cortazar
- Cortes
- Del Río
- Dona Rosa
- Dos Ríos
- El Oro
- Huehuetoca
- Irapuato
- Ixtlahuaca de Rayón
- Joaquín
- La Maraña
- La Piedad
- Manto
- Metepec
- Oliva
- Paula
- Penjamo
- Polotitlan
- Robles
- Salamanca
- Salazar
- San Andrés
- San Martín
- San Vicente
- Santa Clara
- Silao
- Tepeolilco
- Texcoco
- Tlalnepantla
- Toluca
- Tultenango
- Vieyra
- Villagrán
- Xometla

=== Michoacán ===
- Agua Buena
- Ajuno
- Caltzontzin
- Caracha
- Chupanguio
- Coro
- El Jabalí
- El Plan
- El Salvador
- Fontezuela
- Huarenitizo
- Huingo
- Infiernillo
- Irimbo
- Jácaro
- La Angangueo
- La Junta
- La Vinata
- Las Canas
- Lázaro Cárdenas
- Limoncito
- Los Chivos
- Maravatio
- Morelia
- Ocampo
- Parácuaro
- Pátzcuaro
- Tarascon
- Zitácuaro

=== Nuevo León ===
- Anáhuac
- Arista
- Barretosa
- Doctor Coss
- Jarita
- La Mariposa
- Lampazos de Naranjo
- Leona
- Monterrey
- Ramon
- Ramones
- Salinas Victoria
- San Nicolás de los Garza
- Soledad
- Topo
- Villaldama

=== Puebla ===
- Artesiano
- Oriental
- Pizarro
- Tepeyahualco
- Titipanapa
- Varela

=== Querétaro ===
- Ahorcado
- Cazadero
- Chintepec
- Hércules
- La Griega
- Palmillas
- Peón
- Querétaro
- San Juan del Río
- Viborillas

=== San Luis Potosí ===
- Cardenas
- Celis
- Cerritos
- Cerritos
- Las tablas
- Moctezuma
- Rio Verde
- Salinas de Hidalgo
- San Ignacio
- San Luis Potosí
- San Viccente
- Tambaca
- Tolosa
- Valles
- Vanegas
- Venado
- Vharcas
- Wadley

=== Tamaulipas ===
- Altimira
- Camargo
- Canales
- Miramar
- Nuevo Laredo
- Ochoa
- Ramirez
- Reynosa
- Rio Bravo
- Sanchez
- Sandoval
- Tampico
- Valadeces

=== Tlaxcala ===
- Calderón
- Ceron
- Dolores
- Iturbe
- La Luz
- La Trasquila
- Munoz
- Pavón
- Santo Domingo
- Tecoac
- Tlaloc
- Vega
- Veloz
- Xicohtncatl

=== Veracruz ===
- Alborada
- Banderilla
- Carbono
- Cardel
- Chavarrillo
- Chila
- Dehesa
- Extremo Vía
- Ferronales
- Jalapa
- La Posta
- Mendez
- Ochoa
- Pacho
- Palmar
- Rubin
- San Miguel
- Tamarindo
- Tamos
- Tigrillos
- Veracruz

=== Zacatecas ===
- Bimbaletes
- Genaro
- La Honda
- La Olma
- Loreto
- Tauro

== Panama ==
=== Colón ===
- Colón

=== Panamá ===
- Panama
