= William N. Deramus IV =

William N. Deramus IV (born April 15, 1944) was the fourteenth president of Kansas City Southern Railway.

Business positions
Preceded by Thomas S. Carter	President of Kansas City Southern Railway; 1986 – 1990	Succeeded by Landon H. Rowland
