= William N. Deramus III =

American businessman (1915–1989)

William Neal Deramus III
- Born: December 10, 1915; Pittsburg, Kansas
- Died: November 15, 1989 (aged 73); Kansas City, Missouri
- Education: University of Michigan

William Neal Deramus III (December 10, 1915 – November 15, 1989) was an American railroad executive; he led the Chicago Great Western Railway (CGW), the Missouri-Kansas-Texas Railroad, and the Kansas City Southern Railway (KCS) through periods of great change in the railroad industry.

Deramus graduated from the University of Michigan in 1936 and received his law degree from Harvard University in 1939, and upon graduation entered the railroading industry with the Wabash Railway as a minor executive. During World War II he used his railroading background and skills to help run the Ledo Road, and upon his return, found work as an executive with the Kansas City Southern, which at the time was run by his father, William N. Deramus Jr.

He was the youngest person ever to be elected to the presidency of a Class I railroad in 1949 when he took the helm of the Chicago Great Western. In that year he also served on the board of directors for the second and final year of the Chicago Railroad Fair. His tenure at the CGW was marked by increased modernization of the physical plant of the railroad and cost cutting. He left the CGW for a three-year stint as president of the Missouri-Kansas-Texas in 1957, where he also reduced operating and maintenance costs. He simplified the locomotive paint schemes and introduced a less expensive paint referred to as Deramus red. He then took over for his father as president of the KCS.

== Notes ==
Business positions
Preceded by Grant Stauffer	President of Chicago Great Western Railway; 1949 – 1957	Succeeded by Edward T. Reidy
Preceded by Donald V. Fraser	President of Missouri-Kansas-Texas Railroad; 1957 – 1961	Succeeded by Charles T. Williams
Preceded by William N. Deramus Jr.	President of Kansas City Southern Railway; 1961 – 1973	Succeeded by Thomas S. Carter
