= Calhoun, Arkansas =

- Unincorporated community
- Location within Arkansas Location within the United States
- Coordinates: 33°13′10″N 93°09′17″W
- Country: United States
- State: Arkansas
- County: Columbia
- Elevation: 354 ft (108 m)
- Time zone: UTC-6 (Central (CST))
  - Summer (DST): UTC-5 (CDT)
- Area code: 870
- GNIS feature ID: 57492

Calhoun is an unincorporated community in Columbia County, Arkansas, United States. Calhoun is located 5.9 miles (9.5 km) southeast of Magnolia.
