= William N. Deramus Jr. =

American businessman (1888–1965)

- Born: March 25, 1888; Coopers, Alabama, U.S.
- Died: December 2, 1965 (aged 77); Kansas City, Missouri, U.S.
- Occupation: Railroad executive

William Neal Deramus Jr. (March 25, 1888 – December 2, 1965) was an American railroad executive. He served as the longest running president for the Kansas City Southern Railway from 1941 to 1961. Deramus led the company through the Great Depression by encouraging industry to locate on the Gulf Coast in Louisiana and Texas. He helped the railway avoid bankruptcy in the 1930s and refinanced $67 million in bonded debt that fell due in the late 1940s.

== Early life ==
Deramus was born in Coopers, Alabama, the son of William N. Deramus and Josephine Flynn Deramus. His formal education ended after 8th grade. Before he was 14, he agreed to tend the switch lamps eagerly and keep the station in order for $4 a month, and an opportunity to learn Morse code. Within a year, Deramus was promoted to relief operator, and rapidly advanced within the company. From the L&N, he went to the Atlantic Coast Line Railroad (ACL), then to the Southern Railway (SOU), where, at 20, he became a dispatcher in Memphis, Tennessee.

== Career ==
His chief in Memphis resigned to accept a job with the Kansas City Southern Railway in Pittsburg, Kansas. Before leaving, the chief gave Deramus a recommendation at the Kansas City Southern Railway, leaving opportunity for him to succeed. He worked diligently, and in 1945 he was elected as the president and chairman of the board.

He spent almost half his time out on the railway. It is said that he knew the 1,647 miles of track between Kansas City and the Gulf of Mexico so well that he could tell where he was by the sound of the wheels on the rails. Under the impetus he provided the Kansas City Southern, its net income was twice the industry average.

Deramus was a major figure in Kansas City's civic life. In 1957, the Deramus' family donated the Deramus Field Station to MRIGlobal to support the organization's growing contract research business.

== Personal life ==
Deramus married Lucille Ione; he died in 1965, at the age of 77, in Kansas City. His son William N. Deramus III worked in the railroad industry.

Business positions
Preceded by C. P. Couch	President of Kansas City Southern Railway; 1941 – 1961	Succeeded by William N. Deramus III
