= Louisiana and Arkansas Railway =

Railroad connecting Louisiana, Texas and Arkansas

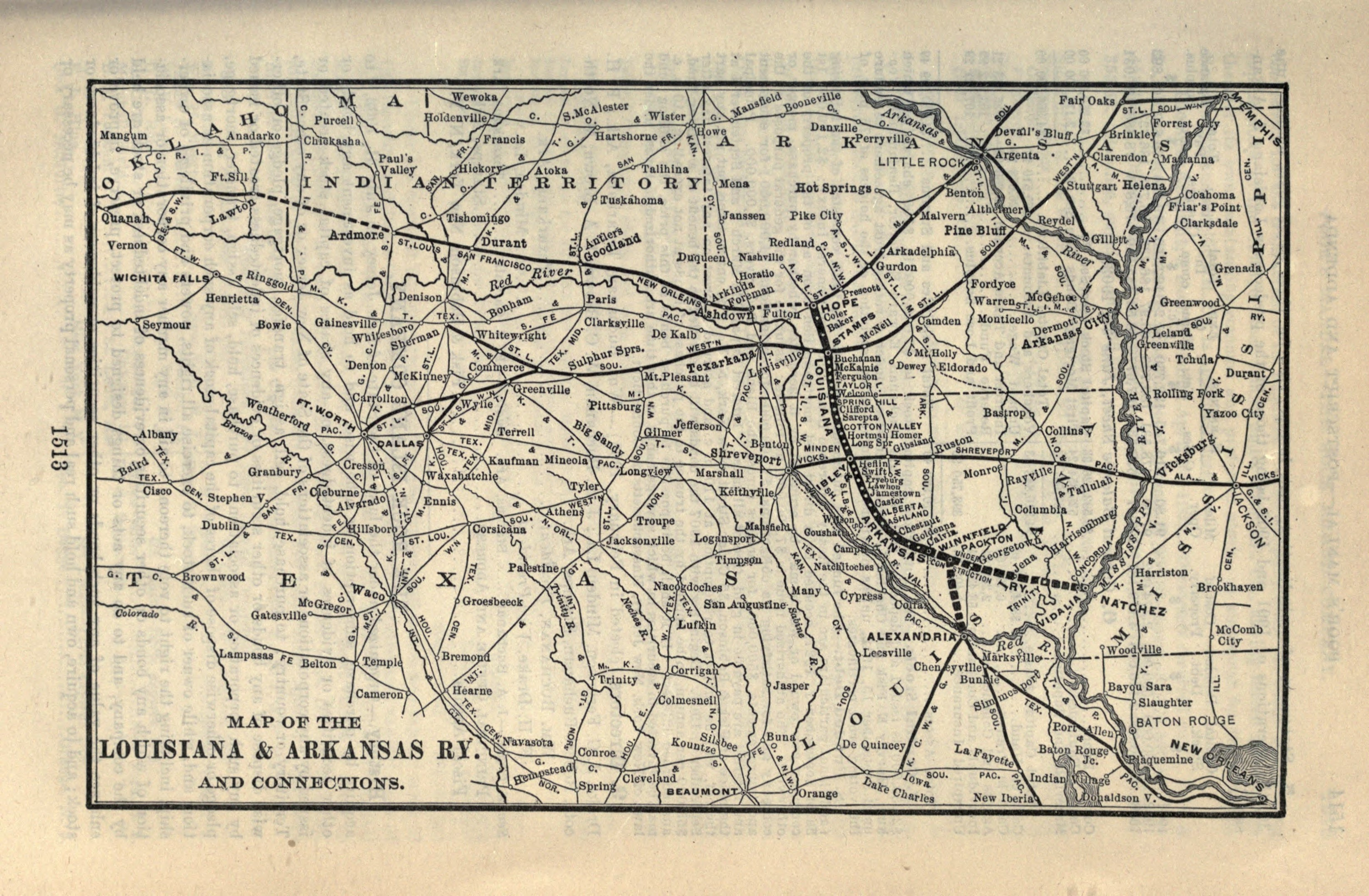
- 1903 system map of the L&A

Overview
- Headquarters: Shreveport, Louisiana
- Reporting mark: LA
- Locale: Arkansas, Louisiana, Texas
- Dates of operation: 1898–1992
- Successor: Kansas City Southern

Technical
- Track gauge: 4 ft 8 1/2 in (1,435 mm) standard gauge

The Louisiana and Arkansas Railway (reporting mark LA) was a railroad that operated in the states of Arkansas, Louisiana, and Texas. The railroad's main line extended 332 miles, from Hope, Arkansas to Shreveport and New Orleans. Branch lines served Vidalia, Louisiana (opposite Natchez, Mississippi), and Dallas, Texas.

== History ==
The Louisiana and Arkansas Railroad was incorporated in Arkansas in 1898 for the purpose of acquiring former logging railroad properties in Arkansas and Louisiana. The railroad was constructed and initially operated under the leadership of William Buchanan, a prosperous timberman with extensive investments in southwest Arkansas and northwest Louisiana. Buchanan's partners were Harvey C. Couch and William C. Edenborn. Buchanan's primary company, Bodcaw Lumber Company, was headquartered in Stamps, Arkansas, and that city also served as headquarters of the L&A until the late 1920s. It was reorganized in 1902 as the Louisiana and Arkansas Railway.

== 1910 ==
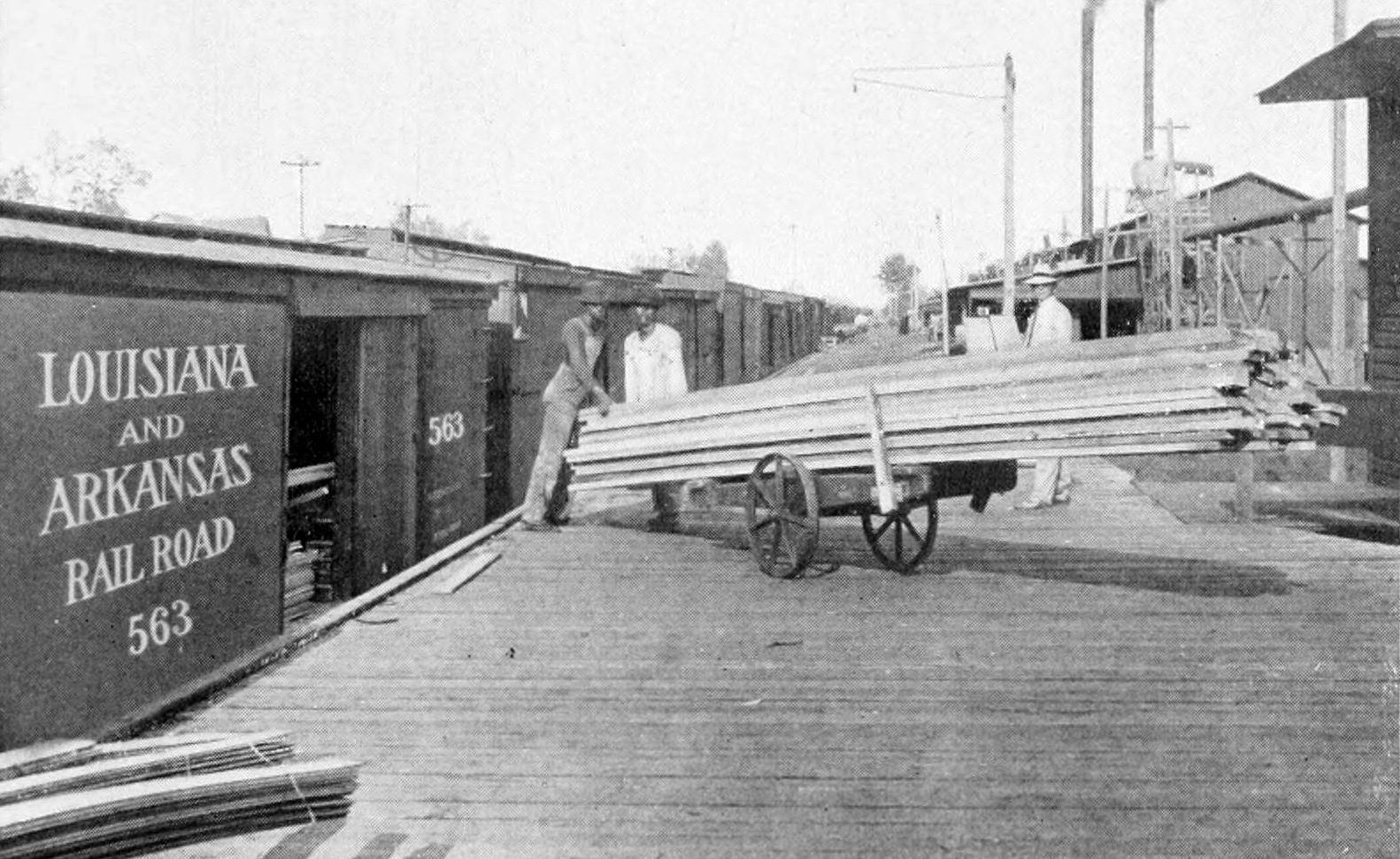
Loading lumber in Stamps, Arkansas, 1904

In 1910, the L&A Railway and Arkansas Southern Railroad were involved in a dispute over Louisiana taxes, a notable court case which ultimately was heard by the U.S. Supreme Court.

== 1920s ==
During the late 1920s, a group of investors led by Harvey Couch began acquiring Louisiana & Arkansas stock. These investors owned electric and telephone utilities in Arkansas and Louisiana and believed that railroad ownership in their service area would also be profitable. When control of the L&A was thus secured on January 16, 1928, a new company was chartered in Delaware in 1928 to acquire the former Louisiana and Arkansas Railway Company. It also leased and later acquired the Louisiana Railway and Navigation Company, which operated a marginally profitable railroad between New Orleans and Shreveport. The L&A inaugurated a new premier passenger train, The Shreveporter, on December 30, 1928, operating between Shreveport and Hope, Arkansas. This train carried a through Pullman sleeping car between Shreveport and St. Louis, Missouri, in conjunction with Missouri Pacific Railroad. A second named passenger train, The Hustler, was added to provide overnight service between Shreveport and New Orleans, beginning on July 2, 1932.

== 1930s ==
The Harvey Couch interests began purchasing stock of the Kansas City Southern Railway (KCS) in 1937. After gaining control of the KCS in 1939, a decision was made to merge the two properties. Kansas City Southern was the surviving corporation, with the Louisiana & Arkansas as a KCS subsidiary, but the KCS president and the controlling stockholders were all from the L&A. This merger created "single line" railroad freight service between Kansas City and New Orleans, and on September 2, 1940, a new KCS-L&A diesel powered streamliner, the Southern Belle, was inaugurated to connect the two cities.

== 1940s ==
In 1948, in a letter to Ernest W. Roberts, Harry Truman described the difficult working conditions for certain black workers employed by this railroad.

== 1950s ==
The worst wreck in the history of the L&A occurred on August 10, 1951, when a northbound L&A troop train collided head-on with the southbound Southern Belle just north of Lettsworth, Louisiana; Lettsworth is located approximately 55 miles northwest of Baton Rouge, on a segment of the Texas and Pacific Railway over which L&A trains had operating rights. The troop train was traveling 40 mph (64 km/h) and the Southern Belle was moving at the maximum speed limit of 55 mph (89 km/h) when the collision occurred on a long curve where vegetation obscured visibility. Thirteen people were killed, and another eighty-two were injured. It was determined that the accident had occurred because the troop train had overlooked a train order to wait in a siding at Lettsworth to allow the passenger train to pass.

== 1950- 1960 ==
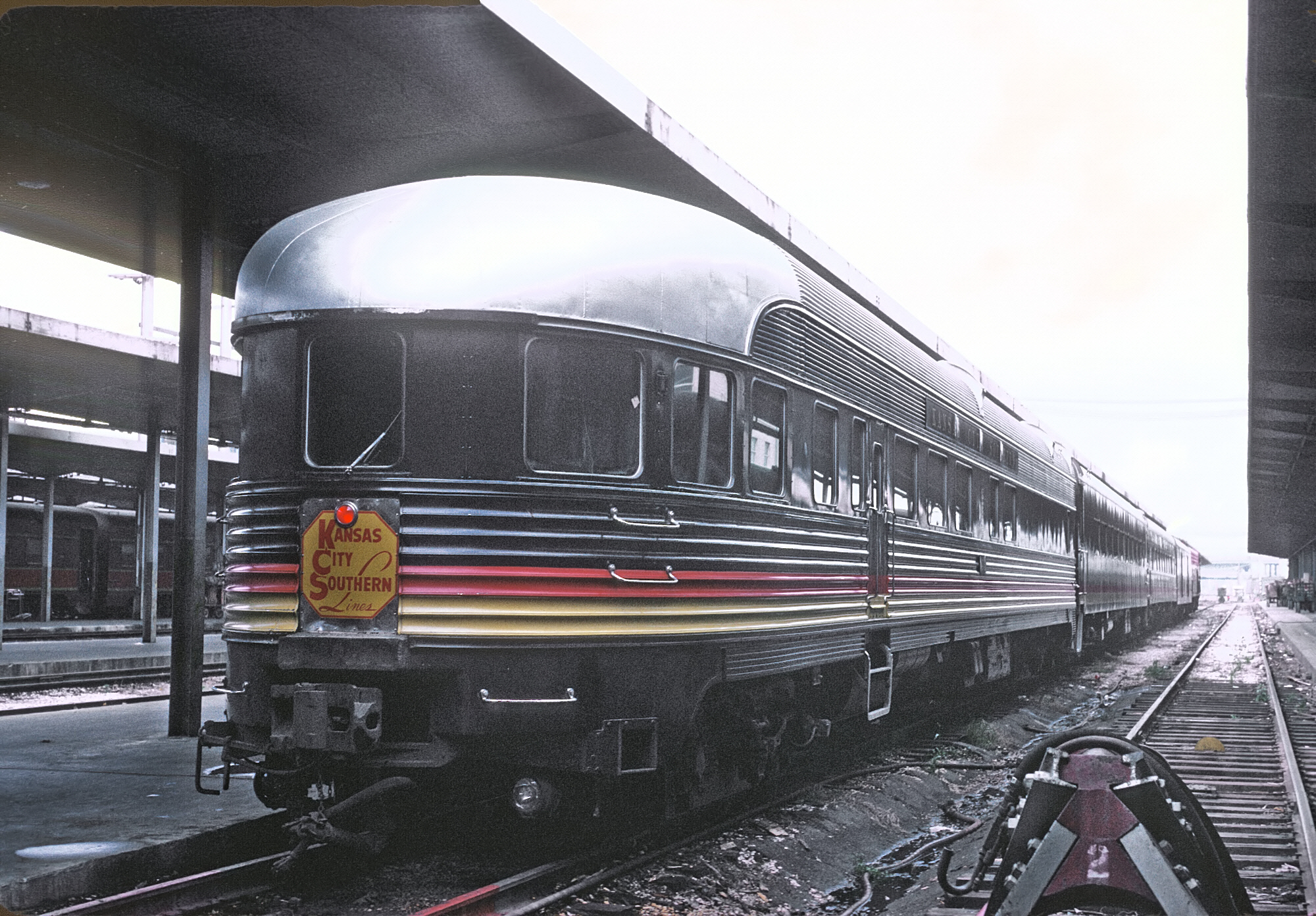
Louisiana and Arkansas Railway's Train 10, The Flying Crow, at New Orleans Union Terminal on November 22, 1967.

The identity of the Louisiana & Arkansas gradually disappeared in the 1950s and 1960s, as the Kansas City Southern name was adopted for all properties. By 1966, all reference to the Louisiana & Arkansas had disappeared from the annual stockholder reports of Kansas City Southern. The Shreveporter, once the pride of the L&A, was discontinued on January 24, 1962, and the Southern Belle was discontinued on November 2, 1969, ending all passenger train service on the former Louisiana & Arkansas.

== 1990-present ==
In 1992, Kansas City Southern dissolved the subsidiary Louisiana & Arkansas Railway, although the former L&A route continues to be a major component of the Canadian Pacific Kansas City.

== Preserved engines ==
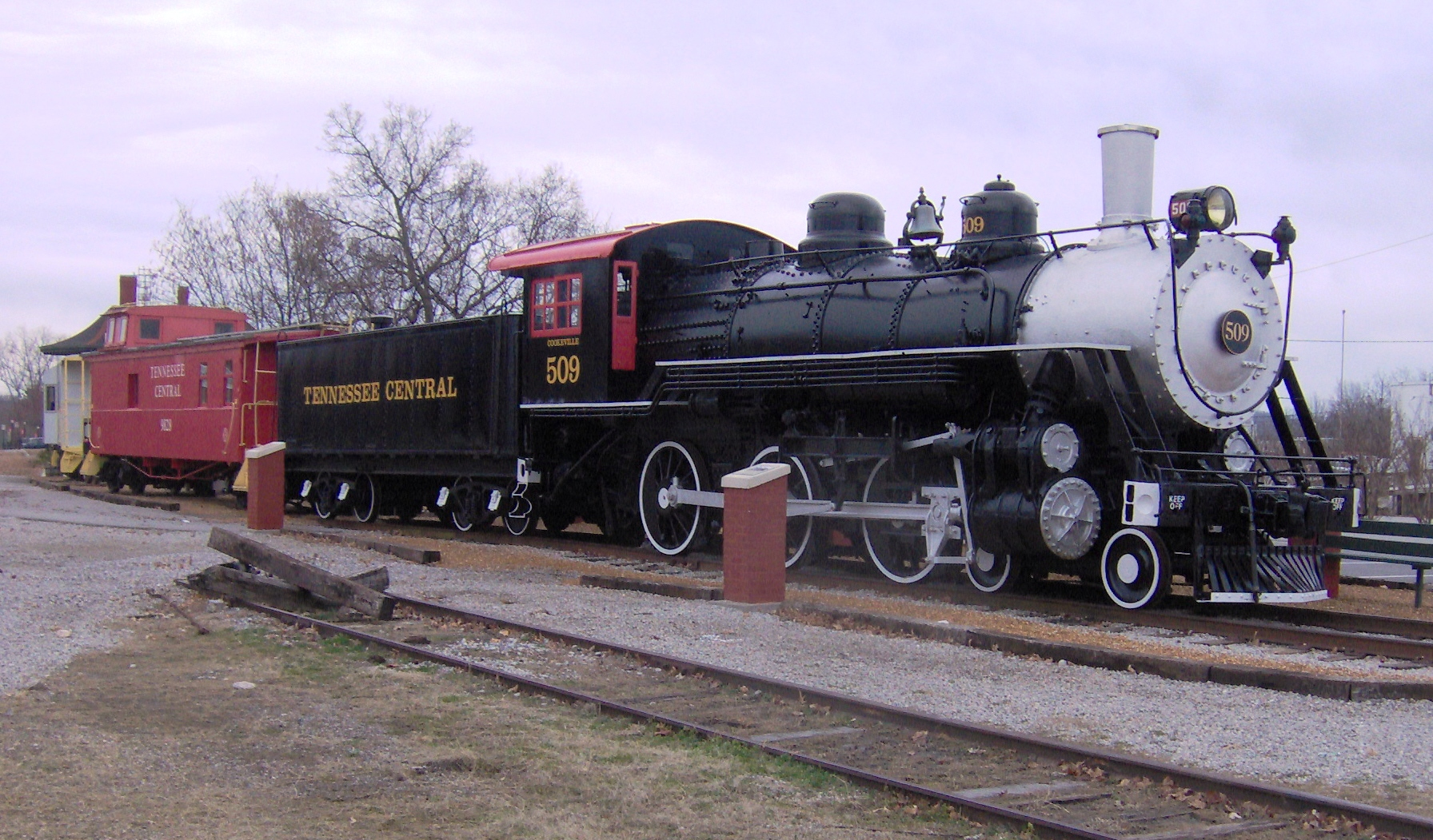
L&A 4-6-0 #509 (lettered as Tennessee Central 509) on display at the Cookeville Depot in Cookeville, Tennessee.

There are three steam engines preserved that once worked for the Louisiana & Arkansas, and all of which are on static display.

L&A no. 99, a 2-8-0 consolidation built by Baldwin in 1919, is on display at the Illinois Railway Museum in Union, Illinois.

L&A no. 503, a 4-6-0 ten-wheeler built by Baldwin in 1920, is on display at Bryan Park in Port Arthur, Texas. No. 503 is currently lettered as Kansas City Southern 503 despite never working for KCS.

L&A no. 509 (originally no. 403), another ten-wheeler built by Baldwin in 1913, is the oldest of the three in preservation. No. 509 is on display at the Cookeville Depot in Cookeville, Tennessee, and is altered and lettered to resemble the ten-wheelers used by the Tennessee Central Railway.

== Bibliography ==
- Fair, James R. (1997). The Louisiana & Arkansas Railway. Northern Illinois University Press. ISBN 0-87580-219-2.
- Mayor, Archer H. (1988). Southern Timberman, The Legacy of William Buchanan. University of Georgia Press. ISBN 0-8203-0999-0.
- Wilson, Stephen (1986). Harvey Couch, An Entrepreneur Brings Electricity to Arkansas. August House. ISBN 0-87483-025-7.
- Wilson, Winston P. (1947). Harvey Couch, The Master Builder.
